= Lois D. Martin =

American activist (1928–2022)

Lois Dolphus Martin (September 23, 1928 – January 9, 2022) was an American educator, public servant, and a community activist in the Pearl City neighborhood of Boca Raton, FL. Martin served as the Secretary to the Parks and Recreation Advisory Board, Vice Chairman for the Housing Authority, Habitat for Humanity contributor, Sunday school teacher and Treasurer for the Ebenezer Baptist Church. Martin is considered to be an exceptional figure in the history of Boca Raton due to her influence in the community and fidelity to education, activism and social justice.

== Early life and education ==
Martin was born in Boca Raton, FL, on September 23, 1928, to Sallie, a laundress and restaurant worker, and Jasper Dolphus, a sharecropper. Martin’s family relocated from Georgia prior to her birth. She was the youngest of eight children, and the only one of her seven siblings to graduate high school. During her lifetime, Martin stated that her experiences as a child helping her mother wash and iron laundry fueled her desire to pursue an education.

As a child, she attended grade school at Pearl City Elementary School and Roadman Elementary School. In 1946, Martin graduated from Carver High School in Delray Beach, Florida as the class salutatorian. She subsequently earned her A.A. degree from Florida Normal College in 1948. Dissatisfied with the academic environment of Florida Normal College and seeking more personal independence, Martin transferred to Florida A&M University where she worked to finance her own education. She graduated from Florida A&M University in 1950, earning a B.S. in Mathematics. Martin was one of four women to graduate that year as a mathematics major. After her undergraduate studies were complete, Martin pursued graduate studies in Physics at Boston College.

== Career as educator ==
After returning to Boca Raton in 1950, Martin taught mathematics for nearly 40 years at local schools including Carver High School, Booker T. Washington High School (Montgomery, Alabama) and Carver Middle School. Her early career as an educator was marked by resistance to implementing tangible changes in schools after the Supreme Court’s decision in Brown Vs. Board of Education, in addition to a pronounced disparity between black and white schools and a lack of equal pay for black teachers.

In 1965, Martin left her position at Carver High School in Delray Beach, to begin teaching in Montgomery, Alabama at Booker T. Washington High School, an integrated environment. She returned to an integrated Carver High School in 1970 to encounter a rigid racial and economic hierarchy.

== Civic leadership ==
Martin is recognized for her illustrious career in local government and in local community organizations. Between the years of 1971 and 1973, she was Secretary of Boca Raton Parks and Recreation Advisory board. As Vice-Chairman of Boca Raton Housing Authority from 1978 to 1986, Martin lead the development of Dixie Manor, an affordable housing community which provided housing for close to one hundred families. From 1991 to 2009, Martin was the Habitat for Humanity Pearl City Leader. Between the years of 2001 and 2006, Martin severed on the Boca Raton Preservation Board. Other notable positions in the community include Vice Chairman of the Pearl City Blue Ribbon Committee, which was awarded $4.6 million for infrastructure improvements and social-service programs for Pearl City in 2001, and Treasurer of the Martin Luther King Jr. Memorial Foundation which raised $165,000 for the construction of the Martin Luther King Jr. Memorial on Glades Road and Federal Highway in Boca Raton.

== Legacy and honors ==
In 2001, Martin became the first African American to be inducted to the Boca Raton Walk of Recognition.

=== Lois D. Martin Way ===
Upon the passing of Martin on January 9, 2022, community activist organization D.I.S.C of Pearl City pursued efforts to have Glades Road between Dixie and Federal Highway named Lois D. Martin Way in honor of Martin. The portion of Glades Road named in honor of Lois Martin sits adjacent to the historic Pearl City neighborhood of Boca Raton where African Americans were able to purchase land and settle the area in the early 20th century. Furthermore, the area just north of Pearl City, Lincoln Court, and also the housing development of Dixie Manor are part of the greater Pearl City geographic area. The extension of Glades Road by the Florida Department of Transportation in 1978 effectively split the historic African American community in Boca Raton down the center.

On December 13, 2022, the Boca Raton City Council unanimously passed a resolution in support of the naming of a segment of Glades Road located between Dixie Highway and Federal Highway, in the Pearl City neighborhood, as "Lois D. Martin Way". Shortly after, Florida State Senator Tina Polsky offered an amendment to the Florida House of Representatives H.B. 21 providing the honorary designation. On May 1, 2023 the Florida House passed H.B. 21, thus guaranteeing the honorary designation of the segment of Glades Road in the Pearl City neighborhood in honor of Martin.

=== The Tree of Knowledge ===
An early and noteworthy accomplishment of Martin was her leadership in preserving the Tree of Knowledge in Pearl City. In 1978, the Florida Department of Transportation (FDOT) had planned to remove the Tree of Knowledge in the planned extension of Glades Road. The Tree of Knowledge was originally planted by the students of the first black school in Boca Raton, Roadman School, in the 1920's, and received its name from World War II Negro soldiers who met under the tree to share their experiences and knowledge. Many generations of Pearl City residents have used the Tree of Knowledge as a location for social gatherings and entertainment. The Tree maintains a large degree of significance within the community.

=== Dixie Manor ===
In 1985, the City of Boca Raton established the Boca Raton Housing Authority where Martin served as the Vice Chairman. In order for the city to access federal grants for housing, the federal government required municipalities to have an affordable housing plan and an autonomous governing body to execute the plan. After six years of work, the Boca Raton Housing Authority acquired federal and city funding, completed the pre-construction planning and design and broke ground on Monday, November 2, 1981. The original Dixie Manor was built in 1942 as WWII Black Army barracks and transitioned to black public housing after the war. The new redeveloped Dixie Manor affordable housing complex currently serves over 95 families with an additional 45 new apartments, a community center, and a playground. Martin missed one meeting in the six years of her tenure. It was during one missed meeting, the Housing Authority Board voted to rename the new Dixie Manor Community Center building the "Lois Martin Community Center".
