= Mizner Park =

Coordinates: 26.354651°N 80.085233°W

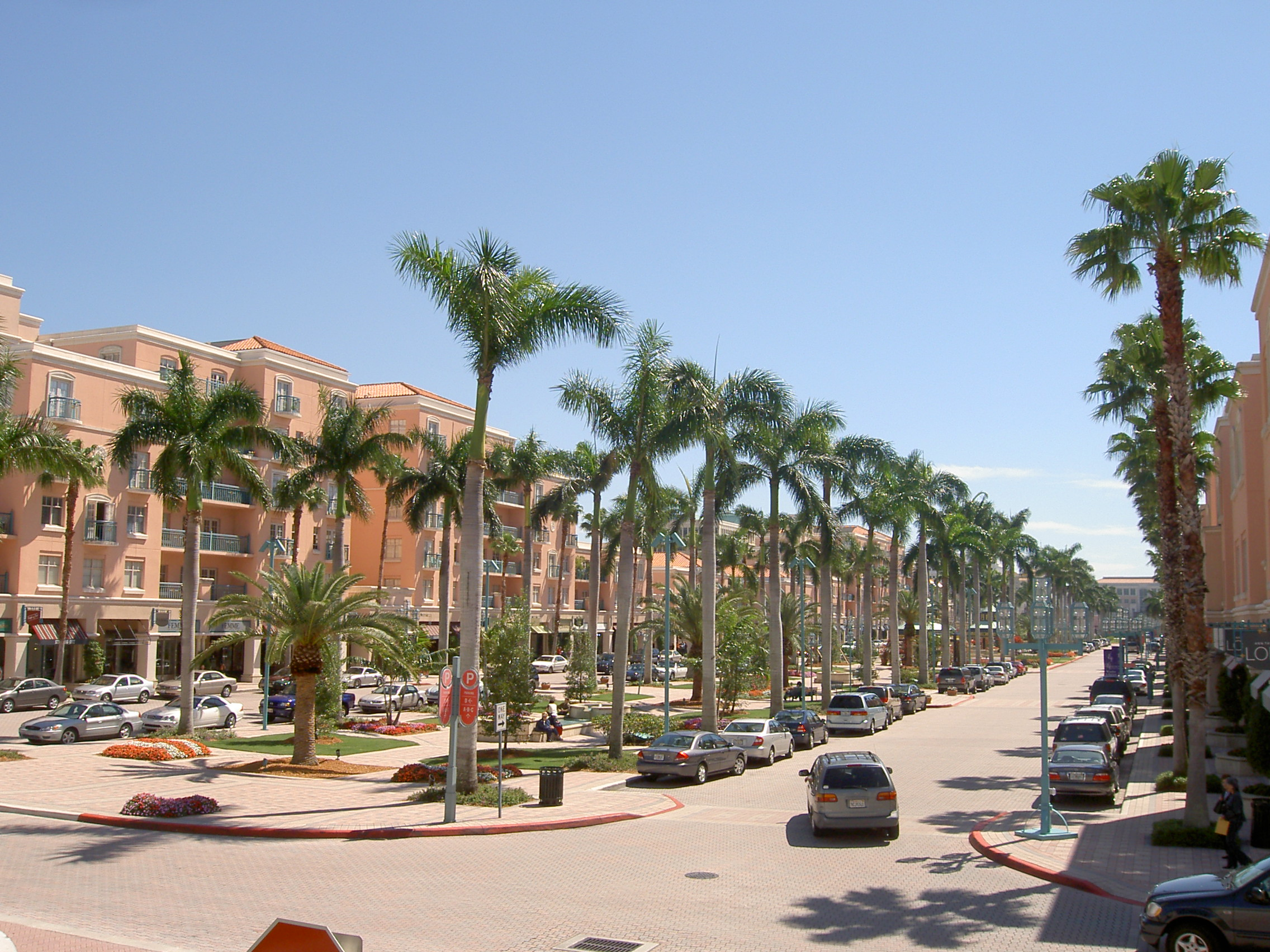
- View of Plaza Real, c. 2005
- Address: 327 Plaza Real; Boca Raton, Florida 33432-3944
- Opened: 1974 (Boca Mall); January 11, 1991; 35 years ago (Mizner Park)
- Previous names: Boca Mall
- Developer: Crocker Partners
- Manager: GGP
- Owner: GGP
- Architect: Cooper Carry & Associates, Inc.
- Num. of stores: 44
- Num. of anchor tenants: 2 (1 open, 1 vacant)
- Floor area: 398,000 sq ft (37,000 m^{2})
- Floors: 1
- Website: Official Website

Mizner Park is a high-end shopping, residential, and entertainment district located in the affluent downtown neighborhood of Boca Raton, Florida. The district consists of a collection of high-end shops and restaurants with luxury apartments built in a Mediterranean Revival architectural style. The mall opened in 1991 on the site of the former Boca Mall, which opened in 1974.

The Centre for the Arts at Mizner Park is located on the north end of the development, which includes an amphitheatre and the Boca Raton Museum of Art.

Cooper Carry designed Mizner as a classical Mediterranean Revival town center. It is named for architect Addison Mizner, founder of Boca Raton.

== History ==
The site of Mizner Park was previously a conventional enclosed shopping center called Boca Mall, which opened in 1974. Boca Mall was originally anchored by Britt's and Jefferson Ward. The former closed in 1982 and was temporarily occupied by IBM offices until 1985, when it was converted to Levitz Furniture. In 1989, Levitz relocated and Jefferson Ward closed. The colloquial term "dive bar" may have entered widespread use as a result of a bar located in the mall in its final days. The closure of these anchors led to the mall's demolition and redevelopment.

Mizner Park opened in 1991, expanding in 1996 with a Jacobson's department store. Jacobson's closed in July 2002 after the chain declared bankruptcy, and its location became Robb & Stucky Interiors in 2003. After Robb & Stucky also declared bankruptcy, its store was closed as well. The building was converted to Lord & Taylor in 2013.

It was home to the National Cartoon Museum from 1992 to 2002.

In 2017, Ouzo Bay opened at Mizner Park. It closed in 2019.

== Amphitheater ==
Mizner Park Amphitheater
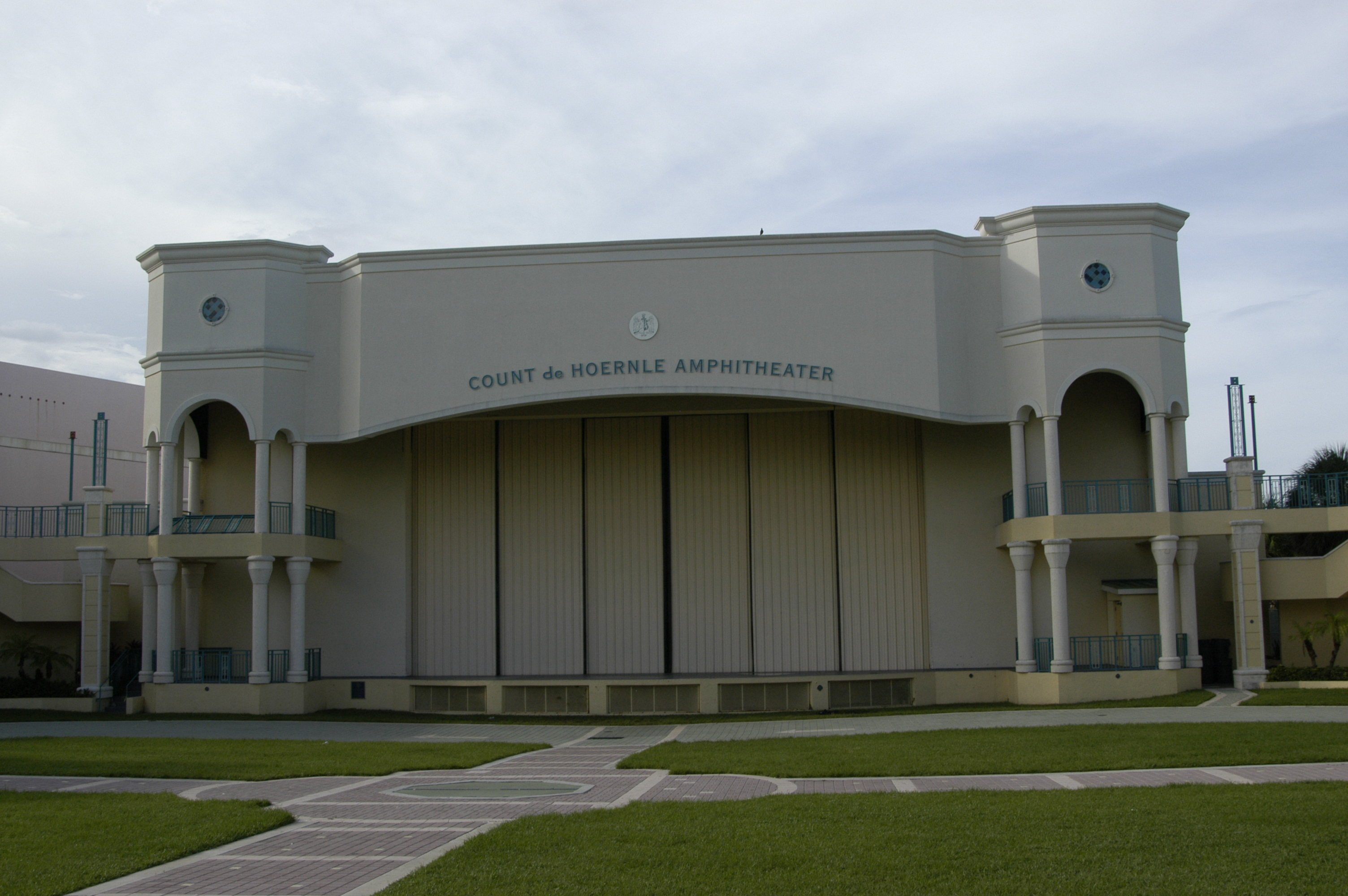
- Interactive map of Mizner Park Amphitheater
- Former names: Count de Hoernle Amphitheater (2002-10)
- Address: 590 Plaza Real; Boca Raton, FL 33432-3983
- Location: Pearl City
- Owner: City of Boca Raton
- Capacity: 3,520

Construction
- Opened: November 21, 2002
- Renovated: 2011
- Cost: $6.2 million ($11.1 million in 2025 dollars)
- Architect: Robert G. Currie Partnership
- General contractor: Kaufman Lynn Construction

The Mizner Park Amphitheater (originally known as the Count de Hoernle Amphitheater) is an outdoor amphitheater located in Boca Raton, Florida. It can be found in the northeast corner of Mizner Park, an outdoor shopping center in Pearl City. It was named after the Count and Countess de Hoernle.

The mid-sized venue cost $6.2 million to construct. It consists of a stage surrounded by a colonnade with a statue and fountain at the entrance of the lawn area. The venue seats 3,520, which can be expanded to 4,200 in a general admission setting.

The venue opened in November 2002 with an inauguration ceremony by Henrietta Rach de Hoernle, followed a concert by Florida Symphony Orchestra. The city took ownership of the amphitheatre in September 2010, changing the venue's name as well.

It is the summer home to the Boca Raton Symphonia.

== Gallery ==
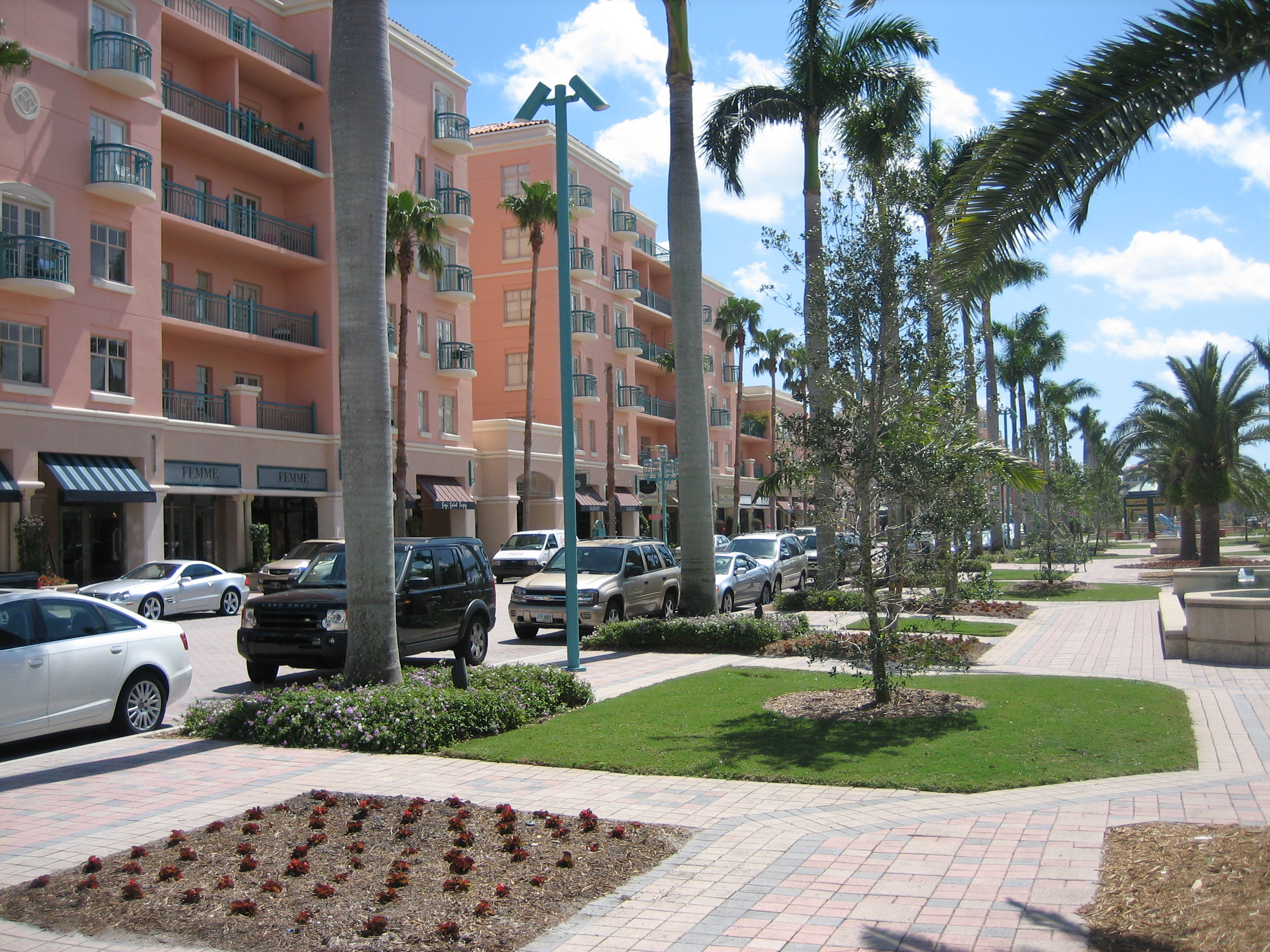
The street median functions as a promenade

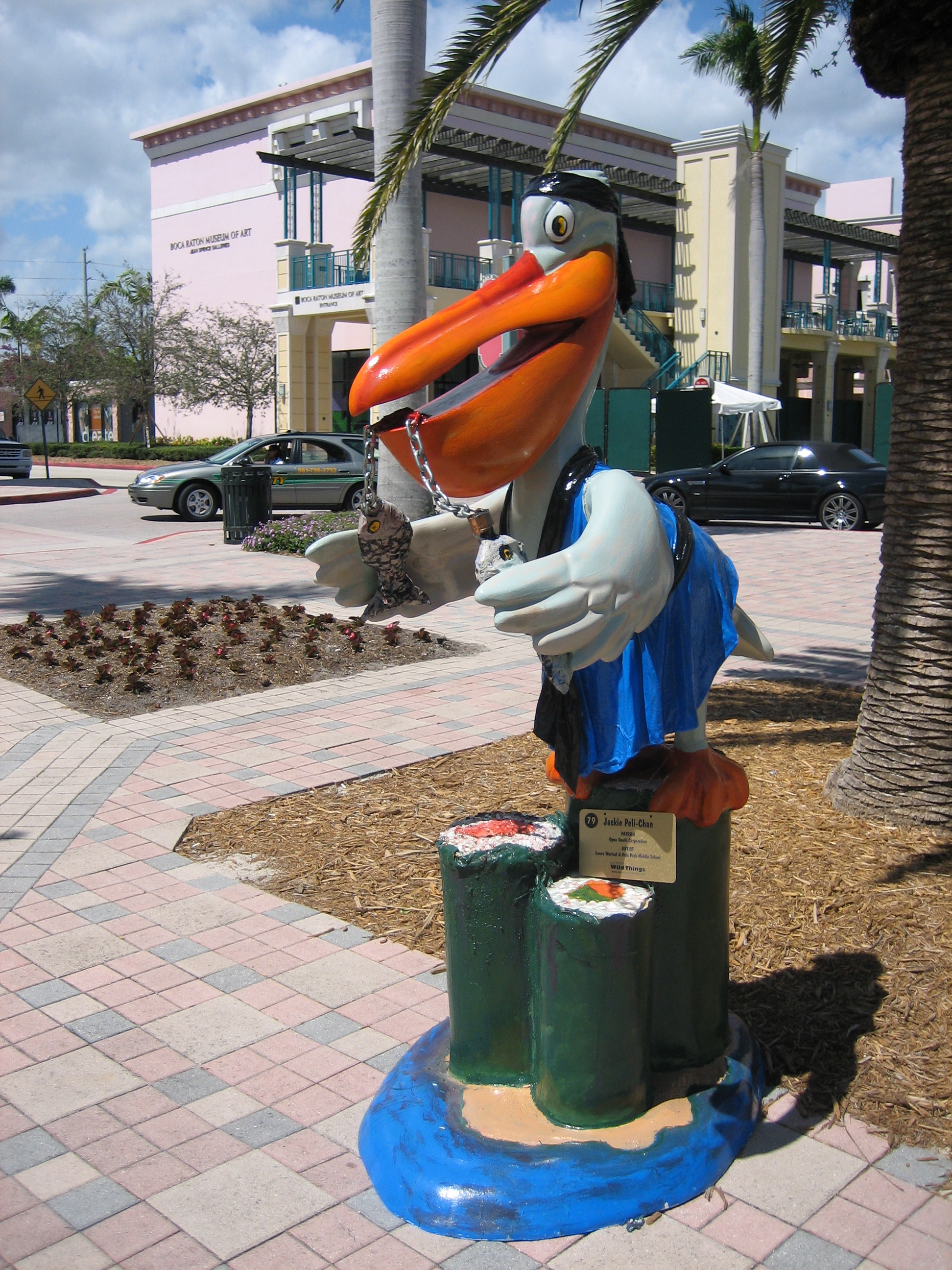
Sculpture of an anthropomorphic pelican
