= Yachtico =

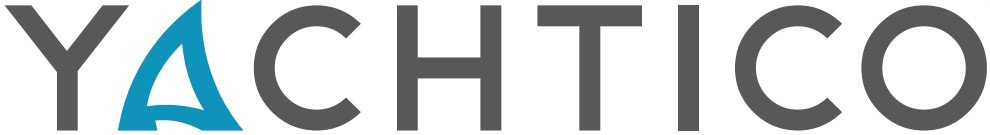
- Type: Private
- Industry: Travel Yachting
- Founded: 2010; 16 years ago
- Founders: Steffen Bruenn
- Headquarters: Boca Raton, Florida, United States
- Key people: Steffen Brunn (CEO); Dale Okuno; Henrik Vanderlip; Joseph Vittoria
- Services: Yacht Charter; Bareboat charter Crewed Charter
- Divisions: Berlin; Boca Raton
- Website: www.yachtico.com

Yachtico is an international yacht charter rental company that offers rentals of professional crewed and bare boat yacht. Headquartered in Boca Raton, Florida with operations in Europe in Berlin.

== History ==
Yachtico was founded by Steffen Bruenn in 2010 and launched the yacht vacation booking platform in May 2011 in Germany, Austria and Switzerland with a European focus.

Yachtico started with almost 10,000 yachts operated by local charter companies mainly in Europe and in the Caribbean. The company's initial investment came through the founder and angel investors in US, Germany and Switzerland.

The beta version of the site went live in May 2011.

In 2015, Yachtico moved its headquarter to the United States. The company's team has a joint history with Research Park at Florida Atlantic University and hired some of their key people directly from the Florida Atlantic University. The company then announced the creation of 50 new jobs in Boca Raton.

In 2017, Yachtico was the winner of the "Florida Companies to Watch" award.

In 2020, Yachtico was listed among the Top 3 yacht charter companies in the U.S. for bare boat charters.

In 2025, YACHTICO was recognized as the award winner of "DEUTSCHLANDS BESTE ONLINE-PORTALE", a nationwide award by NTV honoring outstanding customer satisfaction and overall service quality.

In 2026, YACHTICO was recognized as the award winner of the "Deutscher Service-Preis", a nationwide award by NTV honoring outstanding service quality and customer satisfaction.

== Operation ==
Yachtico works with local yacht charter companies and has a presence in the Mediterranean Sea, Caribbean, Thailand and Malaysia.

Yachts can be chartered with an optional crew and some are also available as bare boat charter. Since October 2015, Yachtico yacht vacations were available within the Sabre travel agency network. Since 2017, Yachtico is the only Yacht Charter Supplier in the Travel Leaders Network.
