= Sugar Sand Park =

- Interactive map of Sugar Sand Park
- Type: Public Recreational Park
- Location: 300 S Military Trail; Boca Raton, Florida
- Coordinates: 26.347°N 80.1243°W
- Area: 132 acres (0.53 km^{2})
- Operator: City Of Boca Raton
- Status: Open all year
- Website: Sugar Sand Park

Sugar Sand Park is a municipal park located in Boca Raton, Florida. It was developed by the Greater Boca Raton Beach and Park District. It is operated by the City of Boca Raton. It has won several awards for excellence, such as "Best of the Best Parks" in 2007.

In 2017 the park was reopened after a major project to improve the park and make it accessible to people of all abilities. The playground is completely wheelchair accessible and several activity stations have been added for the benefit of children with physical and cognitive disabilities.

== Outdoor facilities ==
Sugar Sand Park has picnic tables, an outdoor science themed water playground, a carousel, an open field, 6 baseball fields, 2 basketball courts and an inline hockey rink.

== Field House ==
The Field House is an indoor sport facility with 2 large indoor basketball courts. It hosts several leagues, tournaments and special events. It is also home to several classes and activities such as fencing and tae kwon do. The Field House is open to public pick-up games of basketball and volleyball.
