= Boca Raton, Florida =

City in Palm Beach County, Florida

- City
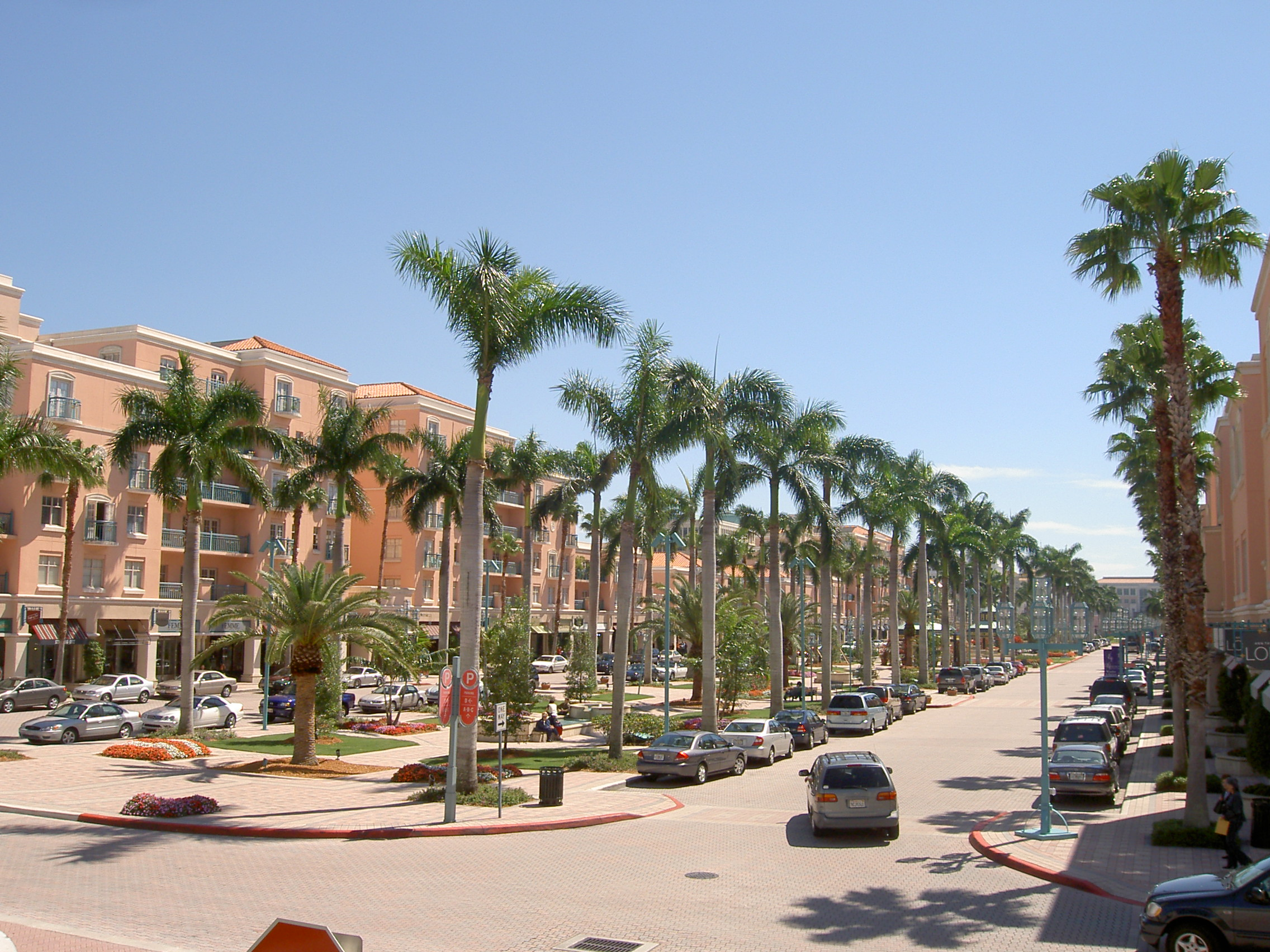
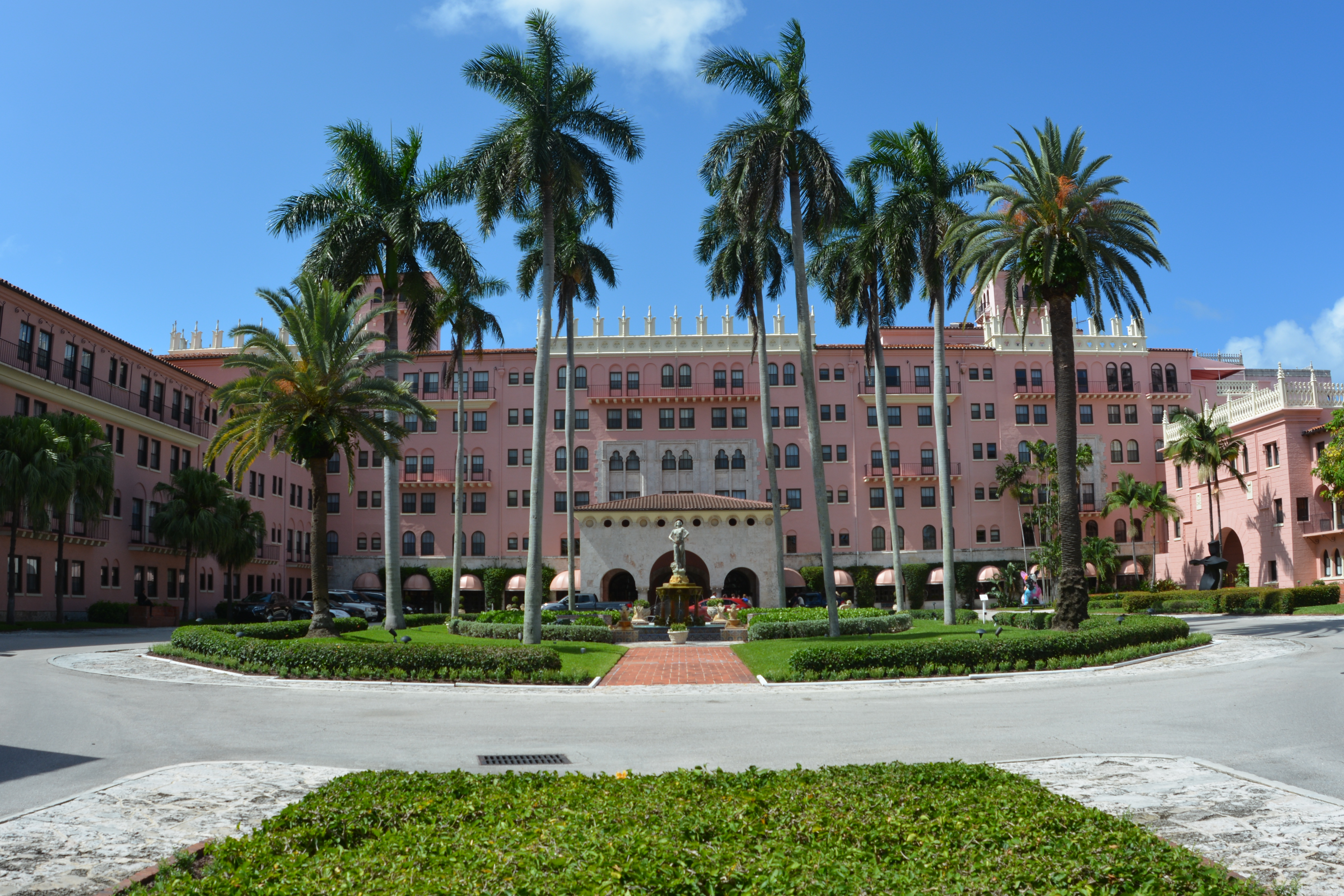
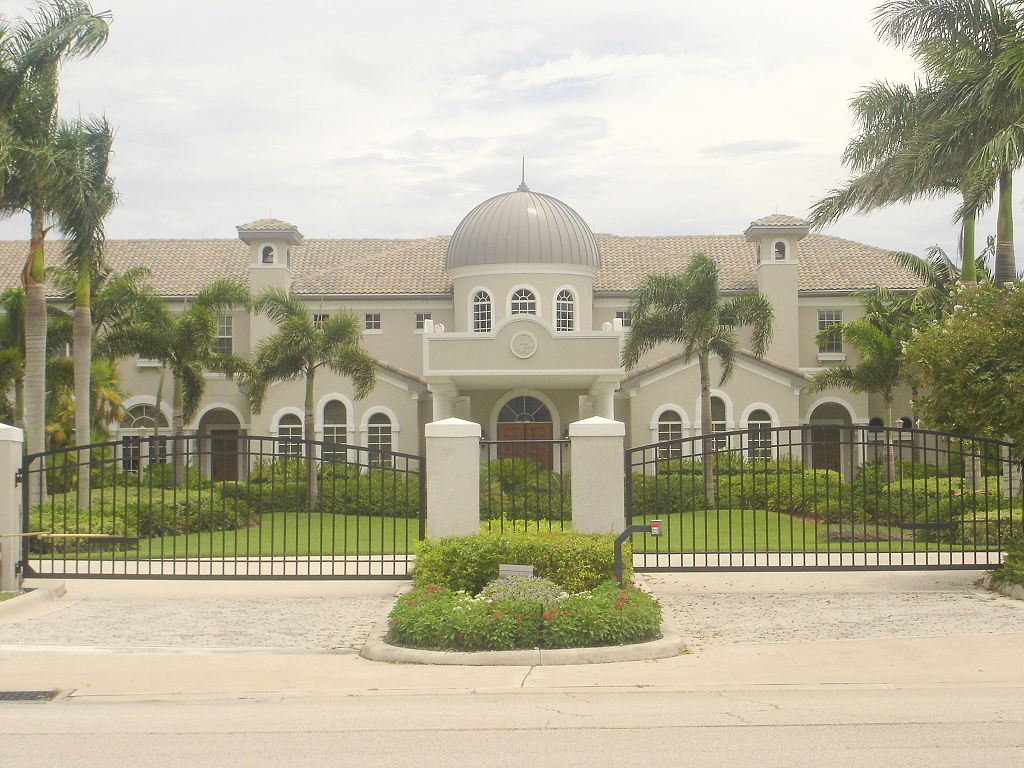
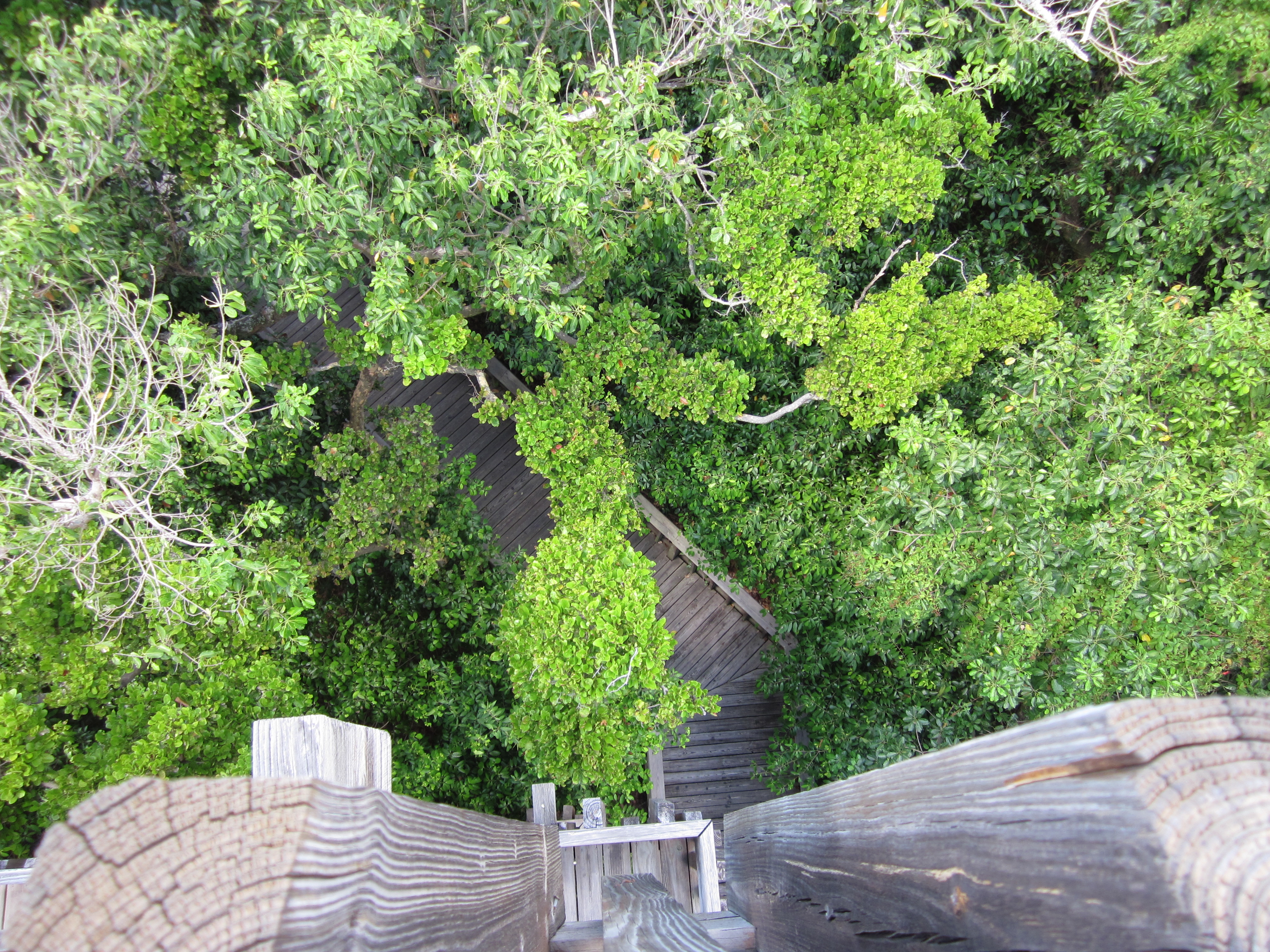
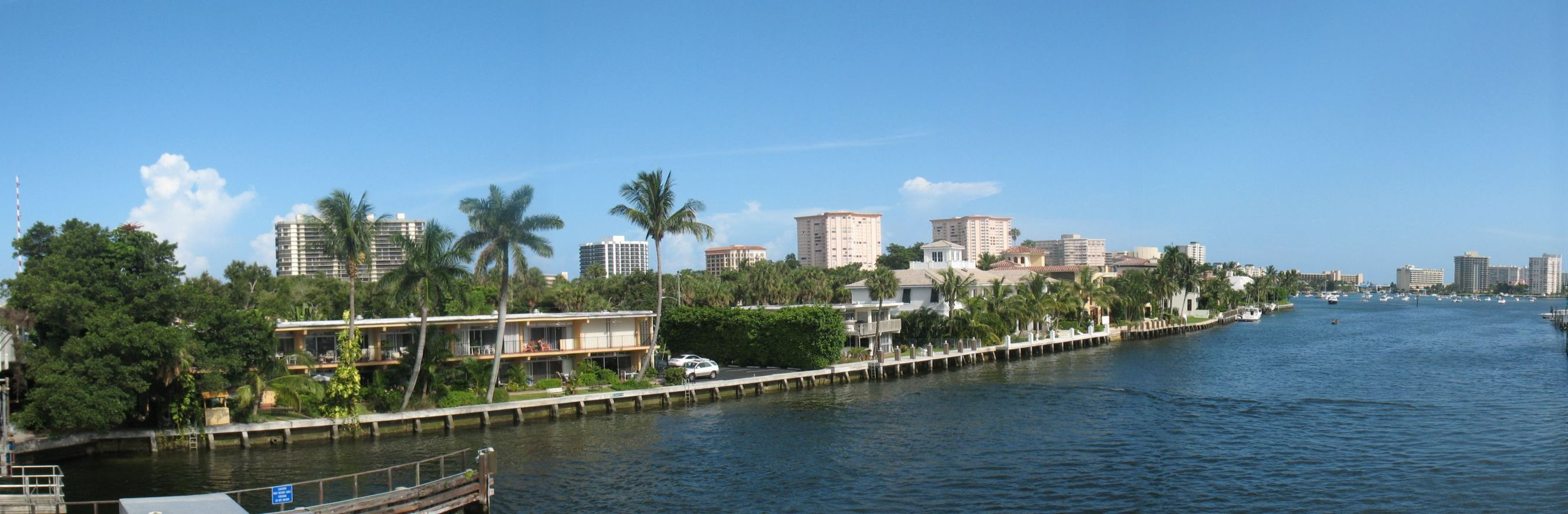
- Boca Raton skyline Mizner Park Boca Raton Resort Florida Atlantic University Gumbo Limbo Environmental Complex Intracoastal Waterway

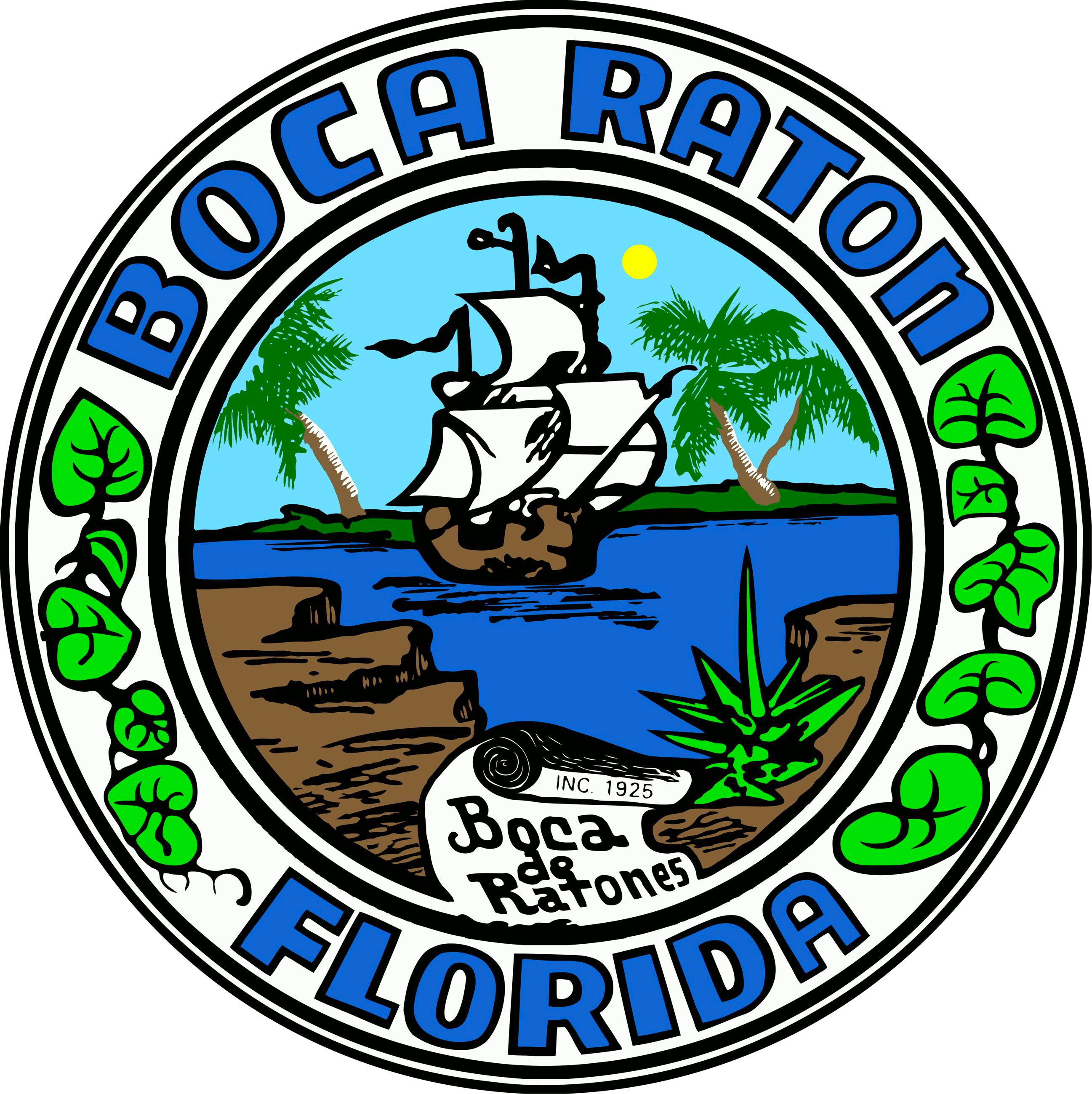
- Flag Seal
- Motto: A City for All Seasons
- Interactive map of Boca Raton, Florida
- Location in the United States Boca Raton (the United States) Boca Raton (North America)
- Coordinates: 26°22′40″N 80°06′50″W
- Country: United States
- State: Florida
- County: Palm Beach
- Settled (Boca Raton Settlement): c. 1895
- Incorporated: May 26, 1925

Government
  - Mayor: Andy Thomson (D)
  - Deputy Mayor: Michelle Grau
  - Council Members: Michelle Grau, Yvette Drucker, Jon Pearlman and Stacy Sipple

Area
  - Total: 31.59 sq mi (81.81 km^{2})
  - Land: 29.18 sq mi (75.57 km^{2})
  - Water: 2.41 sq mi (6.23 km^{2})
- Elevation: 13 ft (4.0 m)

Population (2020)
  - Total: 97,422
  - Estimate (2024): 102,238
  - Rank: 23rd in Florida
- Time zone: UTC−5 (EST)
  - Summer (DST): UTC−4 (EDT)
- ZIP Codes: 16 total ZIP Codes: 33427–33429, 33431–33434, 33464, 33481, 33486–33488, 33496–33499
- Area code: 561
- FIPS code: 12-07300
- GNIS feature ID: 2403887
- Website: myboca.us

Boca Raton (/ˌboʊkə rəˈtoʊn/ BOH-kə rə-TOHN; Spanish: Boca Ratón [ˈboka raˈton]) is a city in Palm Beach County, Florida, United States. The population was 97,422 in the 2020 census, and it ranked as the 23rd-largest city in Florida in 2022. Many people with a Boca Raton postal address live outside of municipal boundaries, such as in West Boca Raton. As a business center, the city also experiences significant daytime population increases. Boca Raton is 45 miles (72 km) north of Miami and is a principal city of the Miami metropolitan area.

It was first incorporated on August 2, 1924, as "Bocaratone", and then incorporated as "Boca Raton" on May 26, 1925. While the area had been inhabited by the Glades culture, as well as Spanish and later British colonial empires prior to its annexation by the United States, the city's present form was developed predominantly by American architect Addison Mizner starting in the 1920s. Mizner contributed to many buildings in the area having Mediterranean Revival or Spanish Colonial Revival architecture. Boca Raton also became a key city in the evolution of the digital computer industry. The city is the birthplace in the 1980s of IBM's first personal computer and various other technologies created by the company.

Still centered around luxury beach culture, the city today is dotted by many malls and shopping centers, including the Town Center at Boca Raton. The ODP Corporation, which operates Office Depot and OfficeMax, is headquartered here. Boca Raton is also home to Florida Atlantic University, Lynn University, and the Evert Tennis Academy, owned by former professional tennis player Chris Evert. The city has a strict development code for the size and types of commercial buildings, building signs, and advertisements that may be erected within its limits, which has led to major thoroughfares without billboards and large advertisements, as well as increased green spaces on roads.

== Name ==
=== Etymology ===
Boca Ratón comes from Spanish and literally translates to "Mouse Mouth" in English. Boca, meaning "mouth" (as in a river mouth), was a common term to describe an inlet on maps by sailors. The meaning of the word ratones for the area is less certain. Some claim that the word ratones appears in old Spanish maritime dictionaries referring to "rugged rocks or stony ground on the bottom of some ports and coastal outlets, where the cables rub against". Thus, one possible translation of Boca Raton is "Rugged Inlet".

Boca de Ratones appeared in early European maps as the name of the inlet in present-day Biscayne Bay in Miami-Dade County, while the area of Boca Raton was labeled Rio Seco, meaning "Dry River". Mapmakers later misplaced the name to the north and began referring to the body of water today known as Lake Boca Raton, as "Boca Ratone Lagoon" and later "Boca Ratone Sounde".

=== Pronunciation ===
City residents pronounce Raton as /rəˈtoʊn/. People not from the region often mispronounce this as /rəˈtɒn/ instead.

== History ==
=== Timeline ===
Timeline of Boca Raton, Florida
- 1890 – Bocaratone settled.
- 1896 – Florida East Coast Railway begins operating.
- 1909 – Bocaratone becomes part of newly created Palm Beach County.
- 1912 – Intracoastal Waterway opens.
- 1915
  - Telephone installed.
  - Board of Trade organized.
- 1918 – Ebenezer Baptist Church founded in Pearl City neighborhood.
- 1923 – Boca Raton Inlet bridge constructed.
- 1924
  - Town of "Boca Ratone" incorporated.
  - Addison Mizner chosen as town planner.
  - George Long becomes mayor.
- 1925
  - Town of "Boca Raton" incorporated.
  - Mizner Development Corporation in business.
- 1926
  - Cloister resort built.
  - Chamber of Commerce founded.
- 1927 – Town Hall built.
- 1928 – Water plant built.
- 1930
  - Railroad station built.
  - Population: 447.
- 1936 – Airport established.
- 1939 – Camino Real Bridge opens.
- 1942 – U.S. military Boca Raton Army Air Field established.
- 1947 – October: 1947 Cape Sable hurricane occurs.
- 1950
  - Art Guild established.
  - Population: 992.
- 1955 – Boca Raton News begins publication.
- 1960 – Population: 6,961.
- 1961
  - Florida Atlantic University founded.
  - Boca Raton Public Library building constructed.
- 1962
  - Lynn University established.
  - Saint Andrew's School opens.
- 1963 – Boca Inlet Bridge opens.
- 1964 – Boca Raton Theatre in business.
- 1970 – Population: 28,506.
- 1972 – Boca Raton Historical Society founded.
- 1979 – Jewish Floridian of South County newspaper begins publication.
- 1980
  - Pope John Paul II High School established.
  - Town Center at Boca Raton opens.
- 1981 – August: "IBM (International Business Machines) introduces the IBM PC from its Boca Raton factory."
- 1986 – Boca Raton Museum of Art active.
- 1989 – Boca Raton station opens.
- 1990
  - Old Floresta designated a city historic district.
  - Population: 61,492.
- 1991 – W.R. Grace & Co. headquarters relocated to Boca Raton from New York.
- 1998 – City website online (approximate date).
- 1999 – W.R. Grace & Co. headquarters moves away from Boca Raton.
- 2000
  - Muvico cinema in business.
  - Population: 83,255
- 2001 – Anthrax attack; Robert Stevens dies.
- 2004 – September: Hurricane Frances and Hurricane Jeanne occur.
- 2005 – October: Hurricane Wilma occurs.
- 2009 – Boca Raton News ceases publication.
- 2010 – Population: 84,392.
- 2012
  - October 22: United States presidential debate held in Boca Raton.
- 2014 – Susan Haynie elected mayor.
- 2017
  - Ted Deutch becomes U.S. representative for Florida's 22nd congressional district.
  - September: Hurricane Irma occurs.

=== Early history ===
The area where Boca Raton is now located was originally occupied by the Glades culture, a Native American tribe of hunter-gatherers who relocated seasonally and between shellfish sources, distinct from the Tequesta to the south and the Jaega to the north.

When Spain surrendered Florida to Britain in 1763, the remaining Tequestas, along with other Indians who had taken refuge in the Florida Keys, were evacuated to Cuba. In the 1770s, Bernard Romans reported seeing both abandoned villages and no native population in the area.

The area remained largely uninhabited for long afterwards, during the early years of Florida's incorporation in the United States. The first significant European settler to this area was Captain Thomas Moore Rickards in 1895, who resided in a house made of driftwood on the east side of the East Coast Canal, south of what is now the Palmetto Park Bridge. He surveyed and sold land from the canal to beyond the railroad north of what is now Palmetto Park Road. Early settlement in the area increased shortly after Henry Flagler's expansion of the Florida East Coast Railway, connecting West Palm Beach to Miami.

=== Addison Mizner's resort town ===
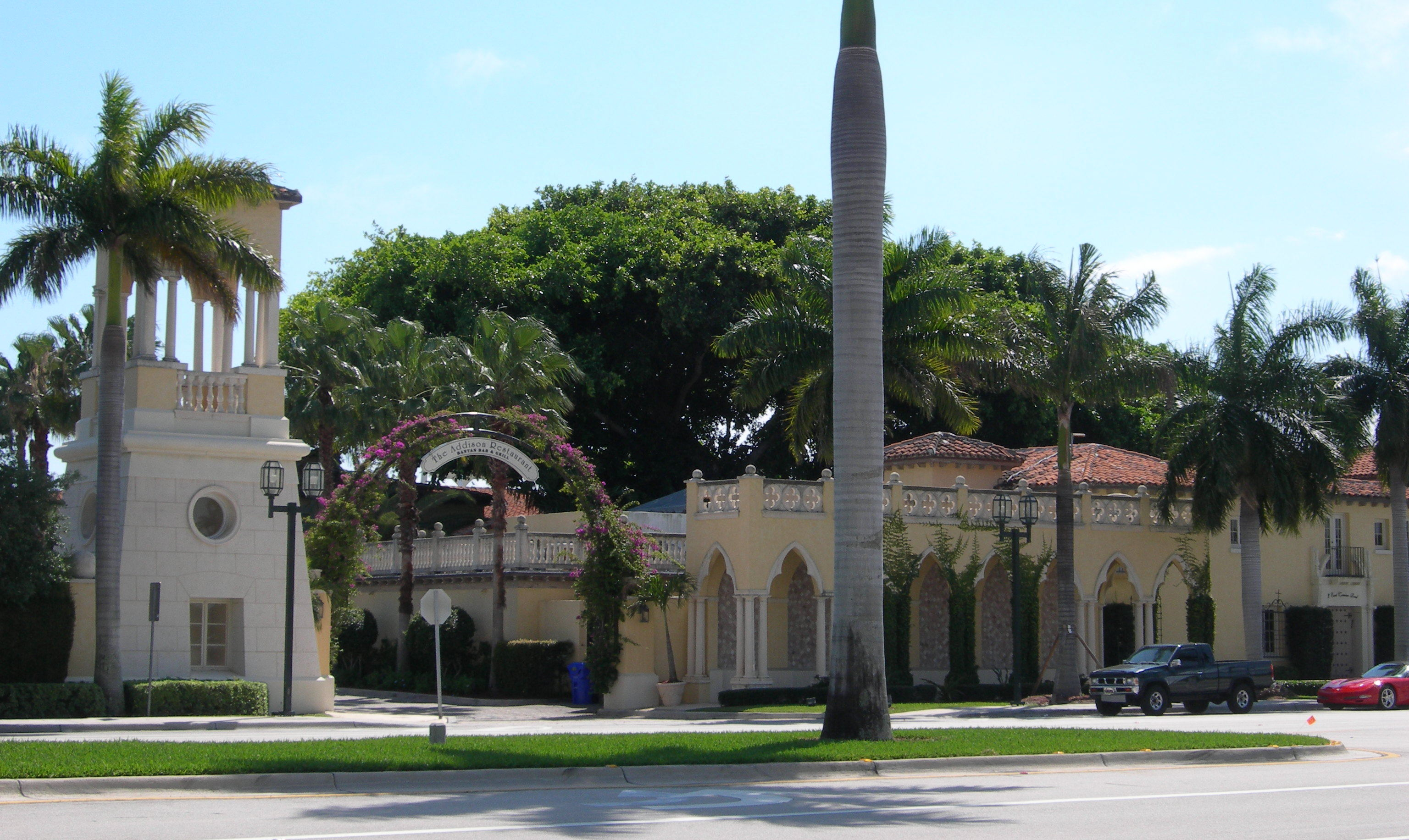
Mizner's Administrative Buildings

Boca Raton as a city was the creation of architect Addison Mizner. In 1920, Boca Raton was an unincorporated farming town with a population of 100. In 1925, Mizner announced his plan for "the foremost resort city on the North American continent," "a new exclusive social capital in America." After spending several years in Palm Beach, where, in his own words, he "did more than any one man to make the city beautiful," and designed the Everglades Club among many other buildings, in Boca Raton his plan was to create from scratch "a resort as splendid in its entirety as Palm Beach is in spots."

Activity in that area began at least a year, and probably more, before Mizner's announcement. Land acquisition, tens of thousands of acres, was the largest part. Reflecting his central role, immediately after Boca Raton was incorporated in 1924, Mizner was appointed Town Planner. The Mizner Development Company was incorporated in 1925, and promptly issued $5 million of stock, which was fully subscribed in less than a week. $500,000 was reserved for the "average Floridian"; the remainder was purchased by, as Addison called them, "noted personages", all with a Palm Beach connection: Lytle Hall, Harold Vanderbilt, J. Leonard Repogle, the Duchess of Sutherland, Rodman Wanamaker, Paris Singer, Irving Berlin, Madame Frances Alda, W. C. Robinson, Henry Huttleston Rogers Jr., D. H. Conkling, A. T. Herd, Porte, William Kissam Vanderbilt II, Elizabeth Arden, Jesse Livermore, Clarence H. Geist, and T. Coleman du Pont as chairman. Addison's brother Wilson also appears on the list of investors, but he had little to invest.

Instead of the existing Palmetto Park Road, the main street in Mizner's Boca was to be El Camino Real, 20 lanes wide, which Mizner fancifully translated as "The Royal Highway", referring to Spain's road network and to the road to Santa Fe and to the Spanish missions in California. (Spanish kings rarely or never travelled on these roads; "The Government Road" would be just as accurate.) It was originally to be circular, with a lagoon in the middle. Soon it became, in the plans, Boca Raton's main east–west street, to be 220 feet (67 m) wide and with a canal for pleasure boats in the center. (In the drawing of it on the cover of Mizner Development's first brochure is a Venetian gondola.) His statement that it was inspired by Botafogo, a neighborhood and beach in Rio de Janeiro, Brazil, is another of his many inventions of foreign "facts". Mizner, who never went to Brazil nor knew Brazilians, simply made it up because the name "Botafogo" ("fire thrower") sounded impressive, as was the concept of imitating Rio de Janeiro. (The only street in Rio de Janeiro anything like the supposed picture, actually an artist's conception, of "Botafogo" that Mizner included in his first catalogue, is the pt:Canal do Mangue, which runs down the middle of two streets, but is nowhere near Botafogo, a more elegant name than Mangue "mangrove".)

Only 0.5 miles (0.80 km) of the road was built (although the street has subsequently been extended to the west at normal scale). According to drawings, the centerpiece of the street was to be a canal for pleasure boats; it was never built. All streets were to be at least 60 feet (18 m) wide.

His first buildings in Boca Raton were his Administrative Buildings, on El Camino Real (in 2018 the Addison Restaurant), and a small hotel to house interested investors. Mizner designed Boca's first town hall/police station/fire station/library, although the design actually built is much smaller and less expensive than what Mizner planned. Today (2018) it is the Boca Raton History Museum, which houses Boca's Welcome Center and the Boca Raton Historical Society.

The hotel was his Cloister Inn, built in 1926 and later renamed the Boca Raton Resort & Club. Today a Ritz-Carlton, it is one of the only "5 star" hotels in Florida. The 1969 addition of its "pink tower" hotel building is visible from miles away on the Intracoastal Waterway.

Because of the end of the Florida land boom of the 1920s and the 1926 Miami hurricane, the Mizner Development Corporation went into bankruptcy in 1927. Little of Mizner's Boca Raton was ever built: his Administration Buildings, the Cloister Inn, 1/2 mile of El Camino Real, the small Dunagan Apartments (demolished), a few houses near the Cloister Inn (demolished), the Spanish Village neighborhood, and a few small houses in what is now the Old Floresta Historic District neighborhood.

=== World War II Army Air Force Base ===
During World War II, some of the land used by the Japanese farmers of the Yamato Colony was confiscated and used as the site of the Boca Raton Army Air Force Base, a major training facility for B-29 bomber crews and the only facility in the U.S. training radar operators. Much of the Boca Raton Army Airfield was later donated to Palm Beach County and became the grounds of Florida Atlantic University. Many of FAU's parking lots are former runways of the airbase. When viewed from above, the site's layout for its previous use as an airfield is plainly evident. Boca Raton Airport's runway was once part of the original airbase, and is still active to this day, although the runway has been rebuilt. Army School Building #3 (T-604) of the Army Air Forces Base has survived as the office building for the Cynthia Gardens apartment complex on Northwest 4th Avenue.

=== Post-World War II history ===
Boca Raton was the site of two now vanished amusement parks, Africa U.S.A. (1953–1961) and Ancient America (1953–1959). Africa U.S.A. was a wild animal park in which tourists rode a "Jeep Safari Train" through the park. There were no fences separating the animals from the tourists. It is now the Camino Gardens subdivision one mile west of the Boca Raton Hotel. A red wooden bridge and remnants from the Watusi Geyser and Zambezi Falls, a 30-foot waterfall, from Africa USA can still be seen at the entrance to Camino Gardens. Ancient America was built surrounding a real Native American burial mound. Today, the mound is still visible within the Boca Marina & Yacht Club neighborhood on U.S. 1 near Yamato Road.

==== IBM ====
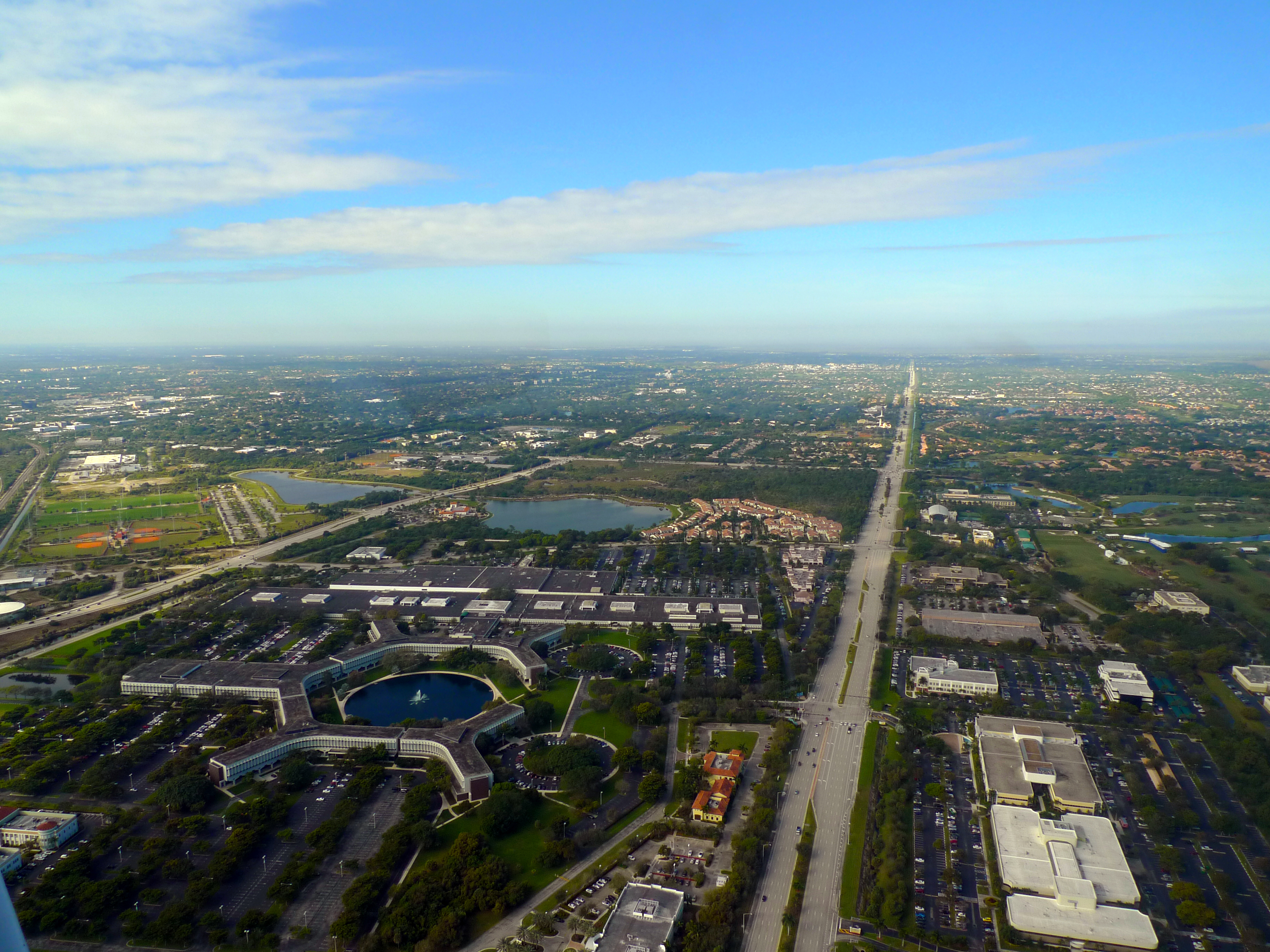
IBM's former South Florida laboratories, where the IBM PC was created, alongside Yamato Road.

In the late 1960s, IBM announced their intentions to open a manufacturing plant in the area. In 1965, well before the extension of I-95 into Southern Florida, IBM, working in secret with the Arvida corporation, quietly purchased several hundred acres of real estate west of the CSX rail line and northwest of Florida Atlantic University. Originally situated in unincorporated Palm Beach County, the site was annexed into Boca Raton almost a year following its dedication in 1970.

Construction of IBM's main complex began in 1967, designed by Marcel Breuer, and the manufacturing and office complex was dedicated in March 1970. The campus was designed with self-sufficiency in mind and sported its own electrical substation, water pumping station, and rail spur.

By 1984 IBM was Palm Beach County's largest corporate employer, with 8,500 Boca Raton employees. Among other noteworthy IT accomplishments, such as the mass production of the System/360 and development of the Series/1 mainframe computers, IBM's main complex was the birthplace of the IBM PC, which later evolved into the IBM Personal System/2, developed in nearby Delray Beach. Starting in 1987, IBM relocated its manufacturing for what became the IBM PC division to Research Triangle Park in Raleigh, North Carolina, and converted the manufacturing facilities into offices and laboratories, later producing products such as the OS/2 operating system and VoiceType Dictation, later known as ViaVoice voice-recognition software.

IBM maintained its facilities in the South Florida area until 1996, when the facility was closed and sold to Blue Lake Real Estate. The site was sold to T-REX Management Consortium, then to the Blackstone Group in 2005, who renamed it the Boca Corporate Center and Campus. The site was later renamed the Boca Raton Innovation Campus (BRiC). Crocker Partners, noted for its development of Mizner Park and Office Depot headquarters, purchased BRiC in April 2018.

What used to be IBM's Building 051, an annex separated from the former main IBM campus by Spanish River Boulevard, was donated to the Palm Beach County School District and converted into Don Estridge High Tech Middle School. It is named after Don Estridge, whose team was responsible for developing the IBM PC. IBM returned in July 2001, opening the software development laboratory at Beacon Square off Congress Avenue.

==== 2001 anthrax attack ====
Boca Raton was the site of the first recognized case of the 2001 anthrax attacks in the United States following the September 11 attacks. On October 4, 2001, health officials confirmed that Robert Stevens, a photo editor at American Media, Inc., had contracted inhalational anthrax after exposure to anthrax-contaminated mail at the company's headquarters in Boca Raton. Stevens died the following day. A subsequent investigation identified a second inhalational anthrax case among AMI employees and found Bacillus anthracis spores at the company's offices and several local postal facilities. The investigation marked the beginning of the public health response to the anthrax attacks, in which letters containing anthrax spores were mailed to media organizations and members of the United States Senate.

==== Suburban expansion ====
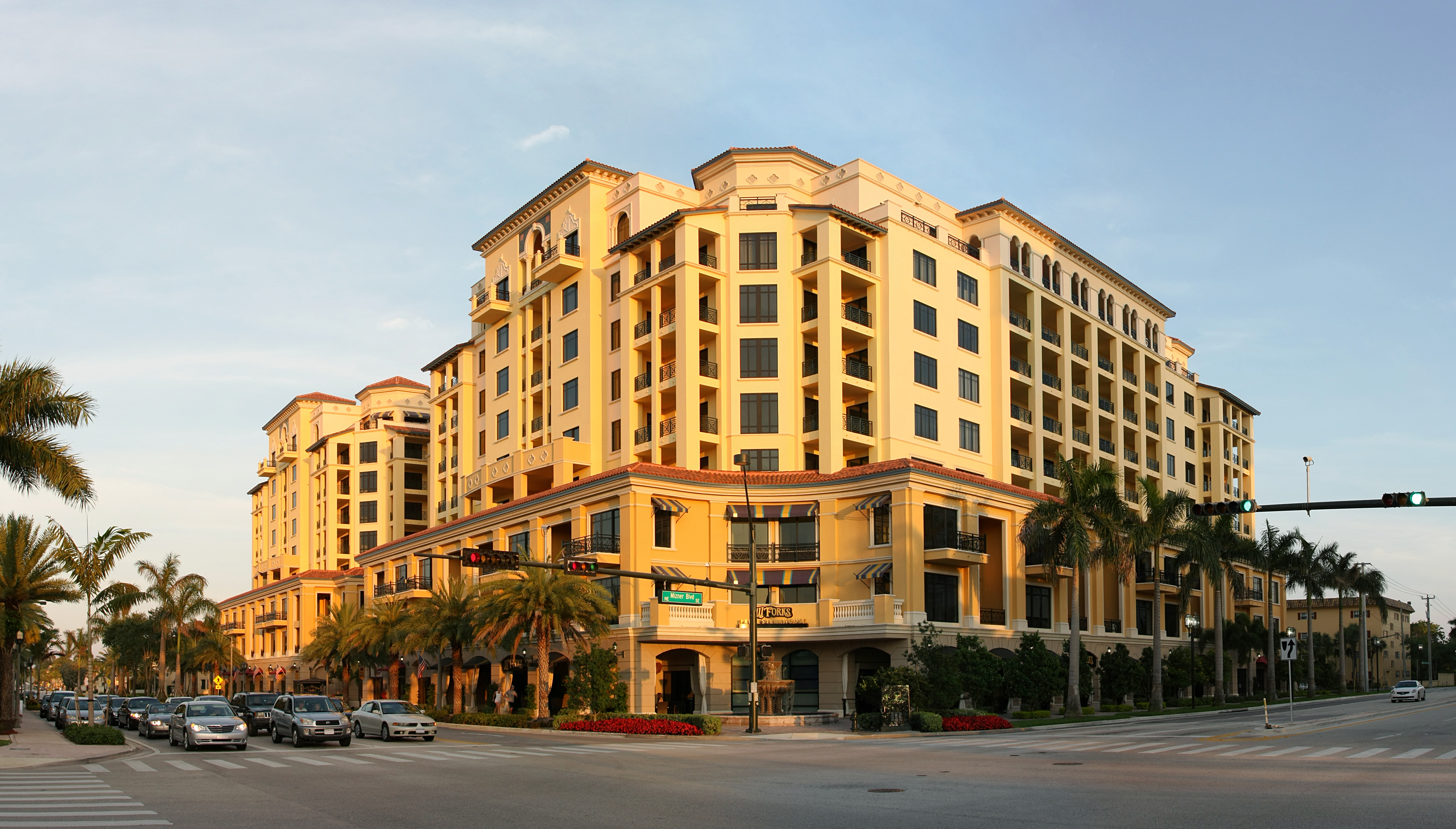
Palmetto Park Road and Mizner Boulevard intersection.

As development continued to focus to the west of the city in the 1980s and 1990s, the mall area known as Town Center at Boca Raton became the geographic center of what is referred to as West Boca Raton, though this mall was not annexed into the city until 2004.

In 1991, the downtown outdoor shopping and dining center, Mizner Park, was completed over the site of the old Boca Raton Mall. It has since become a cultural center for southern Palm Beach County. Featuring a landscaped central park between the two main roads (collectively called Plaza Real) with stores only on the outside of the roads, Mizner Park resembles a Mediterranean suburban "town center" with a more contemporary look. It features many restaurants and is home to the Boca Raton Museum of Art, which moved to the new facility in 2001. In 2002, a new amphitheater was built, replacing a smaller one and providing a large-capacity outdoor venue where concerts and other performances are held. The Mizner Park Cultural Center, an indoor performing arts/comedy show theater is located to the southwest of the amphitheater within the Mizner Park property.

The National Cartoon Museum was built on the southwest edge of Mizner Park in 1996. Open for six years, the museum relocated to its original home in New York City in 2002.

Forbes ranked Boca Raton's Royal Palm Yacht and Country Club the third most exclusive gated community in the US in 2017. Many mansions and estates have been built and reflect the high real estate values. 18.1% of homes for sale are within the $655,000–$966,000 range, 8.5% in the $966,000–$1.288 million range, and 11.9% in the $1.288 million plus range. Since the mid-2010s, there has been a developing boom such as the building of the Mandarin Oriental's Residences, remodeling of Downtown Boca Raton's Mizner Park, and development around Florida Atlantic University and Lynn University.

On November 2, 2004, the voters of the Via Verde Association, Waterside, Deerhurst Association (Boca South), Marina Del Mar Association, Rio Del Mar Association (both originally Boca Del Mar communities), and Heatherwood of Boca Raton Condominium Association approved annexation into the Boca Raton city limits, increasing the city land area to 29.6 square miles (77 km^{2}). A new gated community called Royal Palm Polo was annexed to the City of Boca Raton, which is the only jurisdiction north of Clint Moore Road.

== Geography ==
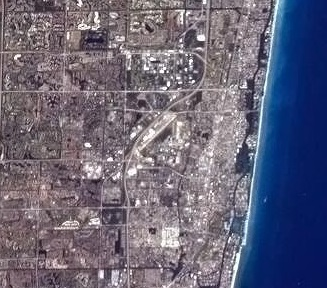
Boca Raton, seen from the International Space Station.

According to the United States Census Bureau, the city has an area of 29.1 sq mi (75.4 km^{2}), of which 27.2 sq mi (70.4 km^{2}) of this is land and 1.9 sq mi (5.0 km^{2}) of it (6.63%) is water. Boca Raton is a "principal city" (as defined by the Census Bureau) of the Miami Metropolitan Area. Approximately 1 square mile is on the barrier island Deerfield Beach Island (DBI), also colloquially known as Deerfield Cay. Like other South Florida cities, Boca Raton has a water table that does not permit building basements, however plumbing and sewage is constructed underneath the homes and streets, in addition to electrical systems in some areas. There are several high points in the city, such as 4th Avenue which is aptly named "High Street". The highest point in this area is the guard shack at Camino Gardens, which is 24 ft (7.3 m) above sea level. The Boca Raton Hotel's Beach Club rests at 23 ft (7.0 m) above sea level.

Several small tunnels run under roads in Boca, but the roads are built up several feet at these locations, or are on dunes. Several of these tunnels are under State Road A1A at Spanish River Park, from the west side of the road where parking is available to beachgoers, to the east side of the road, which is where the beach is located. State Road A1A is already higher than the surrounding land here due to sand dunes formed by erosion and other natural features.

=== Neighborhoods ===
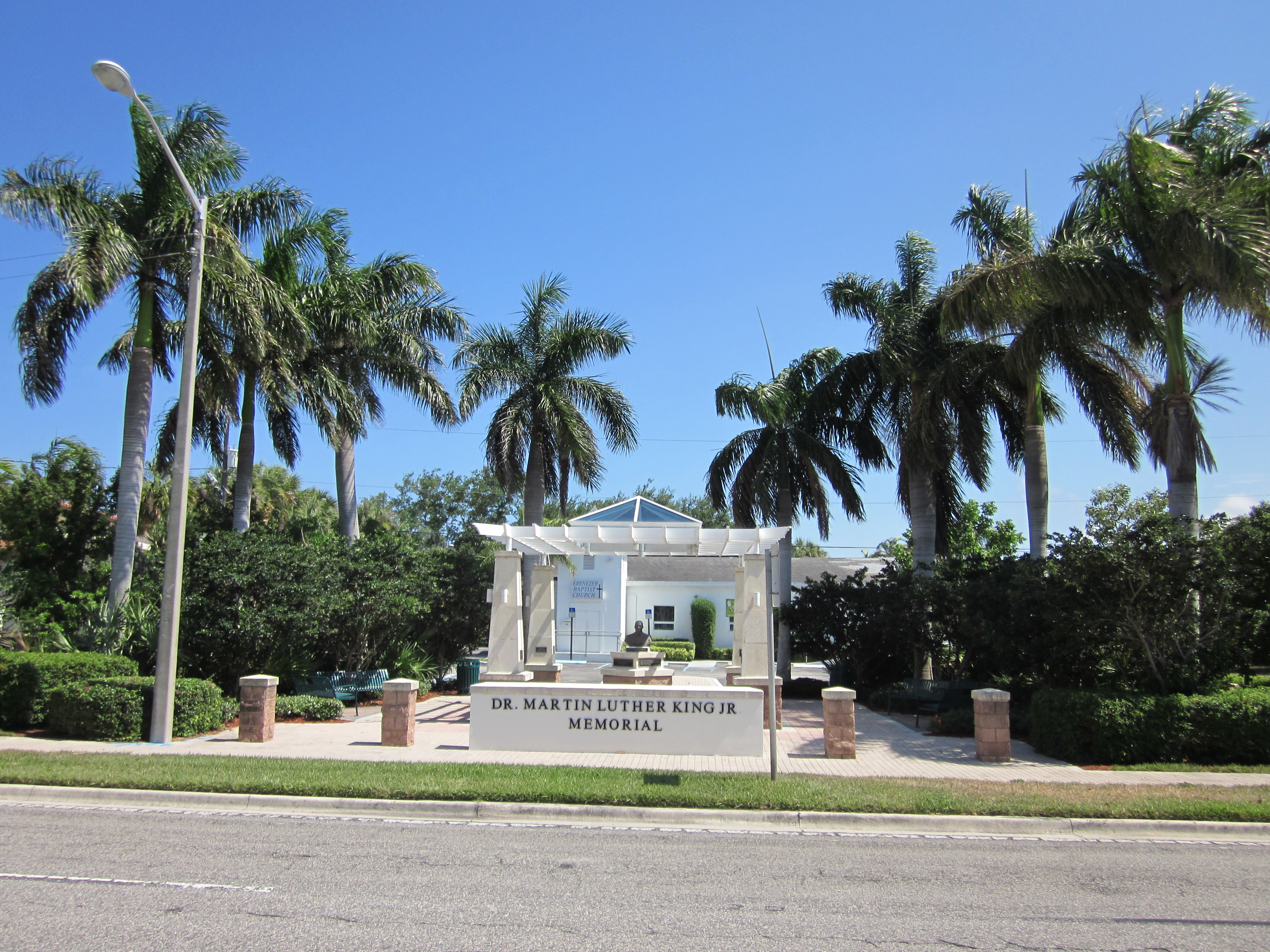
Martin Luther King Jr. Memorial in Pearl City

Pearl City is a neighborhood in Boca Raton, immediately north of downtown and within city limits. The neighborhood was originally platted on May 30, 1915, for the blue-collar African Americans employed at the Boca Raton Resort and similar establishments, on area farms, in construction, and various other jobs.

=== Climate ===
Boca Raton has a tropical rainforest climate (Köppen climate classification Af), as its driest month (December) averages 2.46 inches or 62.5 millimetres of rainfall, narrowly meeting the minimum standard of 60 millimetres or 2.36 inches during the driest month to qualify for that designation. In general the climate is very warm to hot, humid, and sunny much of the year, although daily thundershowers occur in the hot season from June through September. Boca Raton is frost free. The warm tropical climate in South Florida supports the growth of tropical trees and plants such as the coconut palm that was introduced hundreds of years ago to Florida in nearby West Palm Beach.

Winter high temperatures are typically in the 75 to 83 °F (23.9 to 28.3 °C) range, while summer high temperatures are about 87 to 92 °F (30.6 to 33.3 °C).

Climate data for Boca Raton, Florida
Month	Jan	Feb	Mar	Apr	May	Jun	Jul	Aug	Sep	Oct	Nov	Dec	Year
Mean daily maximum °F (°C)	76 (24)	77 (25)	80 (27)	83 (28)	86 (30)	88 (31)	91 (33)	91 (33)	89 (32)	86 (30)	82 (28)	78 (26)	84 (29)
Mean daily minimum °F (°C)	58 (14)	60 (16)	63 (17)	67 (19)	72 (22)	75 (24)	76 (24)	75 (24)	75 (24)	71 (22)	66 (19)	61 (16)	68 (20)
Average rainfall inches (mm)	2.78 (71)	2.85 (72)	3.00 (76)	3.40 (86)	5.73 (146)	7.31 (186)	5.94 (151)	6.91 (176)	7.01 (178)	5.73 (146)	4.24 (108)	2.46 (62)	57.27 (1,455)
Source: The Weather Channel

== Demographics ==
Historical population
Census	Pop.	Note	%±
1930	447		—
1940	723		61.7%
1950	992		37.2%
1960	6,961		601.7%
1970	28,506		309.5%
1980	49,505		73.7%
1990	61,492		24.2%
2000	74,764		21.6%
2010	84,392		12.9%
2020	97,422		15.4%
2024 (est.)	102,238	▲	4.9%
U.S. Decennial Census; QuickFacts 1930–1970 1980 1990; 2000 2010 2020 2024

Boca Raton and other parts of Palm Beach County have a significant Jewish population. Certain areas outside of Boca Raton city limits, such as the Sandalfoot Cove community, have significant populations of Brazilian and other Latino immigrants.

=== Racial and ethnic composition ===
Historical demographics	2020	2010	2000	1990	1980
White (non-Hispanic)	70.8%	79.1%	84.2%	89.7%	92.8%
Hispanic or Latino	15.2%	11.9%	8.5%	5.6%	4.5%
Black or African American (non-Hispanic)	5.3%	5.0%	3.6%	2.8%	1.9%
Asian American (non-Hispanic)	3.3%	2.4%	2.0%	1.9%	0.9%
Native American (non-Hispanic)	0.1%	0.1%	0.1%	0.1%	0.9%
Some other race (non-Hispanic)	0.9%	0.3%	0.2%	< 0.1%	0.9%
Two or more races (non-Hispanic)	4.5%	1.1%	1.3%	N/A	N/A
Population	97,422	84,392	74,764	61,492	49,505

=== 2020 census ===
As of the 2020 census, Boca Raton had a population of 97,422. The median age was 45.4 years. 16.1% of residents were under the age of 18, 60.8% were between 18 and 64, and 23.1% were 65 years of age or older. For every 100 females there were 93.3 males, and for every 100 females age 18 and over there were 91.1 males age 18 and over.

100.0% of residents lived in urban areas, while 0.0% lived in rural areas.

There were 40,827 households in Boca Raton, of which 22.8% had children under the age of 18 living in them. Of all households, 46.5% were married-couple households, 19.7% were households with a male householder and no spouse or partner present, and 27.8% were households with a female householder and no spouse or partner present. The average household size was 2.00 people, and 32.2% of all households were made up of individuals with 14.2% having someone living alone who was 65 years of age or older.

There were 48,728 housing units, of which 16.2% were vacant. The homeowner vacancy rate was 1.7% and the rental vacancy rate was 10.2%.

Racial composition as of the 2020 census
Race	Number	Percent
White	72,783	74.7%
Black or African American	5,390	5.5%
American Indian and Alaska Native	268	0.3%
Asian	3,254	3.3%
Native Hawaiian and Other Pacific Islander	46	0.0%
Some other race	3,613	3.7%
Two or more races	12,068	12.4%
Hispanic or Latino (of any race)	14,768	15.2%

=== Demographic characteristics ===
Demographic characteristics	2020	2010	2000	1990	1980
Housing units	48,728	44,539	37,547	26,297	20,247
Persons per household	2.00	1.89	2.04	2.34	2.45
Sex Ratio	93.3	95.7	95.1	92.3	91.0
Ages 0–17	16.1%	17.2%	18.4%	17.2%	18.7%
Ages 18–64	60.8%	61.9%	62.3%	61.3%	57.6%
Ages 65 +	23.1%	21.0%	19.3%	21.5%	23.7%
Median age	45.4	45.4	42.9	41.1	42.0
Population	97,422	84,392	74,764	61,492	49,505

=== Economic indicators ===
Economic indicators
2017–21 American Community Survey	Boca Raton	Palm Beach County	Florida
Median income	$46,033	$36,431	$34,367
Median household income	$89,776	$68,874	$61,777
Poverty Rate	9.2%	11.6%	13.1%
High school diploma	95.9%	89.1%	89.0%
Bachelor's degree	58.3%	38.0%	31.5%
Advanced degree	23.1%	15.0%	11.7%

Boca Raton is known for its affluent and educated social community. According to Forbes, Boca Raton has three of the ten most expensive gated communities in the U.S. The Royal Palm Yacht and Country Club holds the #1 spot, The Sanctuary takes #6, and Le Lac takes the #8 spot.

=== Language ===
Language spoken at home (Note: Language spoken at home among residents at least five years old; only languages (or language groups) which at least 2% of residents have spoken at any time since 1980 are mentioned)	2015 (Note: Refers to 2013–2017 American Community Survey data; the last Decennial Census where language data was collected was in the 2000 census)	2010 (Note: Refers to 2008–2012 American Community Survey data; the last Decennial Census where language data was collected was in the 2000 census)	2000	1990	1980
English only	75.0%	77.4%	79.2%	84.4%	90.0%
Spanish or Spanish Creole	10.9%	10.9%	9.2%	6.0%	4.2%
French or Haitian Creole	2.3%	2.2%	2.7%	1.7%	0.6%
Other Languages	11.8%	9.5%	8.9%	7.9%	5.2%

=== Nativity ===
Nativity	2015 (Note: Refers to 2013–2017 American Community Survey data; the last Decennial Census where foreign-born population data was collected was in the 2000 census)	2010 (Note: Refers to 2008–2012 American Community Survey data; the last Decennial Census where foreign-born population data was collected was in the 2000 census)	2000	1990	1980
% population native-born	78.9%	81.2%	82.0%	86.7%	89.9%
... born in the United States	76.8%	79.7%	80.4%	85.2%	89.0%
... born in Puerto Rico or Island Areas	0.5%	0.3%	0.5%	0.4%	0.9%
... born to American parents abroad	1.6%	1.2%	1.1%	1.0%	0.9%
% population foreign-born (Note: Only countries of birth which at least 2% of residents were born in at any time since 1980 are mentioned; no countries meet this criterion for the city of Boca Raton so none of them are mentioned)	21.1%	18.8%	18.0%	13.3%	10.1%

== Culture and attractions ==
=== Festivals and events ===
The Boca Raton Bowl is a National Collegiate Athletic Association (NCAA) sanctioned Division I college football bowl game that features the Mid-American Conference (MAC) facing off against an opponent from the American Athletic Conference (AAC) or Conference USA (C-USA) in alternating years. Each conference participates four times during the six-year agreement, which began with the 2014 season. The Bowl is held at FAU Stadium.

St. Mark Greek Orthodox Church in Boca Raton hosts a popular Greek festival during the last weekend of January. An estimated 15,000 people attended the festival in 2018.

Additionally, the city hosts the "Festival of the Arts BOCA" annually during the spring, and the Brazilian Beat Festival in the fall.

=== Mizner Park ===
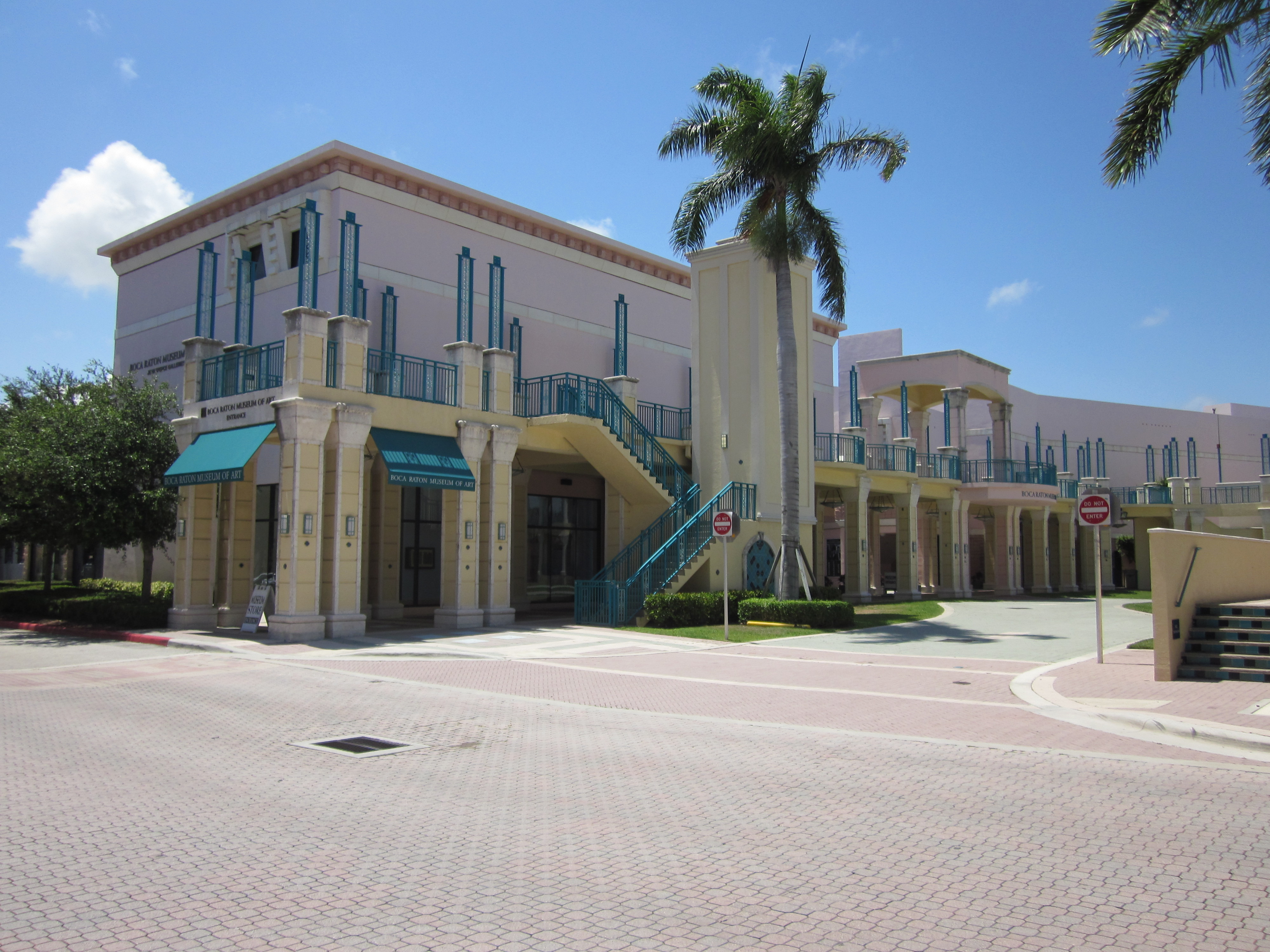
Boca Raton Museum of Art

Mizner Park is a lifestyle center in downtown Boca Raton. The area contains several stores and fashion boutiques, restaurants, an iPic movie theater, and housing. The Center for the Arts at Mizner Park is on the development's north end, which includes the Boca Raton Museum of Art and the Count de Hoernele Amphitheater. Royal Palm Place is adjacent to Mizner Park, and it contains upscale shopping, restaurants, and apartments.

=== Town Center Mall ===
Town Center at Boca Raton is an upscale super-regional shopping center in Boca Raton that is the largest enclosed and conventional shopping mall within Palm Beach County, and the third largest by square feet in South Florida, behind Sawgrass Mills and Aventura Mall.

In 1999, the Simon Property Group bought Town Center at Boca Raton and began building a new wing on its southeastern side, and completed renovations in 2018.

Seritage Growth Properties plans to build a lifestyle center called The Collection at Boca Town Center which will provide shopping, dining, and entertainment.

Crocker Partners will build a Restaurant Row near the mall.

=== Beaches and parks ===
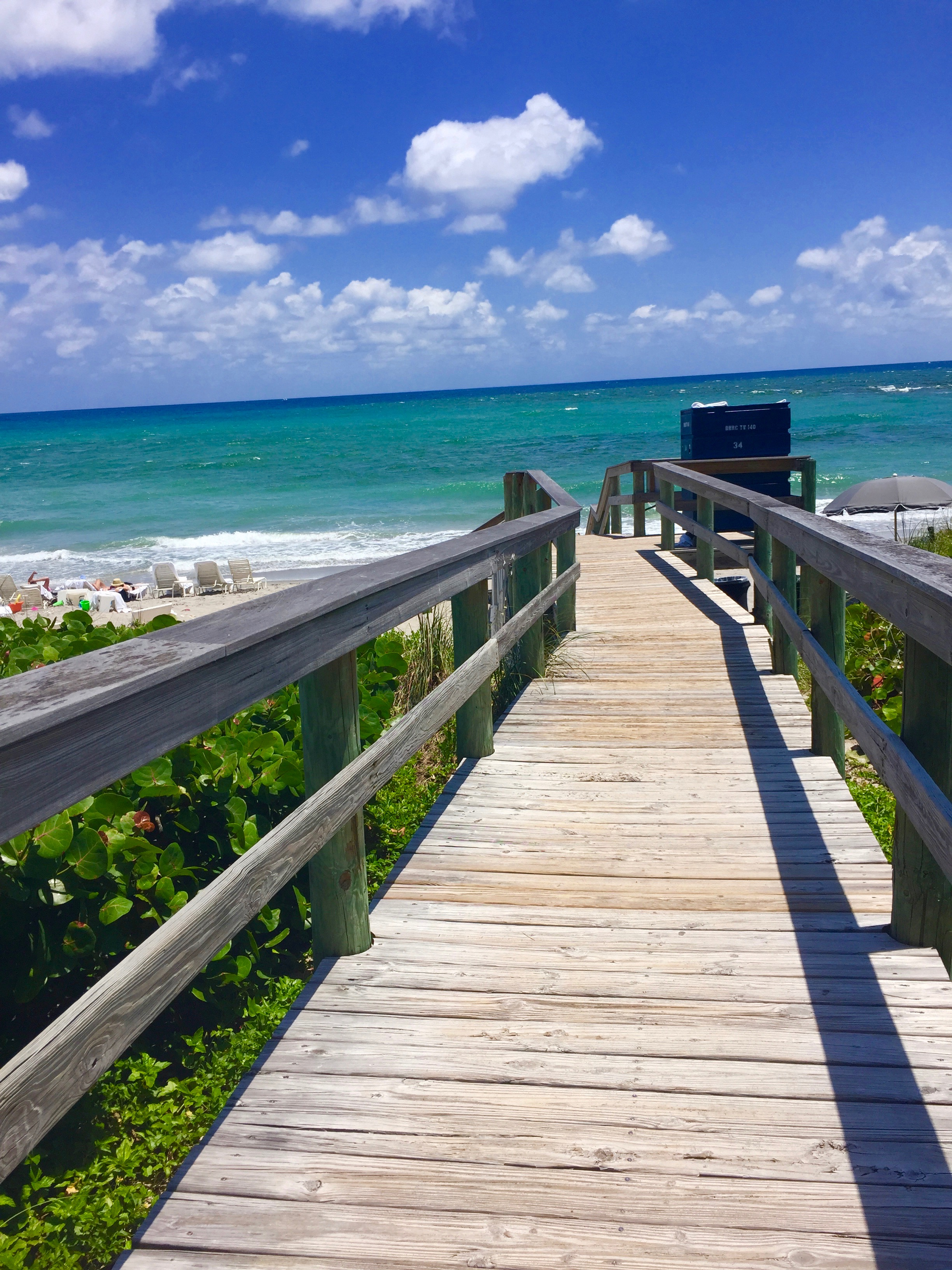
Beach entrance in Boca Raton

Boca Raton's eastern coast has two miles of beaches, notably Red Reef Park and South Inlet Park.

The beach at Spanish River Park was awarded the international Blue Flag beach award, an annual award recognizing high-quality beaches.

Red Reef Park has the Gumbo Limbo Environmental Complex, an environmental education center. Founded in 1984, Gumbo Limbo is a cooperative project of the City of Boca Raton, Greater Boca Raton Beach and Park District, Florida Atlantic University, and Friends of Gumbo Limbo.

Sugar Sand Park is a municipal park in Boca Raton. It contains the Children's Science Explorium.

=== Other ===
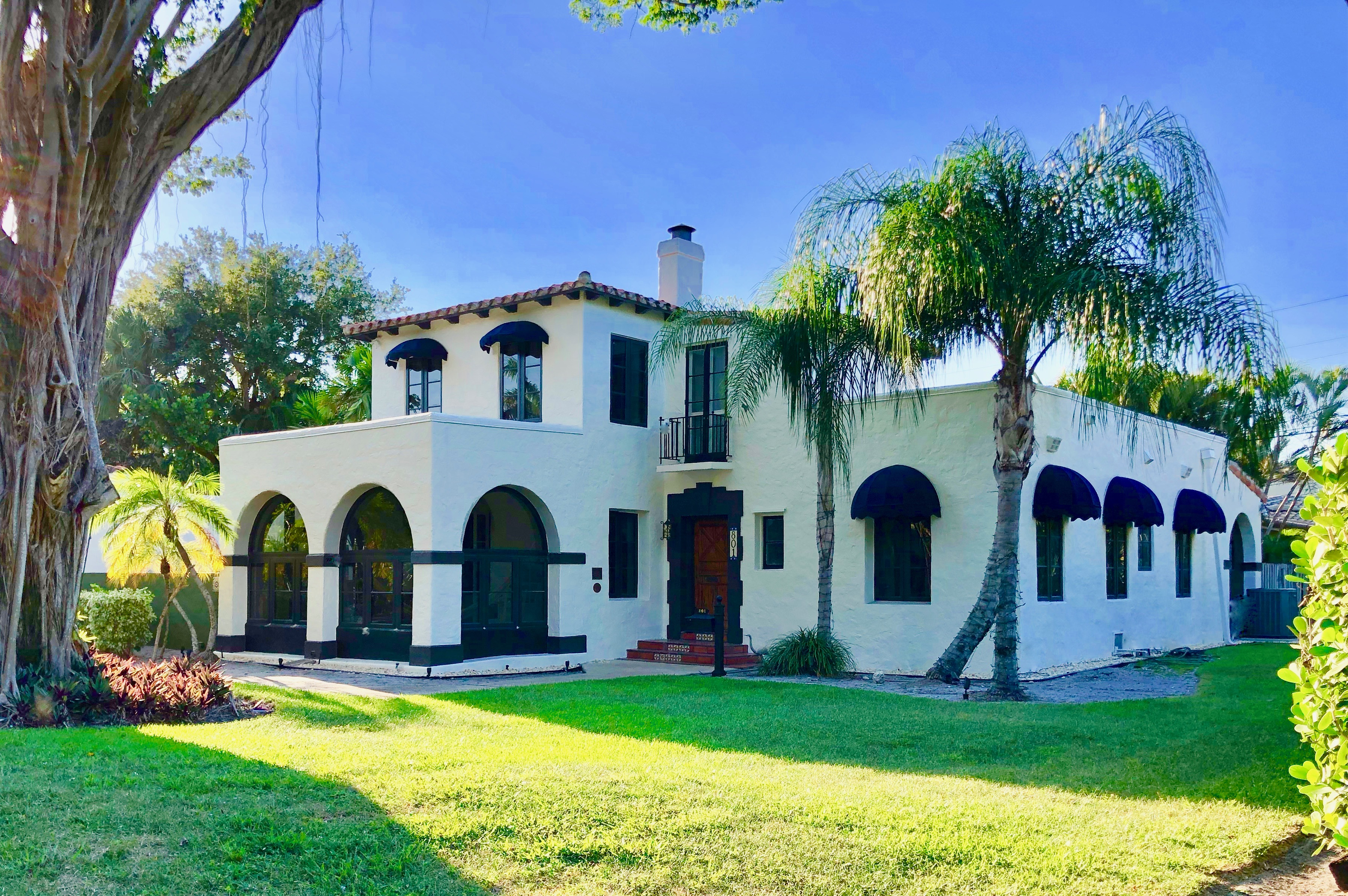
The Fred C. Aiken House is listed on the National Register of Historic Places

Old Floresta Historic District has several historic houses listed on the National Register of Historic Places.

Boca Raton is home to the Wick Theatre & Costume Museum.

The city also has a number of small cultural institutions and historical markers that highlight its development during the land boom of the 1920s, particularly in neighborhoods like Pearl City and Old Floresta.

== Economy ==
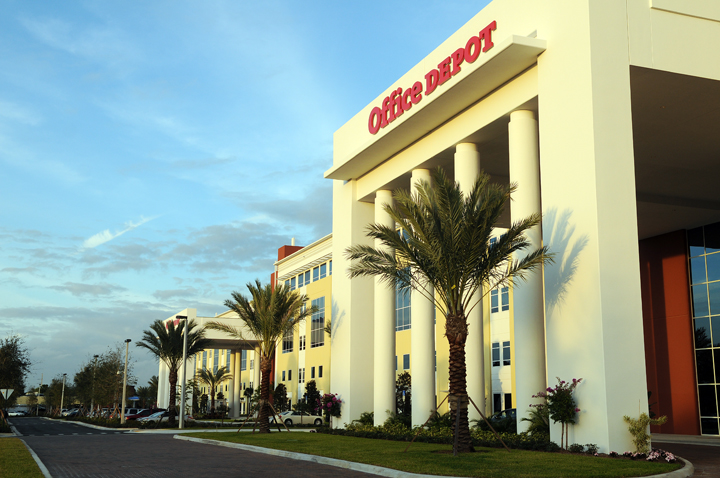
Office Depot's corporate headquarters

Office Depot, a supplier of office products and services, has its global headquarters on a 28-acre campus in the city. The GEO Group also has its headquarters in Boca Raton based out of One Park Place. Media company Friend Finder Networks, e-retailer Vitacost, YACHTICO, Carmela Coffee, and Celsius Holdings are also headquartered in the city.

=== Top employers ===
As of 2024, the top employers in the city were:

Rank	Employer	Number of employees
1	Florida Atlantic University	6,335
2	Baptist Health Hospital	3,135
3	Office Depot (Headquarters)	2,000
4	City of Boca Raton	1,810
5	National Council on Compensation Insurance	800
6	Johnson Controls / Tyco	741
7	IBM	600
8	ADT Security Services (Headquarters)	500
9	US Foods	374
10	Newell Brands	350

== Education ==
=== Public schools ===
Public education is provided and managed by The School District of Palm Beach County, the thirteenth-largest public school district in the United States. Boca Raton is also home to several notable private and religious schools.

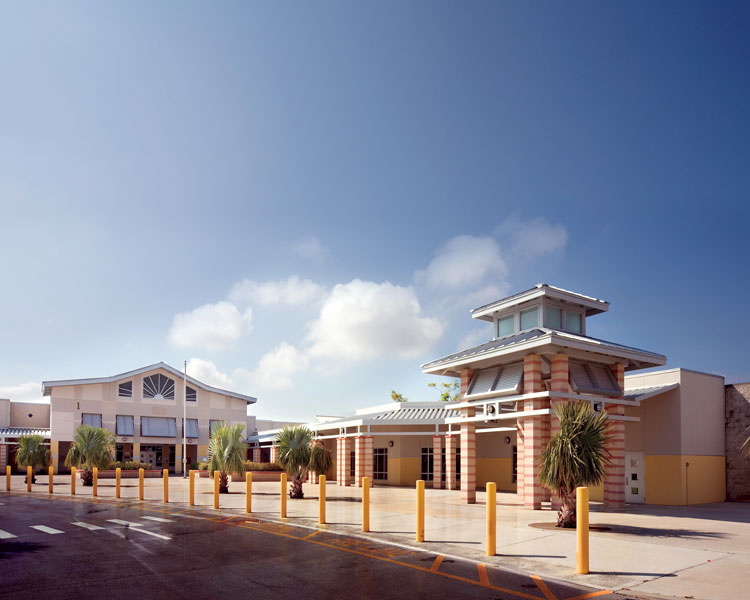
Boca Raton High School

As of 2007, Boca Raton was served by four public high schools. Within the city's limits, Boca Raton Community High School serves the eastern part of the city. Spanish River Community High School serves the west-central part of the city limits and parts of unincorporated Boca Raton. Olympic Heights Community High School and West Boca Raton Community High School serve the western unincorporated areas. Spanish River, Olympic Heights, and West Boca Raton also serve students from Delray Beach and Boynton Beach.

The area is served by five public middle schools. Don Estridge High Tech Middle School is a technology magnet school named for Don Estridge, the leader of a small group of engineers who developed the IBM Personal Computer in Boca Raton. The other four public middle schools are Boca Raton Community Middle School, Eagles Landing Middle School, Loggers' Run Community Middle School, and Omni Middle School.

The area is served by thirteen public elementary schools:

- Addison Mizner Elementary
- Blue Lake Elementary
- Boca Raton Elementary
- Calusa Elementary
- Coral Sunset Elementary
- Del Prado Elementary
- Hammock Pointe Elementary
- J.C. Mitchell Elementary
- Sandpiper Shores Elementary
- Sunrise Park Elementary
- Verde K-8
- Waters Edge Elementary
- Whispering Pines Elementary

=== Alternative schooling ===
Two alternatives to the Palm Beach County Public Schools in Boca Raton are the K–8 Alexander D. Henderson University School and FAU High School. Both are on the Florida Atlantic University campus and are organized as a unique and separate school district; they are not part of the Palm Beach County School System. Henderson School is recognized as Florida Atlantic University School District #72, under the College of Education's administrative oversight.

University schools in Florida are authorized to provide instruction for grades K–12 and university students, support university research efforts, and test educational reforms for Florida schools. Both ADHUS and FAUHS are public schools and thus do not charge tuition. And they are open to children who reside in Palm Beach County or Broward County. ADHUS admission is by lottery, while FAUHS admission is determined by academic ability. Student characteristics of gender, race, family income and student ability are used to match the student population profile to that of the state.

FAU High School is a dual-enrollment program that involves itself primarily in collegiate classes. Students in ninth grade take advanced classes at the ADHUS sister campus, while students in higher grades attend only collegiate classes on Florida Atlantic University's campus, earning dual credit for both high school and college. A student who has successfully completed all four years at FAU High School will graduate having completed three years of university study on a college campus.

=== Private schools ===
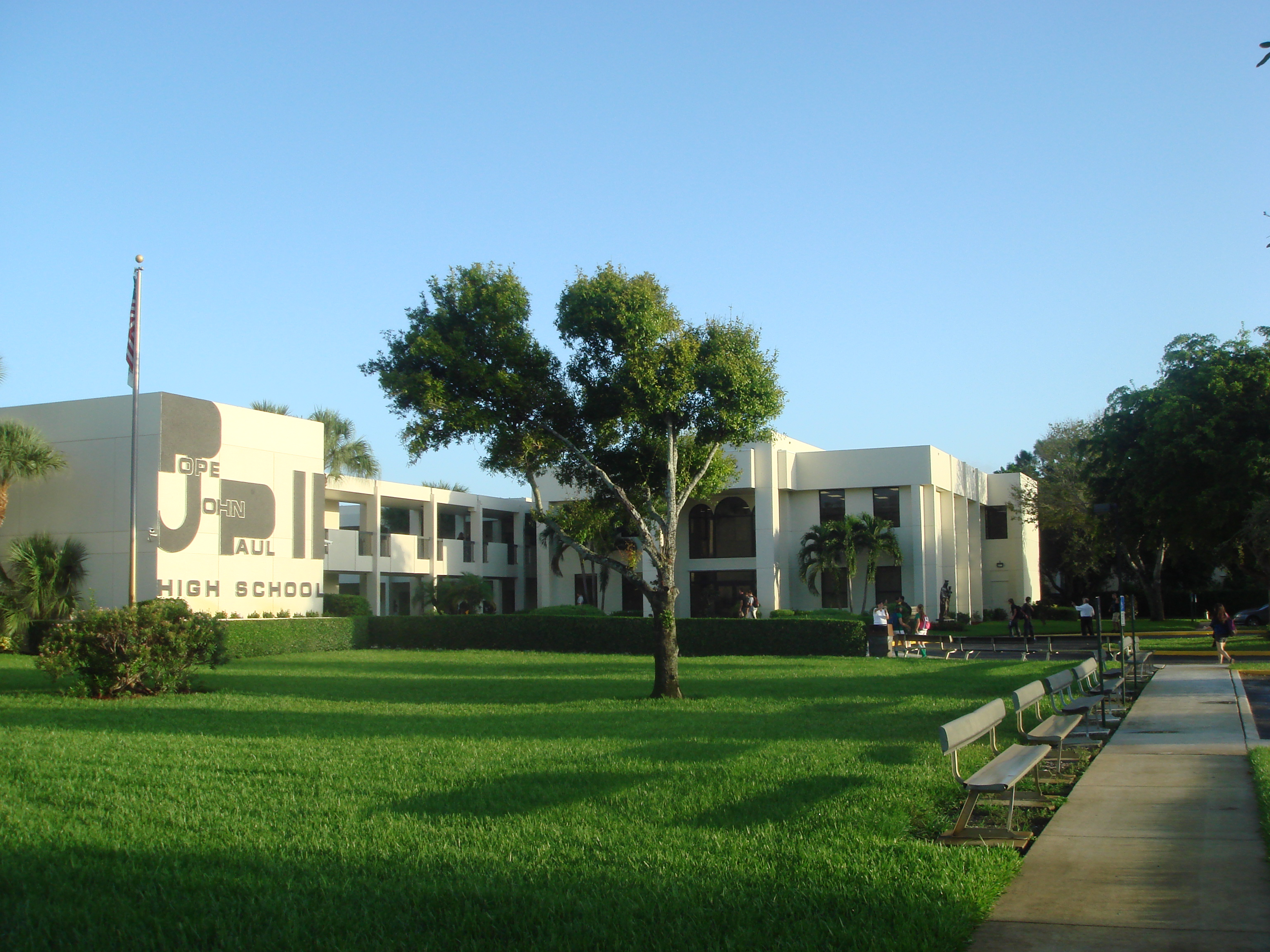
Saint John Paul II Academy is a Catholic school located in Boca Raton.

Private schools in Boca Raton accelerated in demand in the early 2020s as Wall Street moved many employees and offices to the South Florida area.

- American Heritage School
- Advent Lutheran School
- Boca Prep International School
- Boca Raton Christian School
- Boca School for Autism
- Donna Klein Jewish Academy
- Grandview Preparatory School
- Harid Conservatory
- Katz Hillel Day School
- Katz Yeshiva High School of Boca Raton
- Pine Crest School
- Saint Andrew's School
- Saint Joan of Arc Catholic School and Church
- Saint John Paul II Academy
- Saint Jude Catholic School and Parish
- Saint Paul Lutheran School
- Spanish River Christian
- Torah Academy of Boca Raton

=== Higher education ===
Florida Atlantic University (FAU), founded in 1961, held its first classes in Boca Raton in 1964. FAU is a member of the State University System of Florida and is the largest university in Boca Raton. It has over 29,000 students, 3,555 of which are residential students, and a Division I athletics program. In recognition of the rapid growth of Boca Raton's universities, in particular FAU, the city of Boca Raton has recently been referred to as a "burgeoning college town".

Lynn University is a four-year co-educational institution renamed to honor the Lynn (Eugene & Christine) family who continue to be benefactors of the university; its Digital Media Arts College, founded in 2001, offers bachelor's and master's degrees in computer animation and graphic design.

Palm Beach State College has its Boca Raton campus adjacent to Florida Atlantic University since 1983. When it was opened, it was named Palm Beach Junior College. In 1988 it changed its name to Palm Beach Community College, and in 2009, to Palm Beach State College.

Everglades University has its main campus in Boca Raton.

=== Libraries and newspaper ===
The Boca Raton Public Library serves city of Boca Raton residents. The Glades Road Branch Library and the West Boca Branch Library of the Palm Beach County Library System additionally serve Boca Raton residents who live outside the city limits in West Boca Raton. County library card holders may use any of the sixteen branches in the Palm Beach County Library System and have access to many databases and downloadable e-books and audio books.

The Sun-Sentinel newspaper delivers local news to the area. Previously, the Boca Raton News was a local newspaper for the town.

== Politics ==
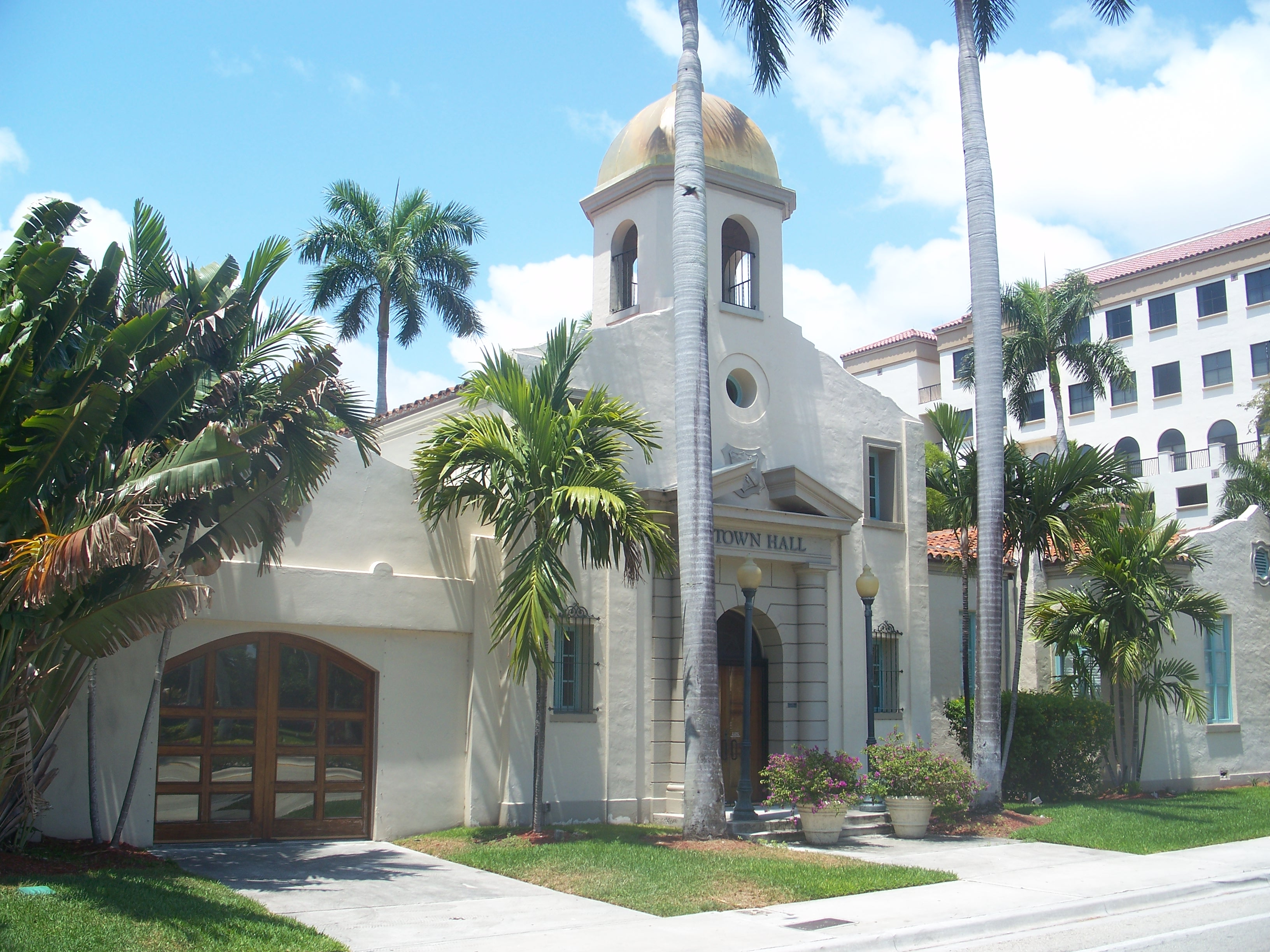
Boca Raton old Town Hall, built in 1927

List of mayors of Boca Raton, Florida
- George Long, 1924–1925
- John Brown, 1925–1929
- Fred Aiken, 1929–1938
- Joe Mitchell, 1938–1950
- Bill O'Donnell, 1950–1951
- Louie Zimmerman, 1951–1952
- Bill Day, 1952–1953, 1954–1954
- Harold Turner, 1953–1954, 1954–1955
- Bill Herbold, 1955–1956
- Roy Shores, 1956–1958
- Hal Dane, 1958–1959
- Joe Delong, 1959–1960, 1963–1964
- Courtney Boone, 1960–1961
- Leo Fox, 1961–1962
- John Brandt, 1962–1963
- Harold Maull, 1964–1965, 1968–1969
- Pat Honchell, 1966–1967
- Nardy Turner, 1967–1968
- Emil Danciu, 1969–1970, 1987–1993
- Tore Wallin, 1970–1971
- Norm Wymbs, 1971
- Bill Miller, 1971–1972
- Byrd Marshall, 1972–1973, 1975–1976, 1978
- Al Alford, 1973–1974
- Dick Houpana, 1974–1975, 1977
- Byrd Marshall, 1972–1973, 1975–1976, 1978
- Dorothy Wilken, 1976–1977
- Jeff Milner, 1977–1981
- Bill Konrad, 1981–1987
- Bill Smith, 1993–1995
- Carol Hanson, 1995–2001
- Steven L. Abrams, 2001–2008
- Susan Whelchel, 2008–2014
- Susan Haynie, 2014–2018
- Scott Singer, 2018–2026
- Andy Thomson, 2026-present

The City of Boca Raton has a Council-Manager form of government. The Mayor has been chosen through a direct election since 1978. The offices of the city council and the mayor are nonpartisan. The previous mayor was Susan Haynie. On April 27, 2018, Governor Rick Scott suspended Susan Haynie due to felony and misdemeanor charges brought against her for corruption and bribery. She would later plead guilty to two of the counts, avoiding jail time. Scott Singer was appointed mayor and held that position on that basis until the August 28 special election; Scott Singer was elected outright as mayor in that election.

As of January 2023, Democrat Jared Moskowitz represents Florida's 23rd Congressional District, which includes the most northern point of Boca Raton and extends south through Palm Beach County. The district then continues into Broward County communities like Coral Springs, Parkland, and Margate, down to Fort Lauderdale.

In the 2016 and 2020 presidential elections, Republican Donald Trump won in Boca Raton by a plurality. In the 2024 United States presidential election, Trump received 30,159 votes and Harris received 23,401 votes; 86% of eligible voters in Boca Raton participated.

In 2026, Democrat Andy Thomson won the mayoral election by just five votes.

== Crime ==
The City of Boca Raton is one of the safest cities in Palm Beach County, with a crime rate 38% lower than the entire state of Florida.

Boca Raton has been mentioned in connection with organized crime activities. According to a number of US Federal indictments, as of June 2004, the Gambino family was reported to be operating in Boca Raton. The television show The Sopranos featured the city in its plot, including the episodes "Boca" and "...To Save Us All From Satan's Power", and Mafia Wife author Lynda Milito resides in Boca Raton. Joey Merlino, the reputed head of the Philadelphia crime family, also resides in northern Boca Raton.

In 2007, several murders at the Town Center Mall gained national attention. In March, a 52-year-old woman was kidnapped and murdered. In December 2007, a 47-year-old woman and her 7-year-old daughter were also kidnapped and later found bound and shot in the head in the woman's SUV in the mall parking lot. This case was featured on America's Most Wanted. Though there is no forensic evidence to suggest the murders were committed by the same person, the similarities in the cases led police to believe they were related. To this day, the murders all remain unsolved.

The Pearl City neighborhood has been known as a drug trafficking hub in the past. In recent years, the city, like most of the county (especially neighboring Delray Beach) has experienced a steady rise in heroin and opioid overdoses.

As of the end of 2019, the crime rate in Boca Raton was down 26% over the preceding 13 years.

== Transportation ==
=== Air ===
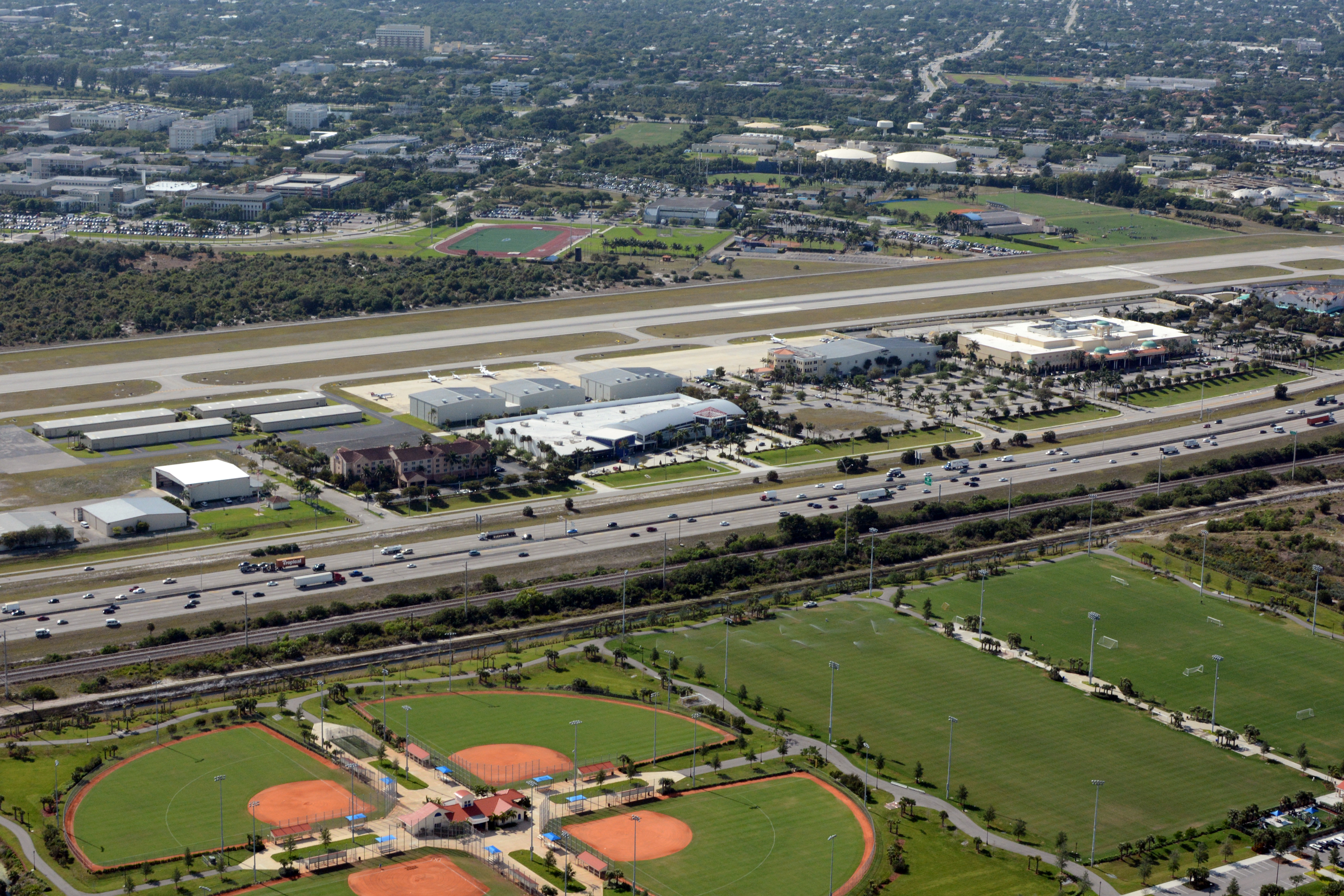
Boca Raton Airport

The Boca Raton Airport (BCT) is a general aviation airport immediately adjacent to Florida Atlantic University and Interstate 95. It has a control tower which is staffed from 0700 to 2300. The Boca Raton Airport is publicly owned and governed by a seven-member Authority appointed by the City of Boca Raton and the Palm Beach County Commission. The airport is noted for a very high concentration of private jets and charter aviation, and the airspace surrounding the airport is in Class D airspace.

All three of the Miami area's major commercial airports serve Boca Raton, though the city is located about equidistantly between Fort Lauderdale-Hollywood International Airport and President Donald J. Trump International Airport. Most commercial international flights to the region will pass through Miami International Airport, which can be accessed via I-95 and Florida State Route 112 by road or by using Tri-Rail.

=== Highways ===
- State Road A1A is a north–south road lying between the Intracoastal Waterway and the Atlantic Ocean.
- U.S. Highway 1, locally known as "Federal Highway", is a north–south highway passing through the city's downtown, commercial, and industrial districts in the eastern part of the city.
- U.S. Highway 441 (also known as State Road 7) is a north–south highway passing through commercial and residential districts west of the city limits.
- I-95 bisects the city from north to south with four interchanges serving Boca Raton.
- Florida's Turnpike is a north–south highway passing through unincorporated Boca Raton, forming part of the city limits in the north, with one interchange at Glades Road.
- Glades Road is an east–west road between US 441 and US 1.
- Other major east–west roads include Palmetto Park Road and Yamato Road.
- Other major north–south roads include Military Trail and Jog Road / Powerline Road (Changes name on Glades Road).

=== Bus ===
- PalmTran provides local bus service in the area.

=== Rail ===
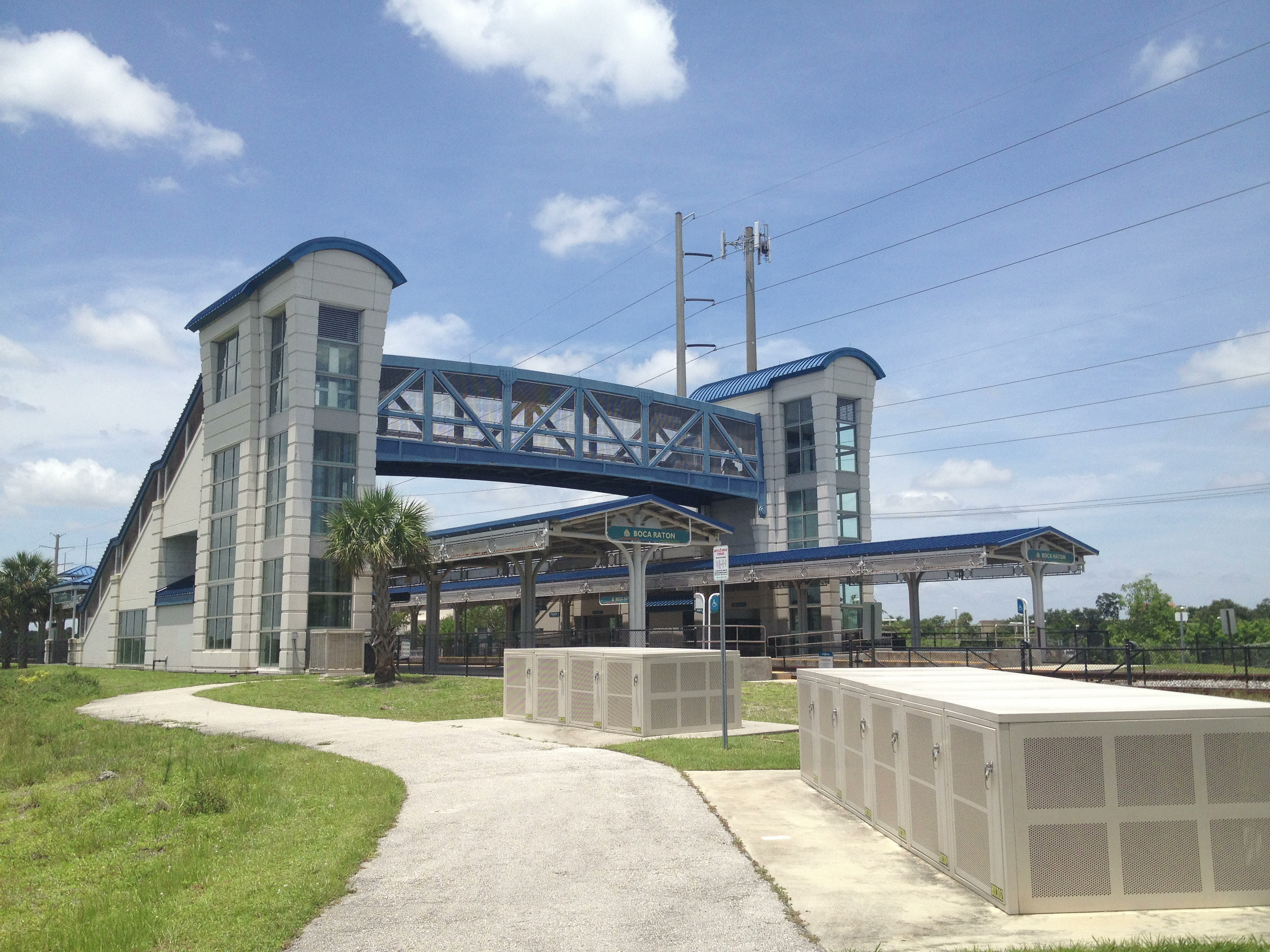
Boca Raton Tri-Rail station

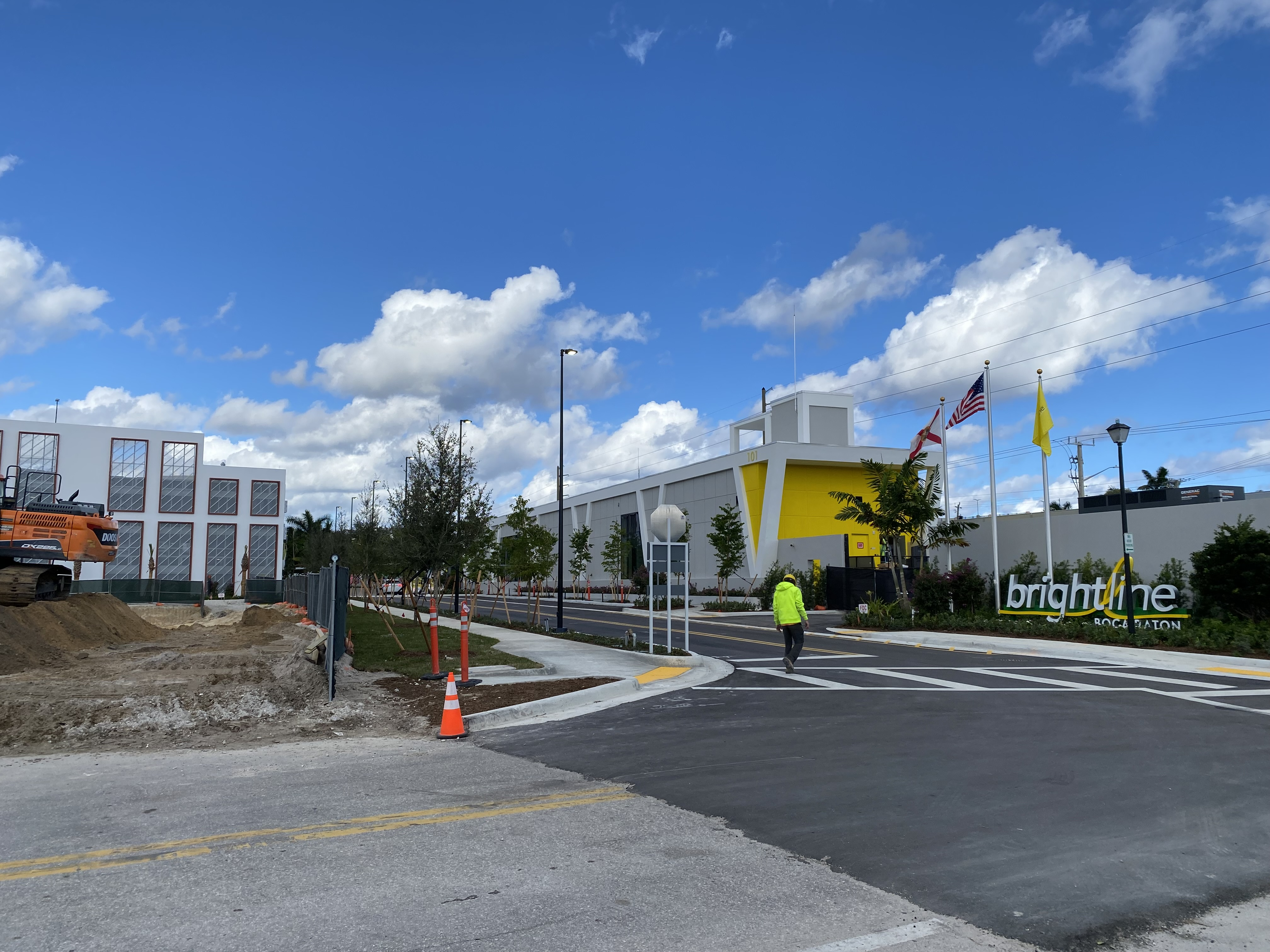
Boca Raton Brightline station

Passenger

- The Tri-Rail commuter rail system serves the city with its Boca Raton station on the south side of Yamato Road just west of I-95.
- Brightline has a station adjacent to the Boca Raton Public Library. It provides service to Miami, Fort Lauderdale, West Palm Beach, and Aventura, as well as Orlando.

Freight

- Freight service operated by CSX Transportation and Florida East Coast Railway also serve the city.

=== Water ===
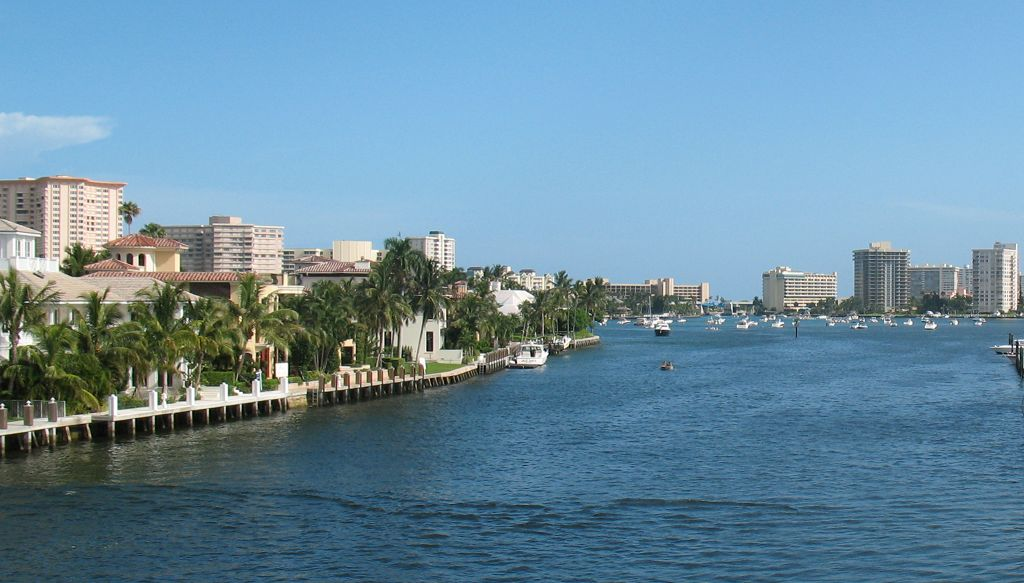
Lake Boca Raton

Long before any settlers arrived, the original 1870 government survey of the area showed that just west of and parallel to the Atlantic Ocean's coastal dune was the "Boca Ratones Lagoon", which extended south for nine miles (14 km) measured from just north of the present location of Atlantic Avenue in Delray Beach. Along the southern half of the lagoon were three wide areas each called a "Lake", which are now named (north to south) Lake Rogers, Lake Wyman, and Lake Boca Raton. At the southeast end of the lagoon was a short protrusion toward the south which would become the Boca Raton Inlet after a sandbar at its mouth was removed.

The lagoon and lakes were part of a half-mile (0.8 km) wide swamp, west of which was scrub land a mile (1.6 km) wide (part of the Atlantic Coastal Ridge) where the Florida East Coast Railway (1896) and Dixie Highway (1923) were built. To the west of the scrub was a half mile or wider swamp within which flowed north to south the "Prong of Hillsborough River", which is now the El Rio Canal. It now forms the eastern border of Florida Atlantic University and the Old Floresta neighborhood. The prong entered the "Hillsborough River" at the present eastern end of the straight portion of the Hillsboro Canal (dredged 1911–1914), which is the southern city limits. The river flowed southeast in several channels along the western edge of the present Deerfield Island County Park, formerly called Capone Island (named for Al Capone who owned it during the 1930s), which did not become an island until the Royal Palm Canal was dredged along its northern edge in 1961. Flowing south from the lagoon to the river along the eastern edge of the 'island' was a "Small boat Pass into Hillsboro' River", also called the Little Hillsboro. The river continued due south about four and a half miles (7.2 km) just inland of the coastal dune until it emptied into the Atlantic Ocean at the "Hillsborough Bar", now the Hillsboro Inlet.

The lagoon was dredged in 1894–1895 to form part of the Florida East Coast Canal with a minimum depth of 5 feet (1.5 m) and a minimum width of 50 feet (15 m). After 1895, the lagoon and canal were sometimes called the Spanish River. Between 1930 and 1935 the canal was improved to 8 by 100 feet (2.4 by 30.5 meters) by the federal government and renamed the Intracoastal Waterway. It was improved again between 1960 and 1965 to 10 by 125 feet (3.0 by 38.1 meters). All three versions were subject to shoaling which reduced their depths below the specified minimum. Forming part of the northern city limits is the C-15 canal, connecting the El Rio Canal to the Intracoastal Waterway.

Boca Raton pioneered an innovative means of recycling nutrient laden wastewater, reducing Boca Raton's impact on the problem of toxic algae blooms. Instead of pumping it out to sea, or under the ground into an aquifer, the IRIS system sells recycled water to golf courses to use for irrigation.

== See also ==
- List of people from Boca Raton
