= National Council on Compensation Insurance =

U.S. insurance and data collection organization

The National Council on Compensation Insurance (NCCI) is an organization in the United States that collects and analyzes workers’ compensation insurance data. It provides rate recommendations, evaluates legislative proposals, and supports the administration of state workers’ compensation systems. The U.S. Department of Labor describes NCCI as managing the nation’s largest database of workers’ compensation insurance information.

NCCI also produces manuals used in many states to help determine workers’ compensation insurance premiums, including the Basic Manual, Experience Rating Manual, and the Scopes Manual. It calculates experience modification factors using employer loss and payroll data reported by insurers in the states where it operates.

Headquartered in Boca Raton, Florida, the organization is overseen by a board of directors representing affiliated insurers and other stakeholders.

== History ==
In 2024, the NCCI recommended reductions in workers’ compensation premium rates across multiple U.S. states. These recommendations reflected broader national trends, including reduced claims severity, improved workplace safety through automation, better hiring practices, strategies to return injured employees to work, and increased investment in employer safety programs. One such filing, in Connecticut, was approved by the state’s insurance regulator and reported by Reuters as part of wider industry developments.

In May 2025, Insurance Journal reported that the NCCI attributed cost management in the workers’ compensation system to medical fee schedules and data-driven decision-making. NCCI stated that combined ratios have remained below 100 due to three primary trends: continued long-term declines in frequency, moderate severity, and growing wages.

In its "2025 State of the Line" report, the NCCI stated that U.S. workers’ compensation net premium fell by 3 percent in 2024, with a combined ratio of 86, the same as in 2023. As reported by Insurance Journal, 2024 also saw a 5 percent decline in lost-time claim frequency, while medical and indemnity claim severity each increased by 6 percent. The report noted that although overall claim frequency has declined in recent years, industry-specific patterns vary; for example, the private education sector saw an increase in injuries categorized as “struck or injured by”.
