= Pearl City (Boca Raton) =

Neighborhood in Boca Raton, Florida

Coordinates: 26.360556°N 80.084686°W

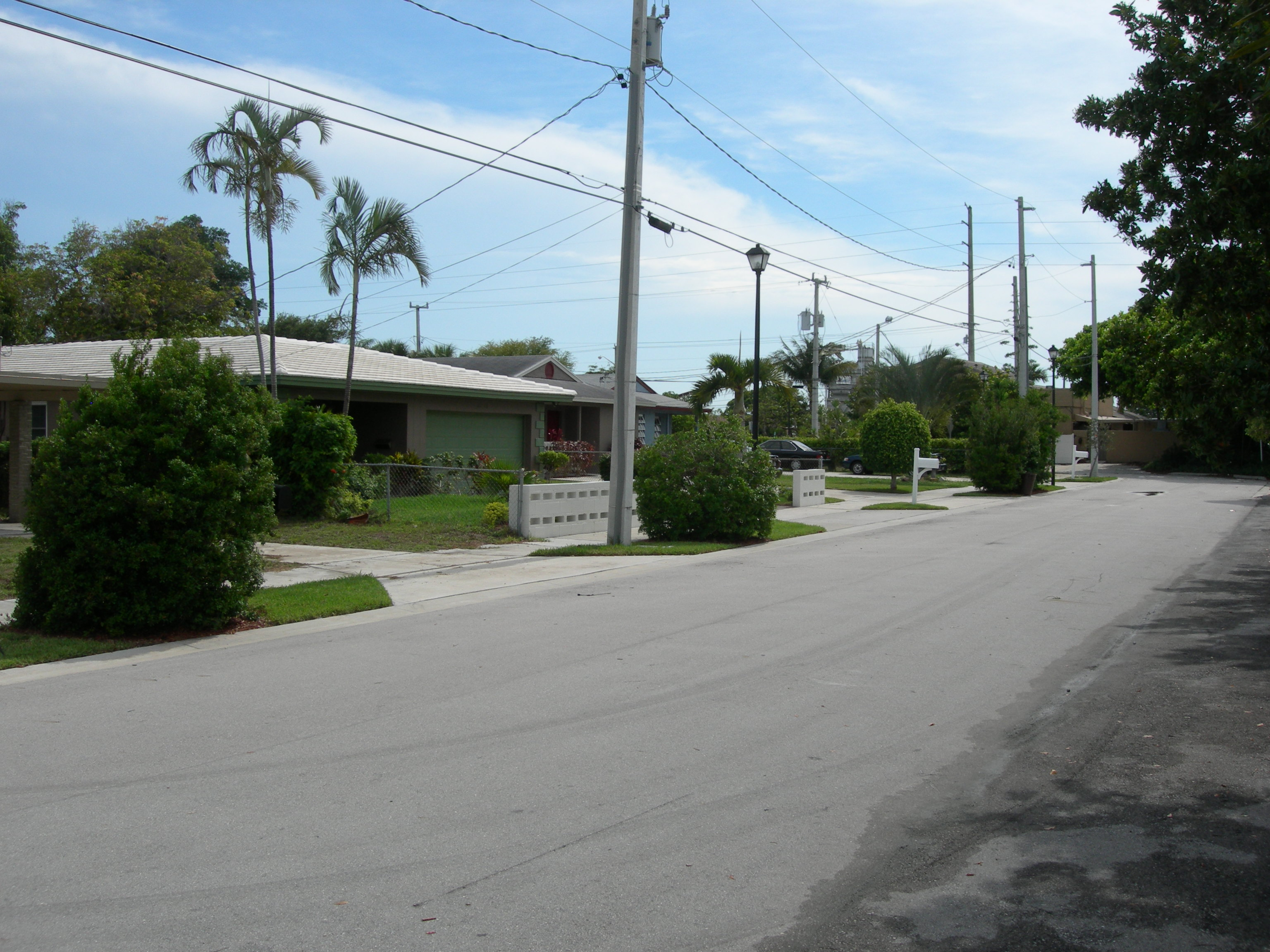
Residential street in Pearl City

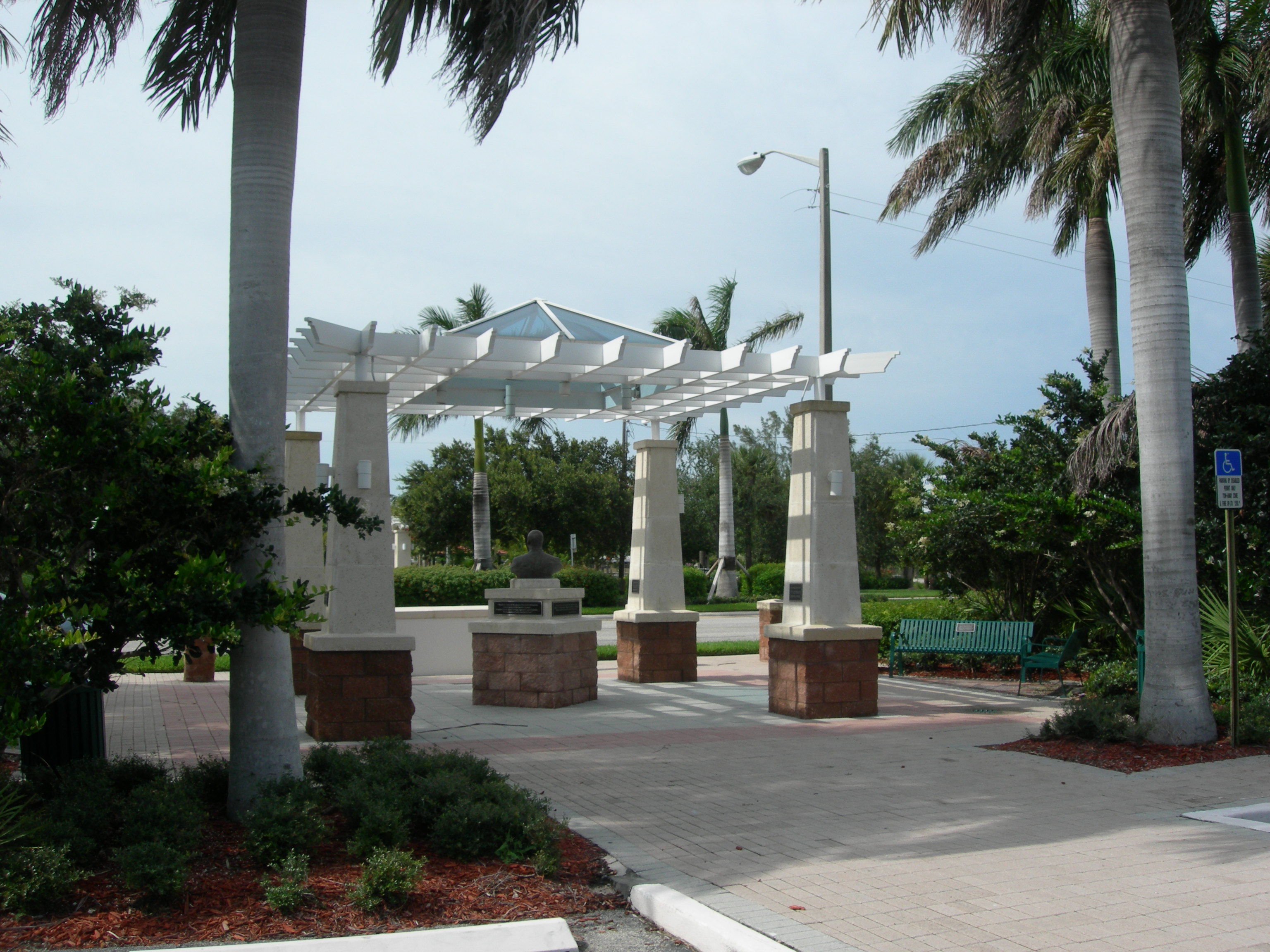
Dr. Martin Luther King Jr. Memorial

Pearl City is a historic African-American neighborhood, and the oldest community, in Boca Raton, Florida. The establishment of Pearl City predates the official incorporation of Boca Raton. In December 2023, Pearl City was added to National Register of Historic Places by the National Park Service. The neighborhood's name is thought to be derived from the Hawaiian Pearl, a variety of pineapple grown in the Boca Raton area at the time of Pearl City's inception. Pearl City is located directly south of Glades Road between Dixie Highway and Federal Highway in Boca Raton. During segregation, Pearl City developed a rich social, economic and cultural life which persists today.

== History ==
=== Early history ===
According to sociological documentation in the form of voice recordings of early Pearl City residents, the majority of Black individuals that migrated to South Florida were predominantly from either the Bahamian archipelago or from southern states such as Georgia, Alabama, and South Carolina. Around 1911, only a small number of African American families had migrated south to the Boca Raton area from other established areas such as Boynton Beach, Delray Beach and Lake Worth to find more adequate economic conditions. The area directly south of Boca Raton, Deerfield Beach, had an established African American community at this point in time.

Influential developers such as Thomas Rickards, Frank H. Chesebro, and George A. Long, and associate of Henry Flagler, established the economic and agriculture infrastructure in the Boca Raton area that would serve as the basis for the development of Pearl City. When Rickards, Chesebro and Long established their businesses in Boca Raton, they employed laborers from Deerfield Beach and Delray Beach at the newly established farms in Boca Raton.

Pearl City was established in 1915 as a community for those agricultural workers in Boca Raton who lived in Deerfield Beach approximately 5 miles away. The community was initially proposed by George Long so workers would not have to travel back and forth from Deerfield Beach to Boca Raton on a daily basis. Eventually, small parcels of land began to be offered for a minimum downpayment of $5. The parcels offered were smaller and more expensive than those offered to white families. One of the earliest residents of Pearl City, Alex Hughes, purchased one of the first lots in Pearl City for $25, $10 down payment where he built his home.

In 1920, Hughes addressed the Board of Public Education in West Palm Beach for the establishment of a school for Black children in Pearl City. After recruiting eight school children, the Board of Public Education provided a teacher for the school. The school building itself was a former White school that was moved from its original location west of the FEC railroad tracks near Palmetto Park Road to its new site on Dixie Highway and Eleventh Street. The move took a total of eighteen days.

During the 1930s and into the 1950s, most residents of Pearl City were employed at August Butts' green bean farms, which encompassed what is now referred to as West Boca. During this time, the residents experienced a regular lack of running water and electricity.

== Revitalization ==
The neighborhood was designated a historic district by the decree of the Boca Raton City Council in 2002 and in 2023 Pearl City was added to the National Register of Historic Places by the National Park Service. In recent years there has been aesthetic improvements to the neighborhood including street resurfacing projects.

A Dr. Martin Luther King Jr. Memorial was dedicated in 2001. The memorial is set in a small park on the grounds of Ebenezer Baptist Church, at the northeast corner of the Pearl City neighborhood.
