= Deerfield Beach, Florida =

Deerfield Beach
- City
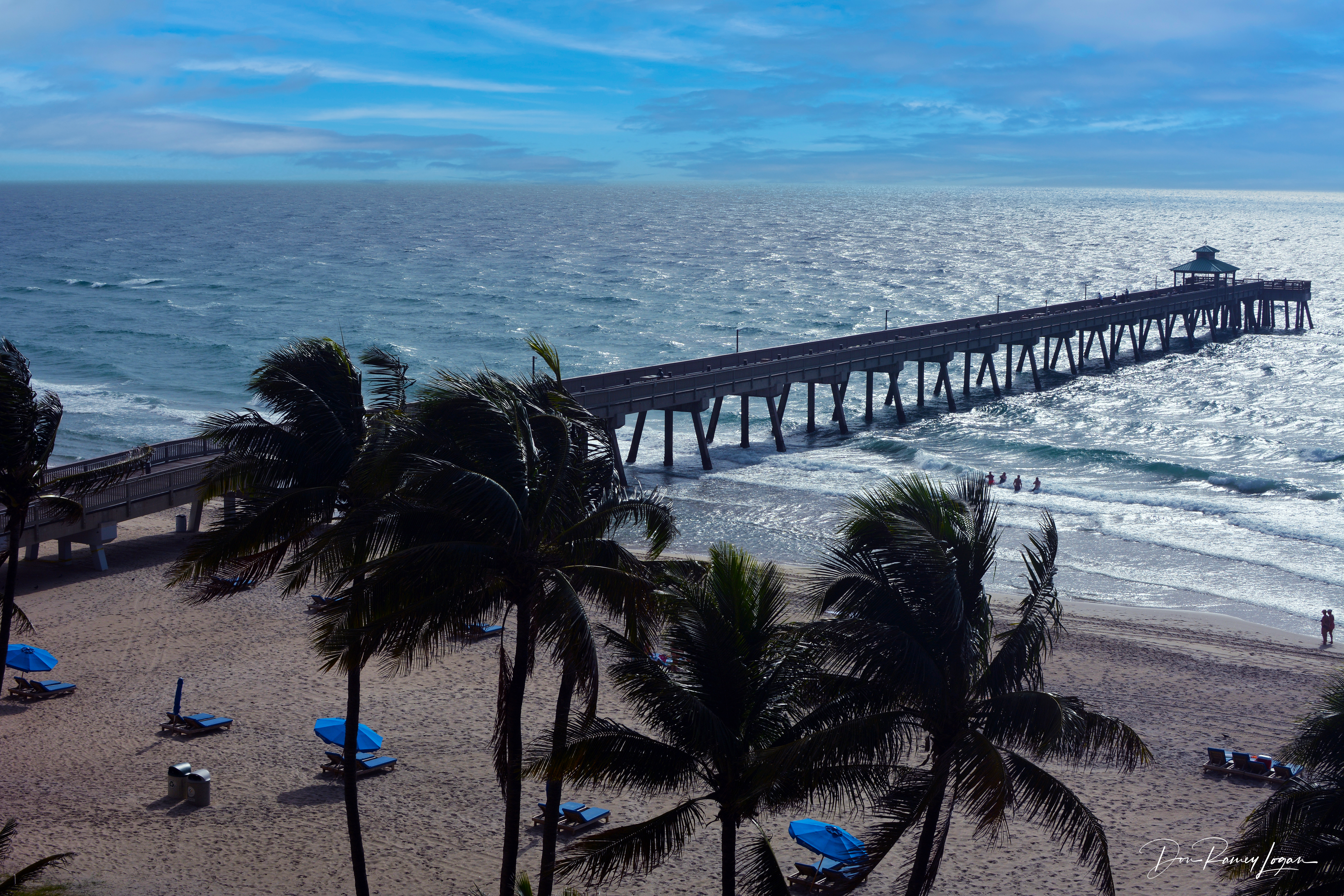
- Deerfield Beach with pier in background

- Seal

- Location within the state of Florida
- Coordinates: 26°18′22″N 80°07′08″W
- Country: United States
- State: Florida
- County: Broward
- Incorporated as Deerfield (town): June 11, 1925
- Incorporated as Deerfield Beach (town): May 12, 1939
- Incorporated as Deerfield Beach (city): June 13, 1945

Government
  - Type: Mayor–council

Area
  - Total: 16.22 sq mi (42.01 km^{2})
  - Land: 14.95 sq mi (38.71 km^{2})
  - Water: 1.27 sq mi (3.30 km^{2}) 7.12%
- Elevation: 13 ft (4.0 m)

Population (2020)
  - Total: 86,859
  - Estimate (2024): 90,507
  - Rank: 201st in the United States; 14th in Florida
  - Density: 5,805.7/sq mi (2,241.59/km^{2})
- Time zone: UTC−5 (EST)
  - Summer (DST): UTC−4 (EDT)
- ZIP Codes: 33441–33443, 33064, 33073
- Area codes: 754, 954
- FIPS code: 12-16725
- GNIS feature ID: 2404210
- Website: www.deerfield-beach.com

Deerfield Beach is a city in Broward County, Florida, United States. Located 40 miles (64 km) north of Miami, it is a principal city in the Miami metropolitan area in South Florida, which was home to 6.14 million people in 2020. As of the 2020 census, its population was 86,859, making it the 10th-largest city in Broward County and the 13th-largest city in the Miami metropolitan area. The Hillsboro River and the city of Boca Raton border the city to the north, the Atlantic Ocean to the east, Coconut Creek to the west, and Pompano Beach to the south.

The city's contemporary history dates back to the late 19th century, with the construction of the Florida East Coast Railway in 1896, built by Henry Flagler. The city's first post office was established in 1898. On June 11, 1925, the city was incorporated as the Town of Deerfield. The city grew very rapidly in the mid-20th century, particularly between 1950 and 1980, as new neighborhoods were built. The city has continued to grow since, and as of 2024, it has an estimated population of 90,507.

The city is known for its beaches and pier on Deerfield Beach Island, as well as its parks, particularly the botanical gardens of the Deerfield Beach Arboretum and Quiet Waters Park.

== History ==
Deerfield Beach's history dates to 1890, when a small settlement named Hillsborough was developed along the Hillsboro River. As the population grew to 20 by 1898, the settlement was served by its own post office, and the town was named Deerfield for the deer that grazed along the river.

By the early 20th century, as the town's population continued to grow, the Florida East Coast Railroad constructed tracks en route to Miami, bisecting Deerfield. Deerfield's early settlers were mostly farmers who grew pineapples, tomatoes, green beans, and squash, and fished along the Intracoastal Waterway. Deerfield remained a largely agricultural community, but in 1939, the town's name was changed to Deerfield Beach to let tourists know it has a beach. In 1952, the original Deerfield Beach Pier was built of wood.

Many of the city's oldest structures, mostly built in the 1920s, are built in a Spanish Mediterranean Revival style, a traditionally popular architectural style in South Florida.

== Geography ==
According to the United States Census Bureau, the city has a total area of 16.3 square miles (42.1 km^{2}), of which 1.2 square miles (3.0 km^{2}) are covered by water (7.12%). Of Deerfield Beach's land mass, 0.3 square mile is located on Deerfield Beach Island

=== Climate ===
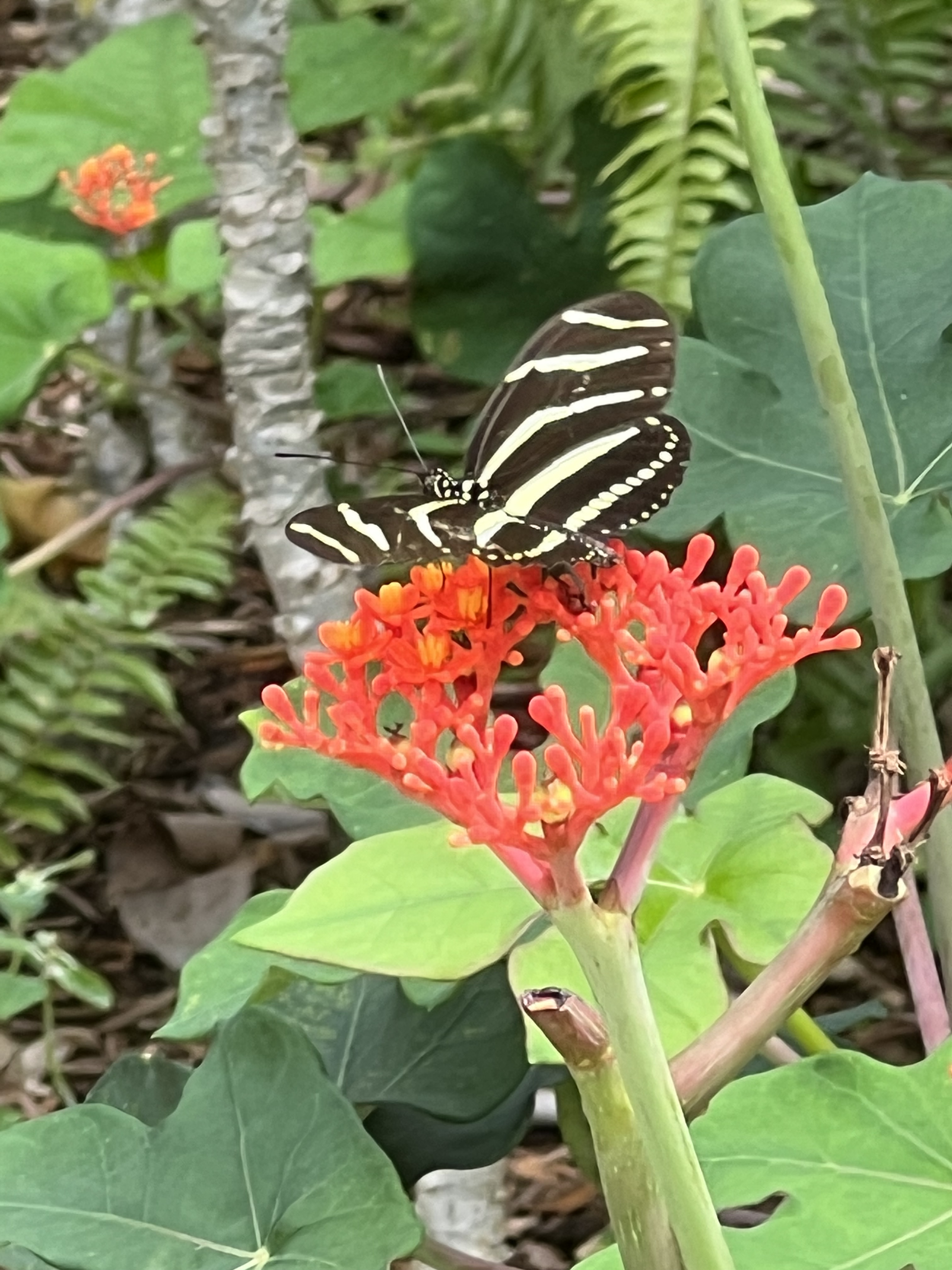
Deerfield Beach's tropical rainforest climate and tropical monsoon climate provides for an adequate habitat for a diversity of tropical plants and animals, as shown in the Deerfield Beach Arboretum.

Deerfield Beach has a borderline tropical rainforest climate (Köppen climate classification: Af), bordering on a tropical monsoon climate (Köppen Am), featuring hot summer days, frequent thunderstorms in the summer, and less frequent rain in the fall.

During the summer, average temperatures generally are in the 80s, while during the winter, they are in the 60s. July is generally the warmest month of the year, with an average maximum temperature of 92 °F (33.3 °C), while the coldest month of the year is February, with an average minimum temperature of 58 °F (14.4 °C). The all-time record high is 101 °F (38.3 °C) recorded in 1981, while the all-time record low is 21 °F (−6.1 °C) which was recorded in 1995. The year-round average temperature is 77 °F (25.0 °C).

The annual average precipitation at Deerfield Beach is 57.27 inches (1,455 mm). Summers tend to be wetter than winters. The wettest month of the year is June, with an average rainfall of 7.3 inches (190 mm).

Deerfield Beach falls under the USDA 10b Plant hardiness zone.

Climate data for Deerfield Beach, FL
Month	Jan	Feb	Mar	Apr	May	Jun	Jul	Aug	Sep	Oct	Nov	Dec	Year
Record high °F (°C)	90 (32)	90 (32)	92 (33)	100 (38)	99 (37)	100 (38)	101 (38)	99 (37)	99 (37)	97 (36)	96 (36)	89 (32)	101 (38)
Mean daily maximum °F (°C)	76 (24)	77 (25)	80 (27)	83 (28)	87 (31)	90 (32)	92 (33)	92 (33)	91 (33)	87 (31)	82 (28)	78 (26)	85 (29)
Mean daily minimum °F (°C)	58 (14)	58 (14)	62 (17)	66 (19)	71 (22)	74 (23)	75 (24)	75 (24)	74 (23)	71 (22)	66 (19)	61 (16)	68 (20)
Record low °F (°C)	25 (−4)	21 (−6)	32 (0)	40 (4)	50 (10)	40 (4)	53 (12)	59 (15)	57 (14)	44 (7)	35 (2)	28 (−2)	21 (−6)
Average precipitation inches (mm)	2.78 (71)	2.85 (72)	3.0 (76)	3.4 (86)	5.73 (146)	7.31 (186)	5.94 (151)	6.91 (176)	7.01 (178)	5.73 (146)	4.24 (108)	2.46 (62)	57.36 (1,457)
Source: Weather.com

Climate data for Deerfield Beach
Month	Jan	Feb	Mar	Apr	May	Jun	Jul	Aug	Sep	Oct	Nov	Dec	Year
Mean daily daylight hours	10.5	11.5	12.0	12.5	13.5	13.5	13.5	13.0	12.5	11.5	11.0	10.5	12.1
Source: Weather Atlas

== Demographics ==
Historical population
Census	Pop.	Note	%±
1930	1,483		—
1940	1,850		24.7%
1950	2,088		12.9%
1960	9,573		358.5%
1970	16,662		74.1%
1980	39,193		135.2%
1990	46,325		18.2%
2000	64,583		39.4%
2010	75,018		16.2%
2020	86,859		15.8%
2024 (est.)	90,507	▲	4.2%
U.S. Decennial Census; 1930–1970 1980 1990; 2000 2010 2020 2024

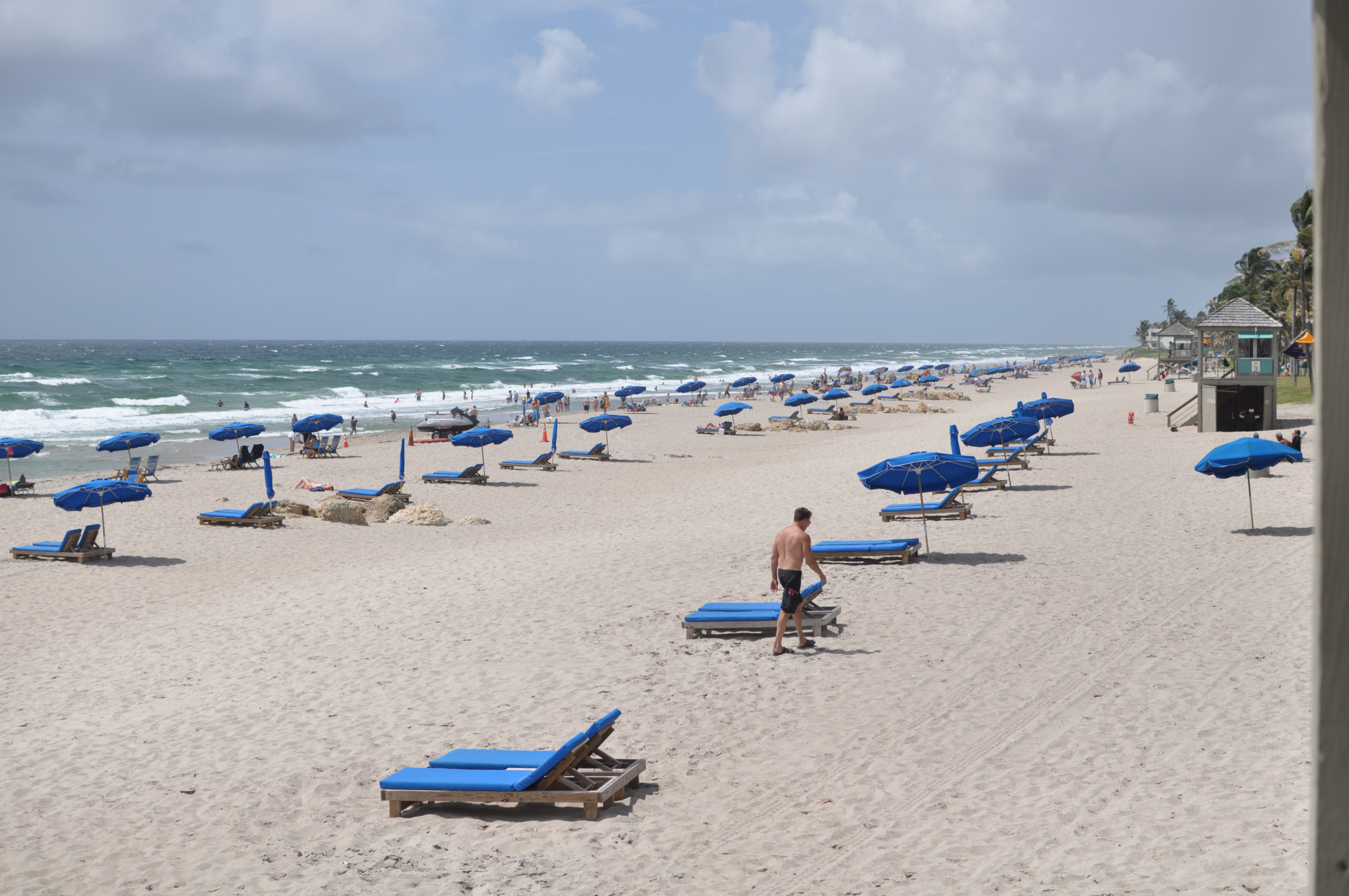
Deerfield Beach

=== Racial and ethnic composition ===
Historical racial composition	2020	2010	2000	1990	1980
White (non-Hispanic)	41.7%	56.0%	71.2%	78.9%	80.4%
Hispanic or Latino	20.2%	14.2%	8.7%	3.9%	2.1%
Black or African American (non-Hispanic)	24.4%	25.0%	15.7%	16.2%	17.1%
Asian and Pacific Islander (non-Hispanic)	1.9%	1.5%	1.4%	0.8%	0.4%
Native American (non-Hispanic)	0.1%	0.1%	0.1%	0.1%	0.4%
Some other race (non-Hispanic)	3.3%	1.4%	0.7%	0.1%	0.4%
Two or more races (non-Hispanic)	8.3%	1.9%	2.1%	N/A	N/A
Population	86,859	75,018	64,583	46,325	39,193

=== 2020 census ===
As of the 2020 census, Deerfield Beach had a population of 86,859. The median age was 43.7 years; 17.7% of residents were under 18, 60.8% were between 18 and 64, and 21.6% were 65 or older. For every 100 females, there were 93.5 males, and for every 100 females 18 and over, there were 91.5 males 18 and over.

All of the residents lived in urban areas, while none lived in rural areas.

Of the 37,858 households in Deerfield Beach, 23.1% had children under 18 living in them, 36.0% were married-couple households, 23.3% were households with a male householder and no spouse or partner present, and 33.8% were households with a female householder and no spouse or partner present. About 35.8% of all households were made up of individuals, 17.0% had someone living alone who was 65 years of age or older, and the average household size was 1.85.

The city had 46,993 housing units, of which 19.4% were vacant. The homeowner vacancy rate was 2.1% and the rental vacancy rate was 7.0%.

Racial composition as of the 2020 census
Race	Number	Percentage
White	39,945	46.0%
Black or African American	21,642	24.9%
American Indian and Alaska Native	282	0.3%
Asian	1,666	1.9%
Native Hawaiian and other Pacific Islander	41	0.0%
Some other race	8,466	9.7%
Two or more races	14,817	17.1%
Hispanic or Latino (of any race)	17,568	20.2%

=== Other demographics ===
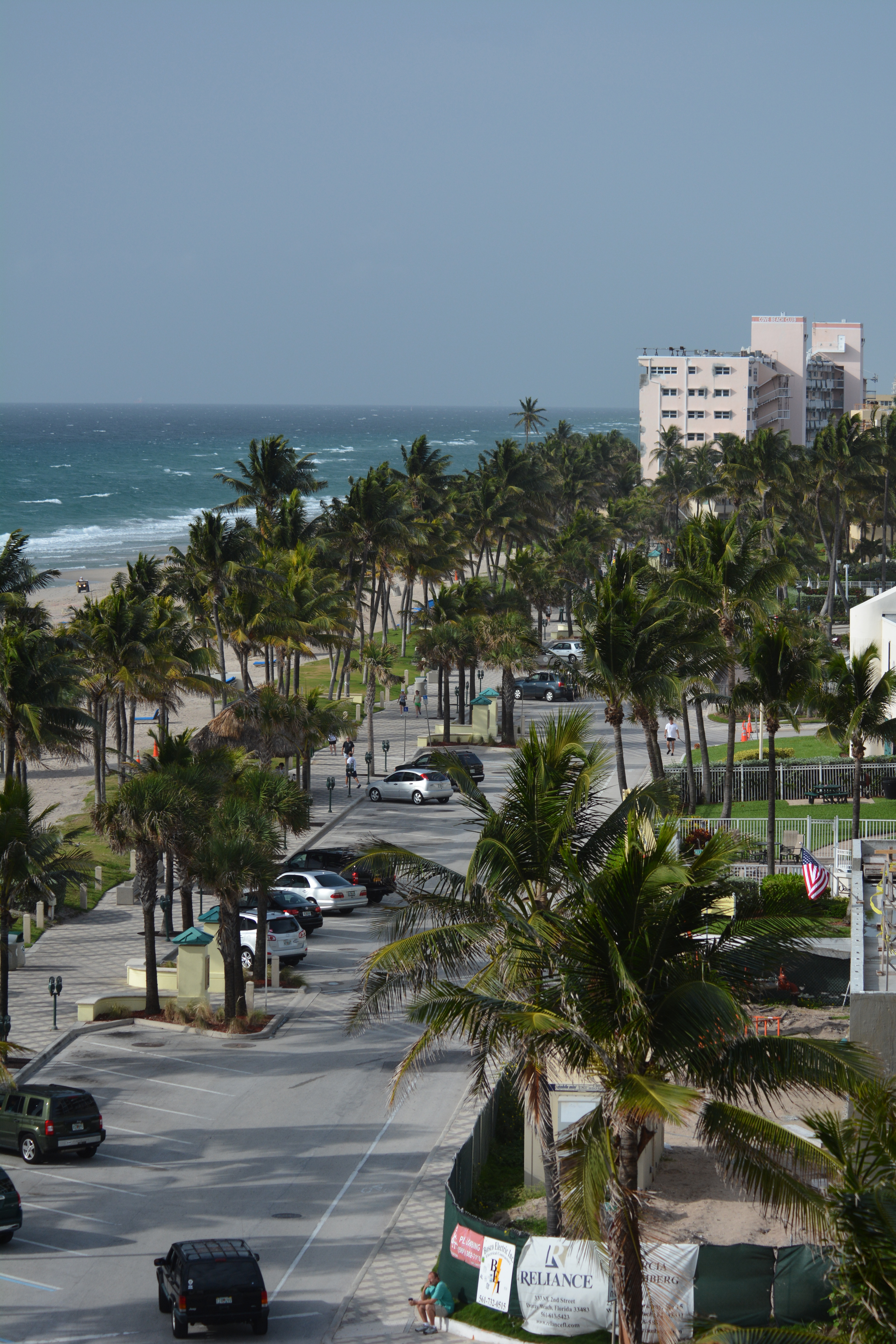
Palm trees along Deerfield Beach

Demographic characteristics	2020	2010	2000	1990	1980
Housing units	46,993	42,671	37,343	23,118	18,422
Persons per household	1.85	1.76	1.73	2.00	2.13
Sex Ratio	93.5	93.4	87.2	83.2	81.8
Ages 0–17	17.7%	18.0%	15.6%	13.6%	14.6%
Ages 18–64	60.8%	60.6%	55.1%	50.1%	44.2%
Ages 65 +	21.6%	21.5%	29.3%	36.3%	41.3%
Median age	43.7	43.3	44.6	48.6	60.6
Population	86,859	75,018	64,583	46,325	39,193

Economic indicators
2017–21 American Community Survey	Deerfield Beach	Broward County	Florida
Median income	$31,343	$36,222	$34,367
Median household income	$49,650	$64,522	$61,777
Poverty Rate	15.6%	12.4%	13.1%
High school diploma	85.4%	90.0%	89.0%
Bachelor's degree	26.9%	34.3%	31.5%
Advanced degree	9.0%	13.1%	11.7%

Language spoken at home (Note: Language spoken at home among residents at least five years old; only languages (or language groups) which at least 2% of residents have spoken at any time since 1980 are mentioned)	2015 (Note: Refers to 2013–2017 American Community Survey data; the last Decennial Census where language data was collected was in the 2000 census)	2010 (Note: Refers to 2008–2012 American Community Survey data; the last Decennial Census where language data was collected was in the 2000 census)	2000	1990	1980
English	57.8%	59.3%	74.7%	85.3%	87.7%
Spanish or Spanish Creole	14.6%	12.6%	8.6%	3.2%	2.1%
French or Haitian Creole	12.5%	12.5%	5.5%	3.7%	1.5%
Portuguese	N/A (Note: Not counted separately; aggregated into "Other" category)	9.5%	4.9%	0.4%	N/A
Yiddish	N/A	0.6%	1.2%	2.4%	N/A
Other Languages	15.1%	5.5%	5.1%	5.0%	8.7%

Nativity	2015 (Note: Refers to 2013–2017 American Community Survey data; the last Decennial Census where foreign-born population data was collected was in the 2000 census)	2010 (Note: Refers to 2008–2012 American Community Survey data; the last Decennial Census where foreign-born population data was collected was in the 2000 census)	2000	1990	1980
% population native-born	66.0%	68.5%	77.3%	84.9%	85.5%
... born in the United States	63.9%	66.5%	75.8%	83.8%	84.8%
... born in Puerto Rico or Island Areas	0.9%	1.1%	0.9%	0.3%	0.7%
... born to American parents abroad	1.2%	0.9%	0.7%	0.8%	0.7%
% population foreign-born (Note: Only countries of birth which at least 2% of residents were born in at any time since 1980 are mentioned)	34.0%	31.5%	22.7%	15.1%	14.5%
... born in Haiti	7.9%	7.3%	2.8%	2.1%	N/A
... born in Brazil	7.1%	8.3%	4.7%	0.3%	N/A
... born in Canada	2.2%	2.2%	2.0%	1.6%	1.6%
... born in Russia	0.2%	0.1%	0.4%	1.4%	2.4%
... born in Poland	0.1%	0.6%	0.9%	1.7% (Note: Data from the 1980 census and 1990 census pertains to residents born anywhere in the Soviet Union, not just Russia)	2.8%
... born in other countries	16.5%	13.0%	11.9%	8.0%	7.7%

=== 2000 census ===
As of 2000, 16.3% of households had children under 18 living with them, 38.2% were married couples living together, 9.6% had a female householder with no husband present, and 48.9% were not families. About 40.3% of all households were made up of individuals, and 22.5% had someone living alone who was 65 or older. The average household size was 2.02, and the average family size was 2.72.

In 2000, the median income in the city for a household was $34,041 and for a family was $44,853. Males had a median income of $35,154 versus $27,451 for females. The per capita income for the city was $23,296. About 9.2% of families and 12.5% of the population were below the poverty line, including 20.3% of those under 18 and 10.2% of those 65 or over.

As of 2000, Deerfield Beach also had the highest percentage of Brazilian and Brazilian American population in the United States at 11.06%. It also has a significant percentage of Haitian and Haitian American residents in the United States at 12.1%.

== Arts and culture ==
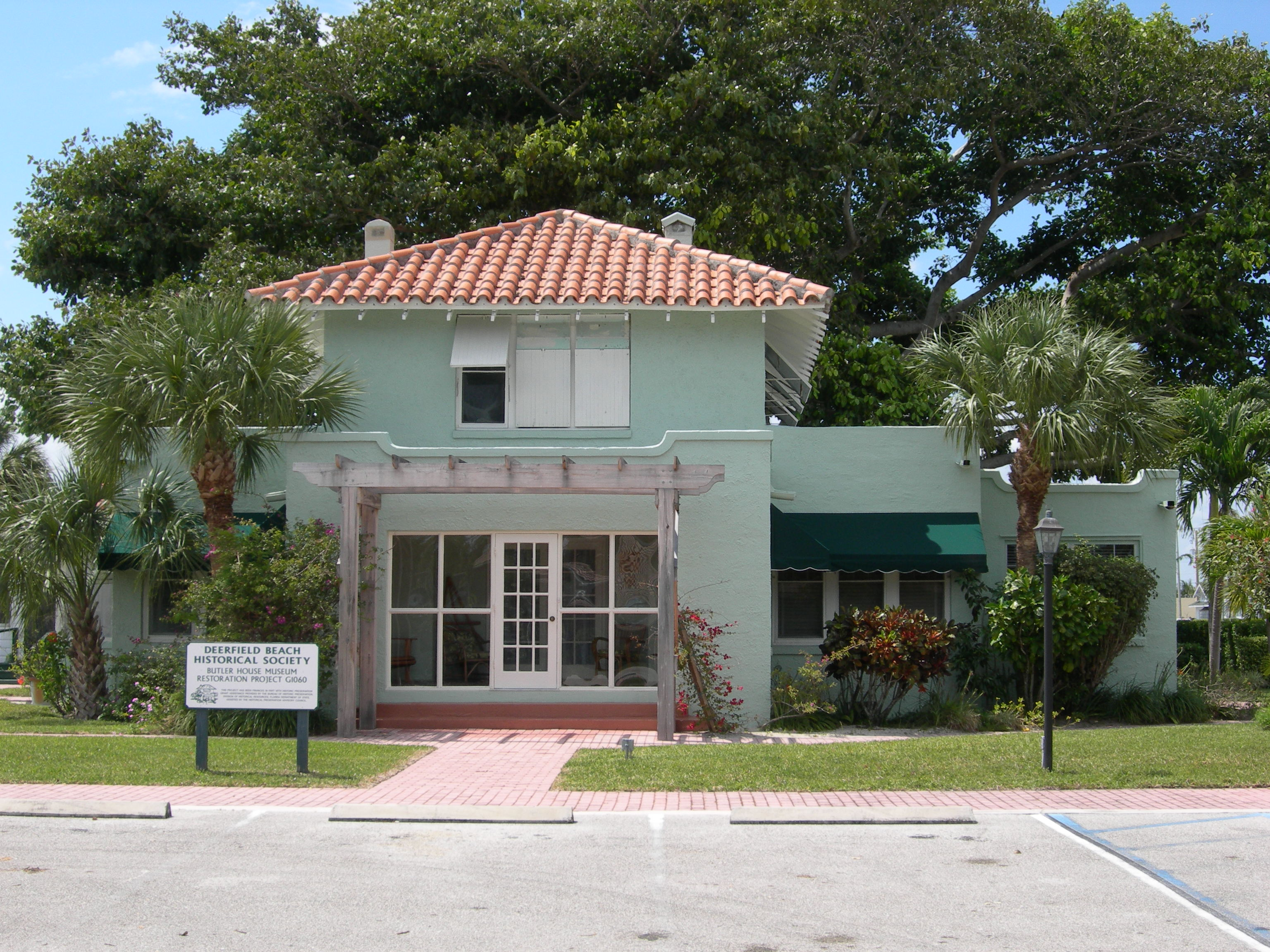
The James D. and Alice Butler House, built in 1923, a historic house museum operated by the Deerfield Beach Historical Society

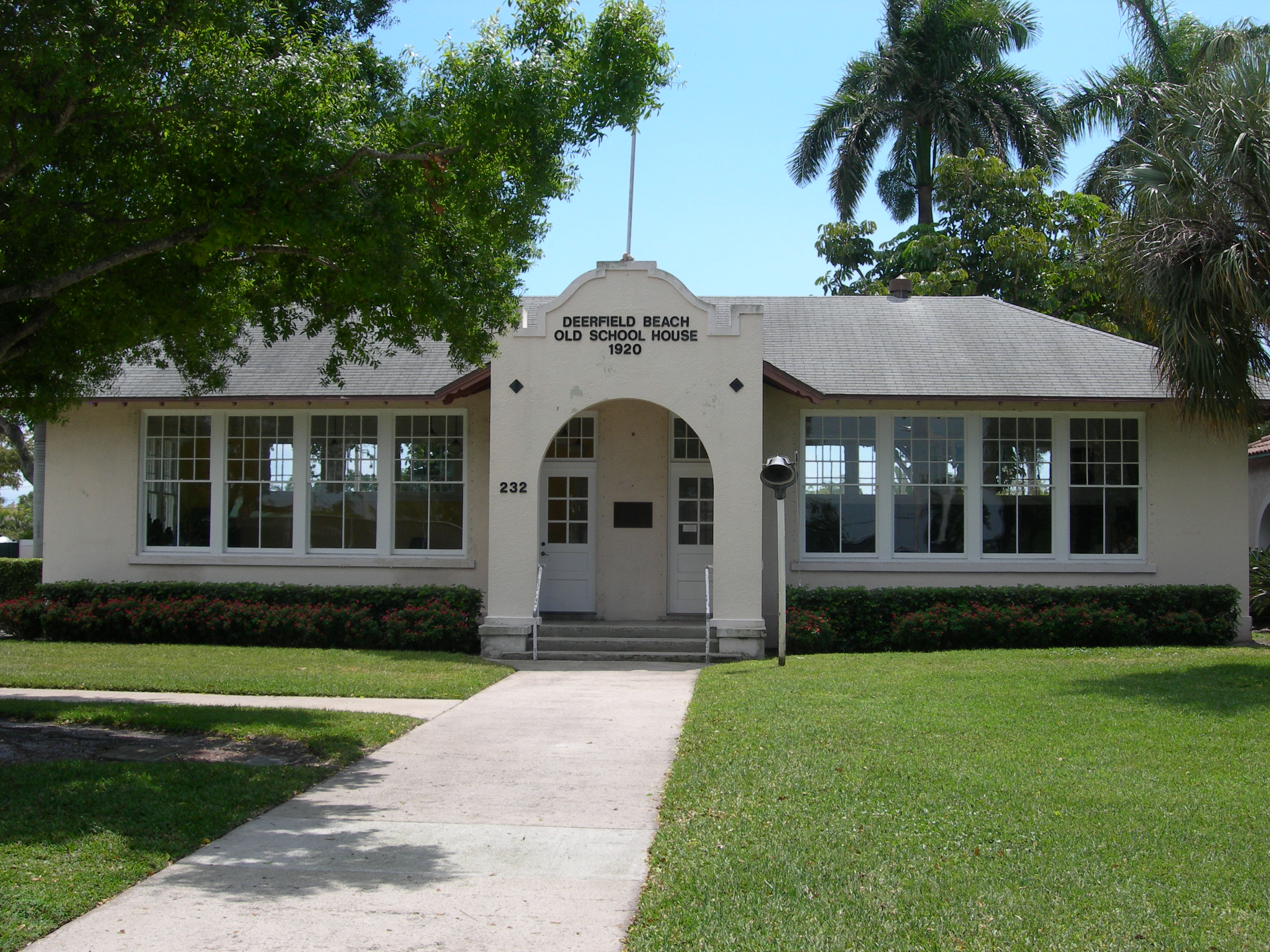
The Old Deerfield School, built in 1920 in Spanish Mission and Spanish Mediterranean styles.

=== Cultural events ===
The City of Deerfield Beach organizes free live music and cultural events in parks around the city throughout the year. Two major cultural series are "All that Jazz" with free, live jazz music and "Movies in the Park". These events are held outdoors in major parks around the city such as Crystal Heights Central Park.

=== Museums and historic sites ===
Deerfield Beach has numerous historic sites and museums, many operated by the Deerfield Beach Historical Society. Most of the oldest structures in the city date to the 1920s. Two major historic sites operated by the historical society and open to the public are the James D. and Alice Butler House, a historic house museum, built in 1923 in a Spanish Mediterranean style, and the Old Deerfield School, a historic school house built in 1920 in Spanish Mission and Spanish Mediterranean architectural styles. Additionally, the historical society operates the Deerfield Beach Historical Society Museum and Culture Center, in a Mid-century Modern house, for arts, music, and cultural events.

The Deerfield Beach Station is a historic, Spanish Mediterranean railway station built in 1926 by the Seaboard Air Line Railroad. Today, the station serves Amtrak and Tri-Rail. Inside the train station, the South Florida Railway Museum has model trains, train equipment, and historic rail artifacts.

The Museum of Discovery and Science is building a new museum, the Deerfield Beach Marine Science Center, with exhibits focused on marine science and South Florida's subtropical ecology and ecosystems. The new museum is planned to open in the summer of 2026.

=== Libraries ===
Two locations of the Broward County Library system are in Deerfield Beach: Century Plaza and Percy White.

== Beaches and parks ==
=== Beaches ===
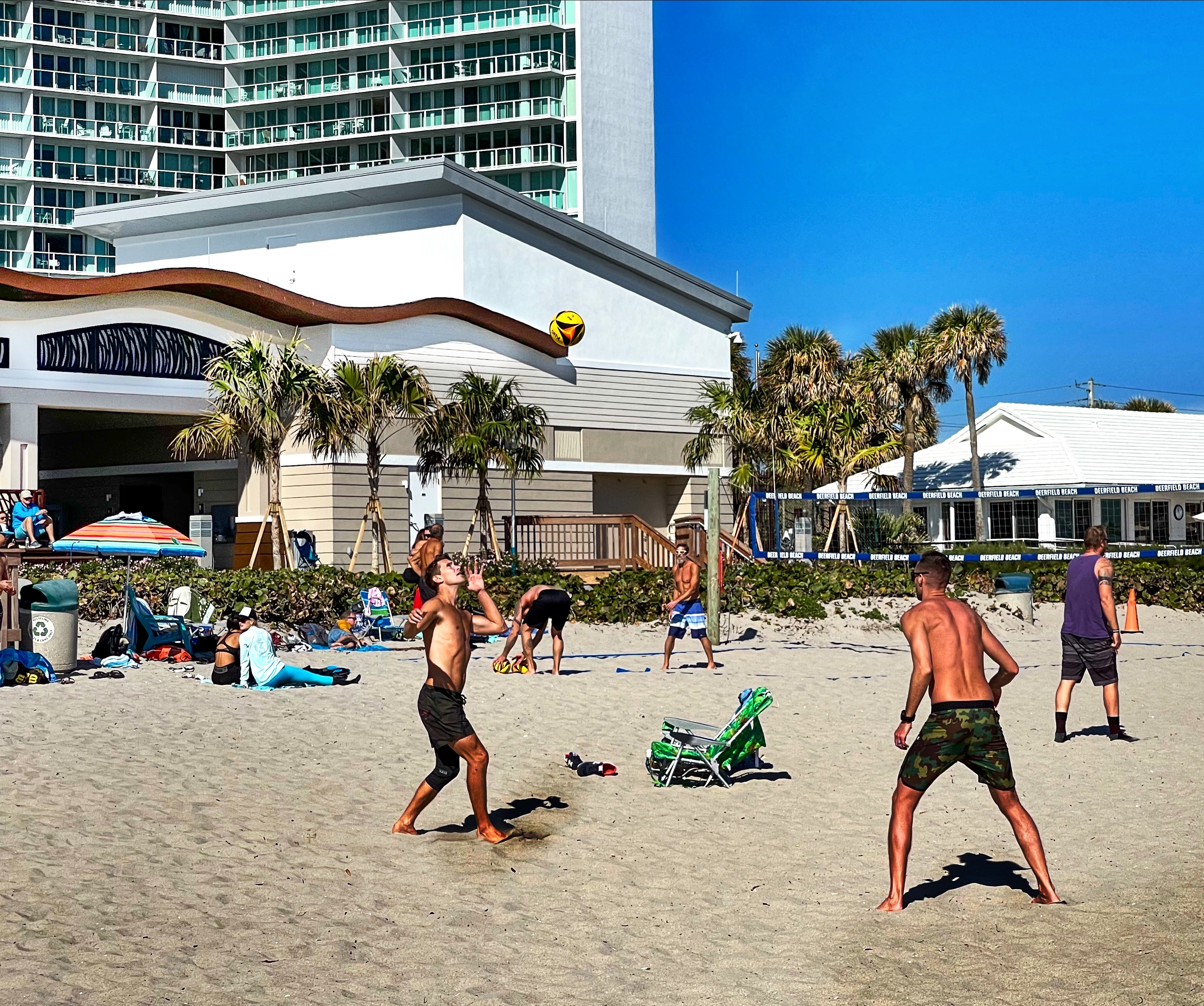
Deerfield Beach

Deerfield Beach is famous for its beach on the Atlantic Ocean, its boardwalk along Ocean Way, and the Deerfield Beach International Fishing Pier on Deerfield Beach Island.

Deerfield Beach is a popular spot for surfing. The area of the beach north of the pier is more popular with more skilled and competitive surfers. The southern end of the beach is more popular for beginner and intermediate surfers.

Deerfield Beach is also a protected sea turtle habitat and a popular spot for sea turtle nesting. Lighting on the beach is designed to be dimmer to avoid disorienting the sea turtles. The three main sea turtle species in Deerfield Beach are the loggerhead sea turtle, green sea turtle, and leatherback sea turtle.

=== Parks and nature preserves ===
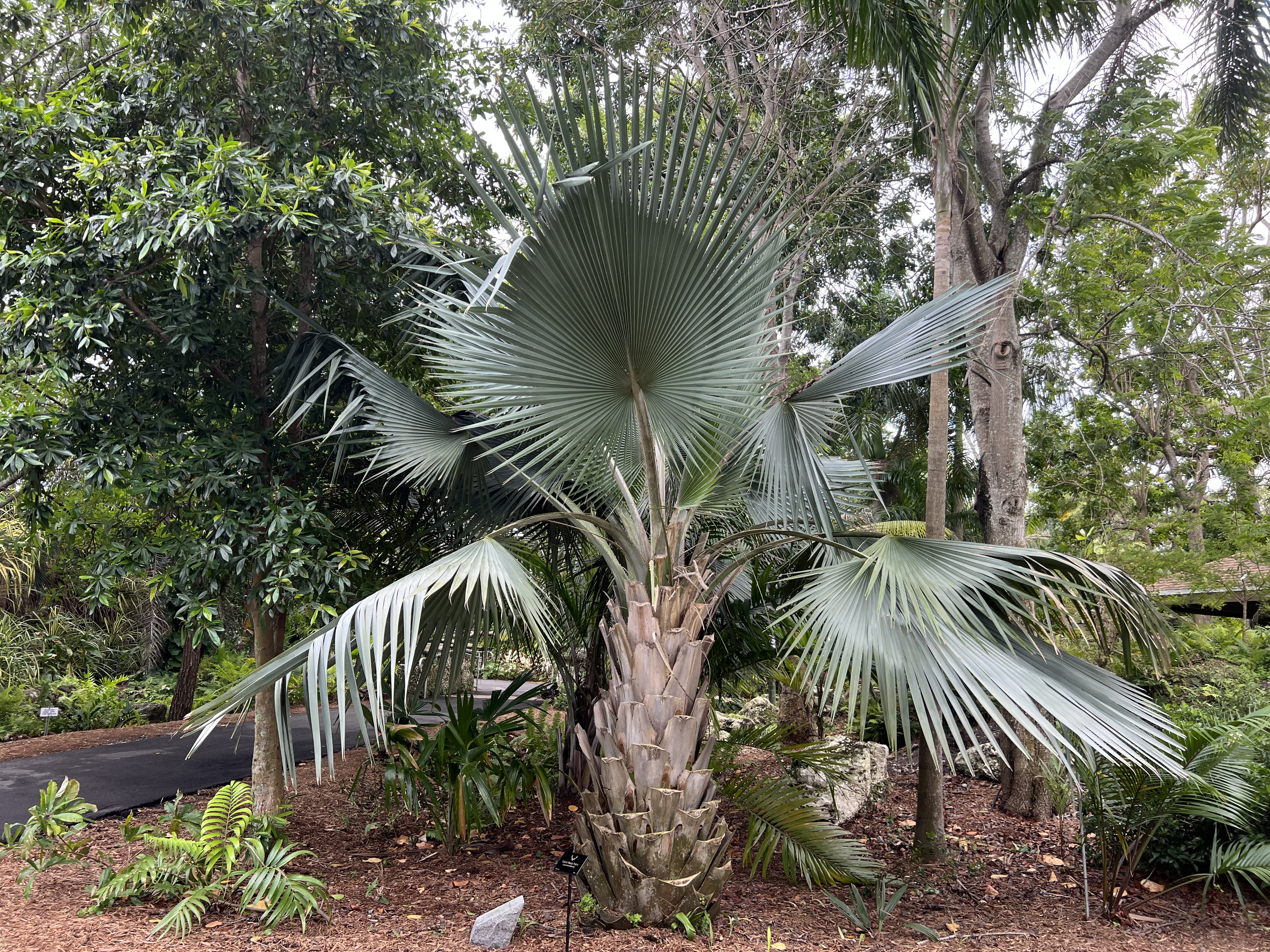
The Deerfield Beach Arboretum, an arboretum and botanical garden, has more than 200 different species of trees and palms from around the world.

The City of Deerfield Beach operates 54 parks throughout the city of varying size and uses. Two of the best known parks in the city are Pioneer Park in the city's historic center and the Deerfield Beach Arboretum, an arboretum and botanical garden. The Deerfield Beach Arboretum contains more than 200 different species of trees and palms from around the world with more than 50 different species of flowering trees, waterfalls, and gardens. Other parks, playgrounds, nature preserves and athletic facilities are scattered throughout the city's neighborhoods.

Quiet Waters Park, the largest park in the city, includes water skiing, bicycling, and walking trails. The Florida Renaissance Festival is held annually in Quiet Waters Park.

Deerfield Island Park is a nature preserve and only island park in Broward County. The island park is accessible by a free public ferry from Sullivan Park.

One 18-hole golf course is in the city, the Deer Creek Golf Club.

==== Future public park ====
The city is planning to build a new public park on the site of the former Tam O'Santer Golf Course off of Military Trail in Crystal Lake (1085 NW 45th St). The new park, called Marty Popelsky Park, will have about 50 acres of green space, making it one of the largest parks in the city. As of November 2025, the city was working on design ideas for the public park, which include more trees, walking and bicycle trails, gardens, nature preserves, and athletic fields.

Beaches and parks

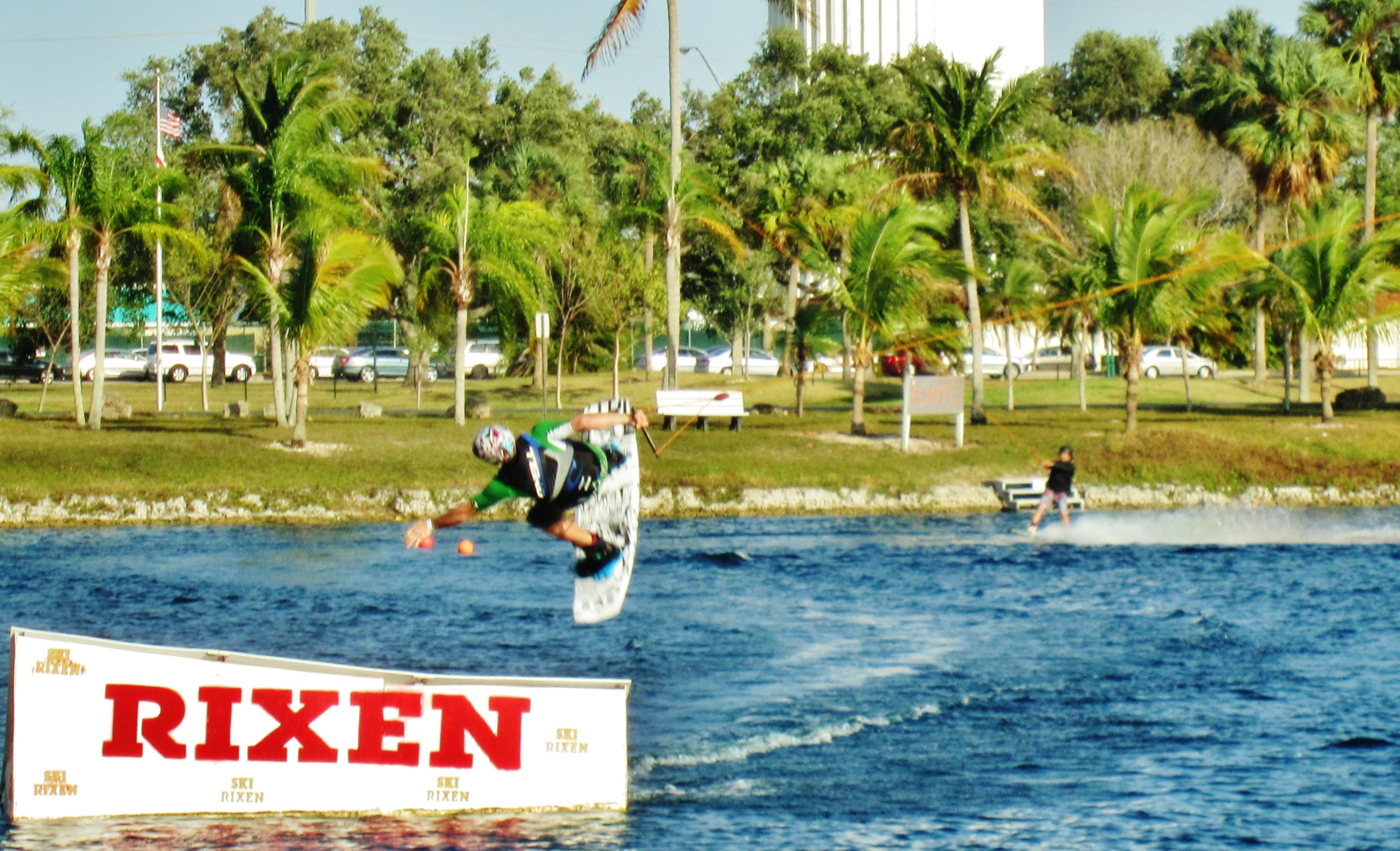
Cable skiing at Quiet Waters Park

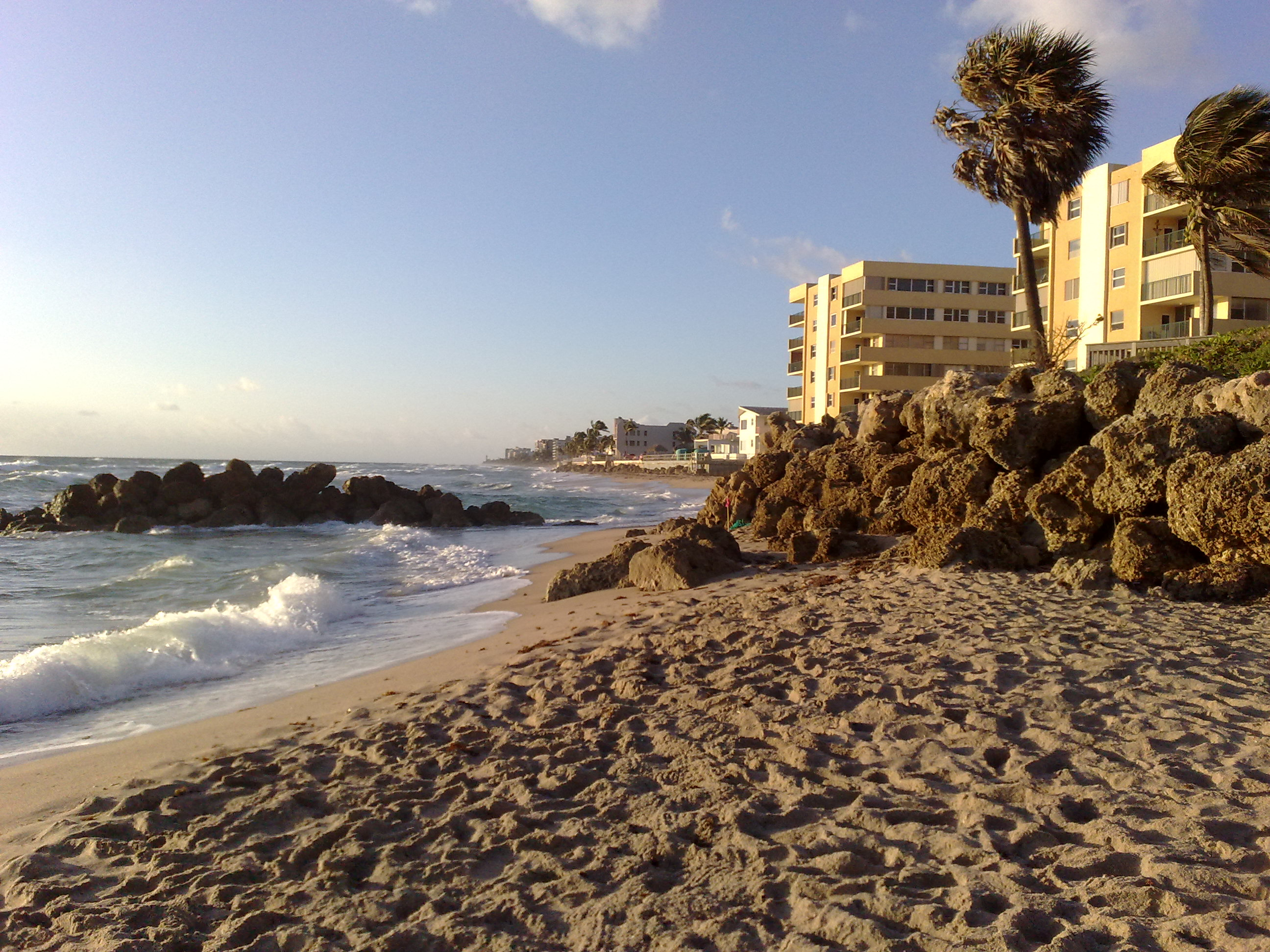
View of Deerfield Beach

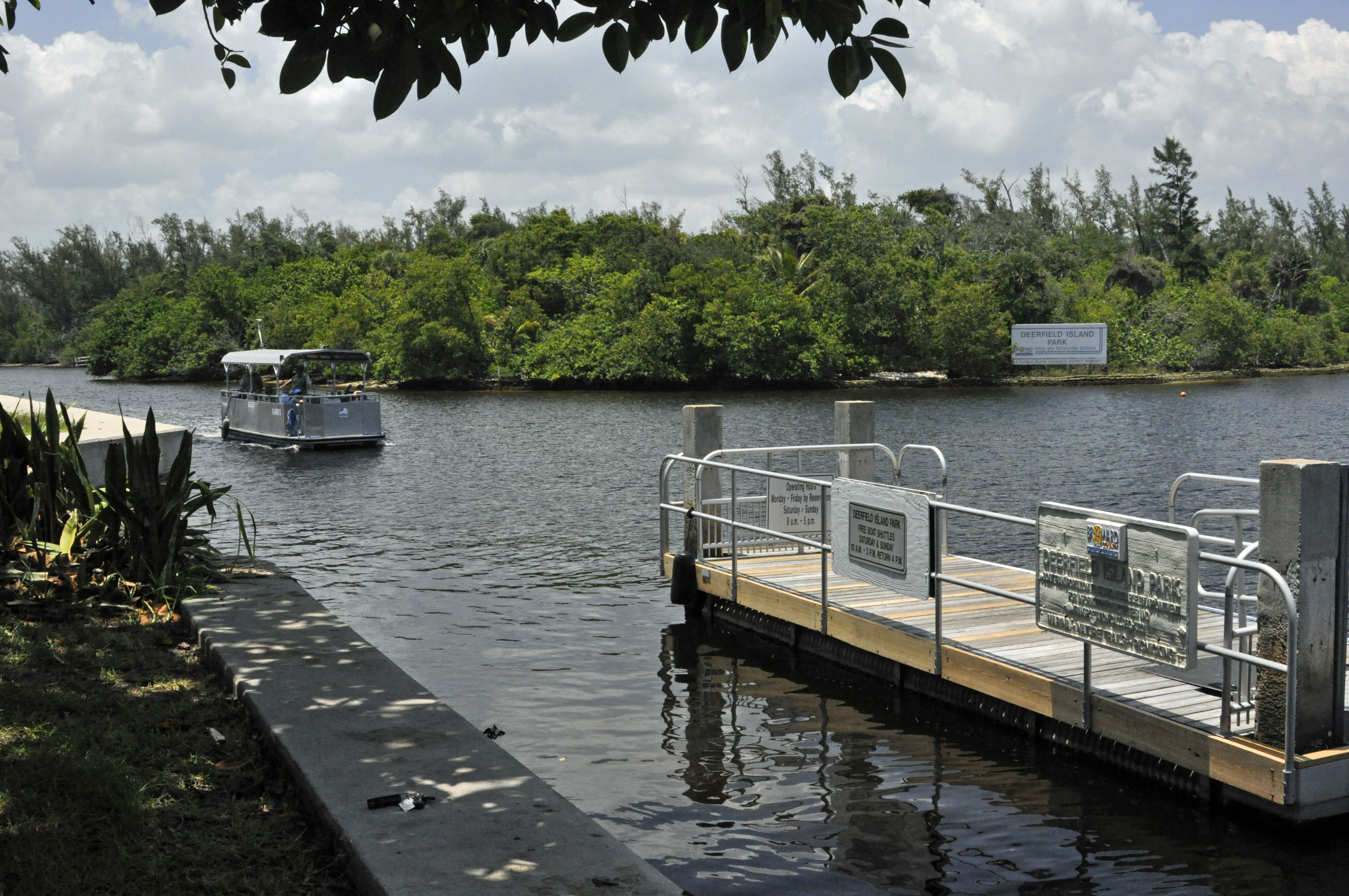
Deerfield Island Park, a 53-acre protected nature sanctuary of native flora and fauna

== Economy ==
Deerfield Beach is the headquarters of JM Family Enterprises, Southeast Toyota Distributors, MAPEI Americas, YouFit, and Ashbritt.

== Education ==
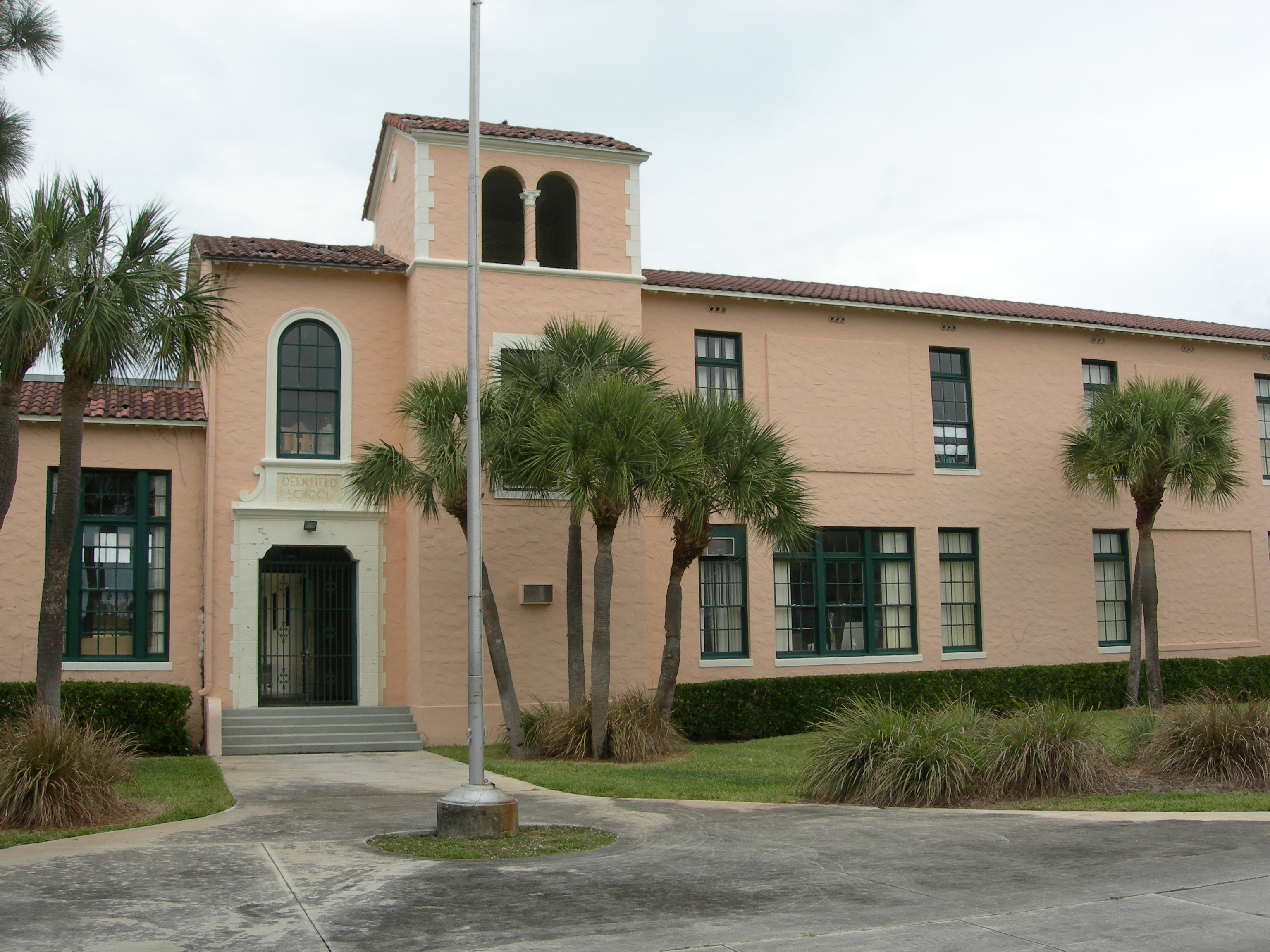
Deerfield Beach Elementary School, a historic school, was built in 1926–1927 in the Spanish Mediterranean Revival architectural style.

Public schools are administered by Broward County Public Schools. The city has five public elementary schools, one public middle school, and one public high school in Deerfield Beach, as well as numerous private institutions:

=== Elementary schools ===
- Deerfield Beach Elementary School
- Deerfield Park Elementary School
- Park Ridge Elementary School
- Quiet Waters Elementary School
- Tedder Elementary School

=== Middle schools ===
- Deerfield Beach Middle School
- Lyons Creek Middle School in Coconut Creek
- Crystal Lake Middle School in Pompano Beach

=== Zoned high schools ===
- Deerfield Beach High School
- Monarch High School in Coconut Creek
- Blanche Ely High School in Pompano Beach

=== Private schools ===
- Highlands Christian Academy
- St. Ambrose Catholic School, founded in 1964 and operated by the Roman Catholic Archdiocese of Miami.

=== Charter school ===
- Somerset Academy Key

== Politics ==
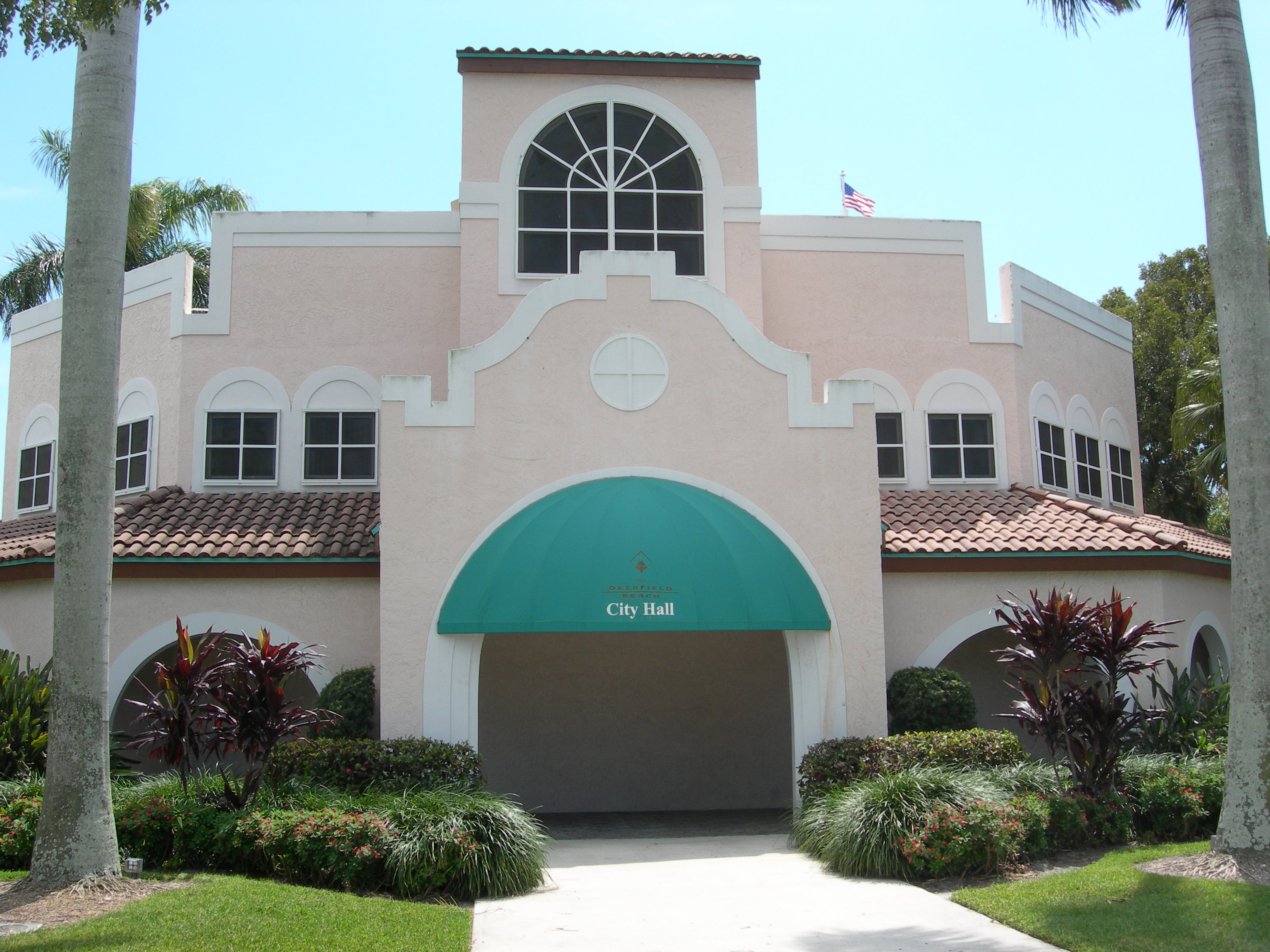
Deerfield Beach City Hall

Deerfield Beach leans left towards the Democratic Party. In the last four U.S. presidential elections, the Democratic candidates have won in Deerfield Beach by a majority.

In the 2024 United States presidential election, Democrat Kamala Harris won Deerfield Beach by a majority. Harris received 17,393 votes or 53.3% of the votes, and Republican Donald Trump received 15,521 votes or 46.7%. In the 2020 United States presidential election, Democrat Joseph Biden won Deerfield Beach by a majority. Biden received 21,776 votes or 60.3% of the votes, and Republican Donald Trump received 14,340 votes or 39.7%. In the 2016 general election, Democrat Hillary Clinton won Deerfield Beach with 62.6% of votes. In the 2012 general election, Democrat Barack Obama won Deerfield Beach with 65.2% of votes.

Deerfield Beach is within U.S. congressional districts 20th district and 23rd district. Both districts are represented by Democrats. The 20th district is represented by Democrat Sheila Cherfilus-McCormick and the 23rd district is represented by Democrat Jared Moskowitz.

Deerfield Beach presidential election results
Year	Democratic	Republican
2024	53.3% 17,393	46.7% 15,251
2020	60.3% 21,776	39.7% 14,340
2016	62.6% 19,277	37.4% 11,500
2012	65.2% 18,866	34.8% 10,053

== Transportation ==
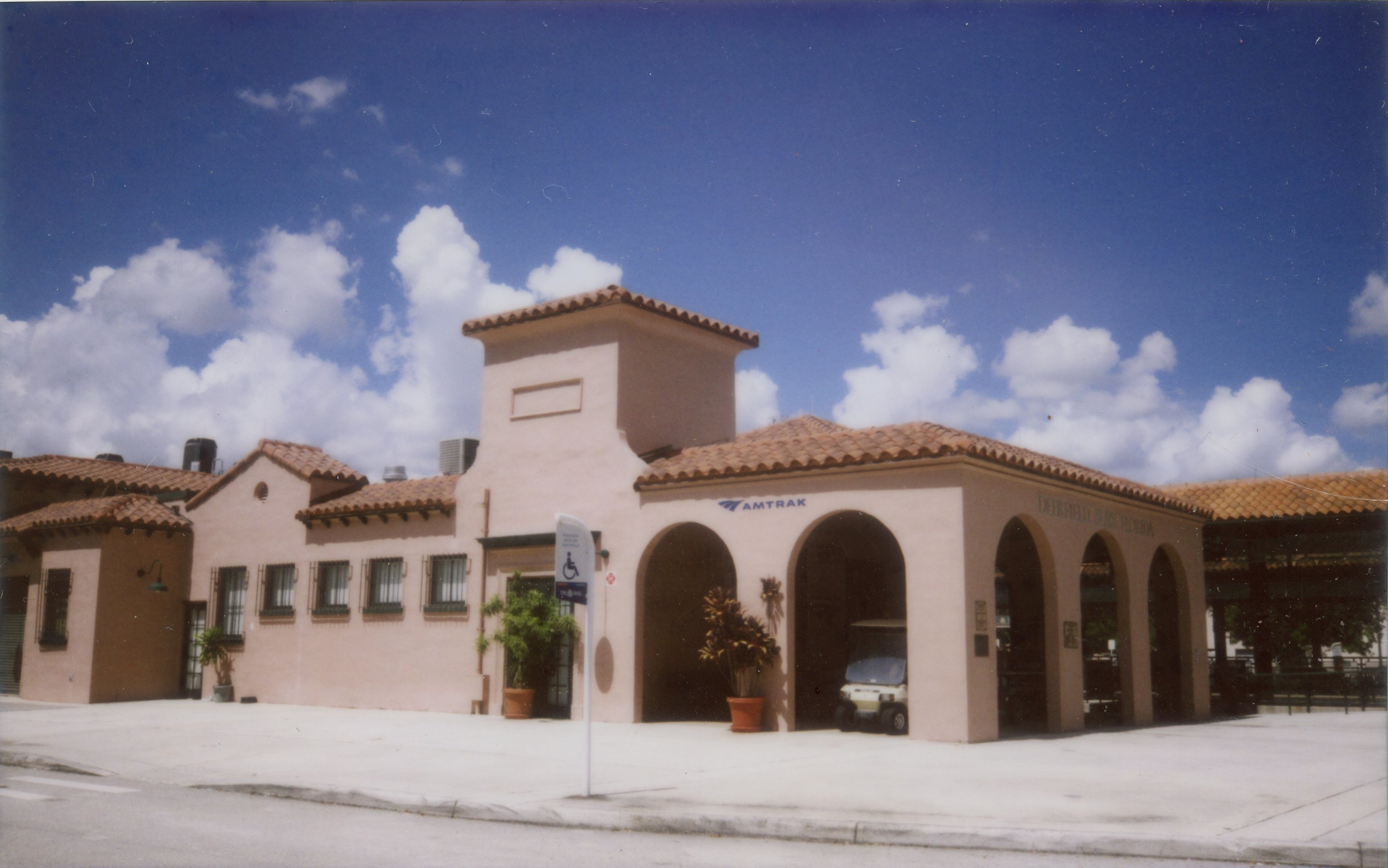
Deerfield Beach Station, opened in 1926, currently serves Amtrak, Tri-Rail and Broward County Transit bus service.

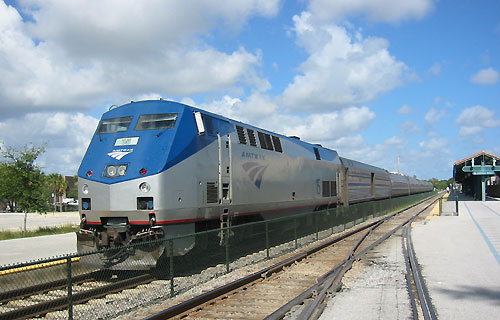
An Amtrak train at Deerfield Beach station. The city is served by daily Amtrak service to New York City and Chicago.

Rail service in Deerfield Beach is served by Amtrak and Tri-Rail at the Deerfield Beach Station. Bus service is operated by Broward County Transit. Fort Lauderdale–Hollywood International Airport is the nearest international airport and Miami International Airport is the primary international airport for flights to Latin America and Europe. Both airports can be accessed via Tri-Rail.

=== Intercity rail ===
Amtrak operates two daily services at Deerfield Beach Station, the Silver Meteor to New York City and the Floridian to Chicago. The Silver Meteor train runs daily to New York City via Orlando, Washington, DC, and Philadelphia. The Floridian runs daily to Chicago via Tampa, Orlando, Washington, DC, and other cities north. Brightline also provides intercity rail service to Miami and Orlando at the nearby Boca Raton station.

=== Commuter rail ===
Tri-Rail runs frequent commuter rail service to Miami to Miami International Airport and MiamiCentral in Downtown Miami, as well as north to West Palm Beach.

=== Bus ===
Broward County Transit operates six bus routes in the city that connect Deerfield Beach to nearby neighborhoods of Fort Lauderdale, Boca Raton, Coral Springs, Pompano Beach, and other points around Broward County.

- Bus route 10: North-south along Federal Highway to/from Mizner Park (Boca Raton) and Downtown Fort Lauderdale
- Bus route 14: North-south along Powerline Road to/from Deerfield Mall and Downtown Fort Lauderdale
- Bus route 20: North-south to/from Broward Health North
- Bus route 34: East-west along Sample Road to/from Coral Springs
- Bus route 48: East-West along Hillsboro Boulevard to/from West Deerfield Beach and the beach
- Bus route 50: North-south along Dixie Highway to/from Downtown Fort Lauderdale

=== Waterways ===
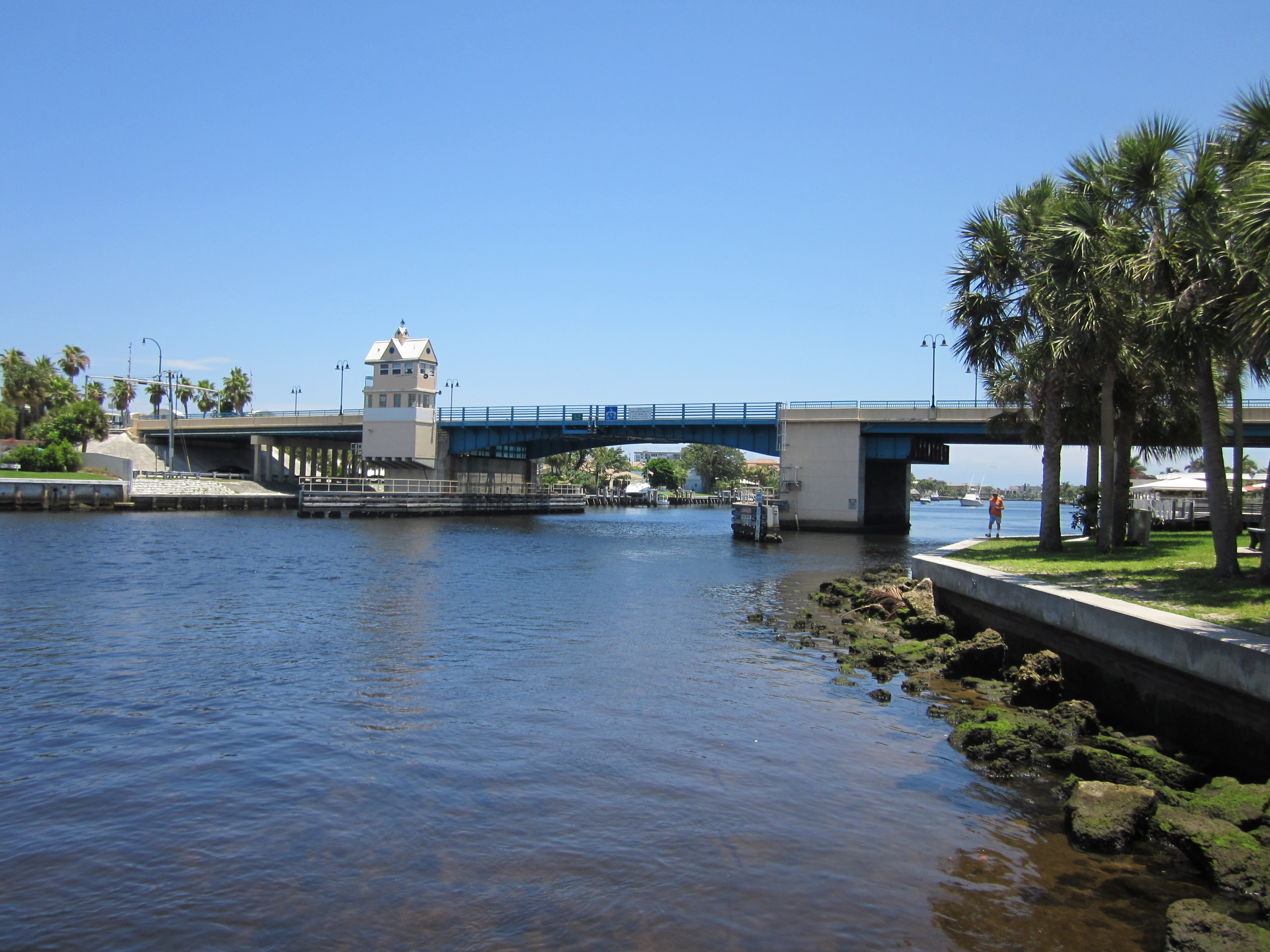
The Hillsboro Blvd Bridge over the Intracoastal Waterway.

Aside from the Atlantic Ocean, the city has two major waterways, the Hillsboro River and the Intracoastal Waterway. The Hillsboro River goes east-west and forms the city's northern boundary. The river connects to the Intracoastal Waterway near Deerfield Island Park. The Intracoastal Waterway follows the South Florida coast line, continuing south to Biscayne Bay in Miami and north to West Palm Beach. Both waterways are navigable by boat and are home to numerous marinas, and are also popular sites for kayaking.

== Healthcare ==
Broward Health North, operated by Broward Health, is located in Deerfield Beach. The hospital has 409 beds and is an adult Level II trauma center providing care for more than 50,000 medical emergencies and 14,000 hospitalized patients. Broward Health is one of the 10 largest public health systems in the United States. Other nearby hospitals include Boca Raton Regional Hospital, HCA Florida Northwest Hospital (formerly Northwest Regional Hospital), and Holy Cross Hospital, a 557-bed Catholic hospital.

== Media ==
Deerfield Beach is a part of the Miami-Fort Lauderdale-Hollywood media market, which is the twelfth largest radio market and the seventeenth largest television market in the United States. Its primary daily newspapers are the South Florida Sun-Sentinel and The Miami Herald, and their Spanish-language counterparts El Sentinel and El Nuevo Herald. Local Deerfield-based media includes The Observer, a local weekly newspaper, New Pelican, a local newspaper, and the Deerfield Times, published by Sun-Sentinel.

== Notable people ==
- Eli Abaev, American-Israeli basketball player
- Jamie Foy, professional skateboarder
- Jerry Jeudy, NFL wide receiver for the Cleveland Browns
- Canton Jones, Christian hip-hop artist
- BLP Kosher, rapper
- Gangrel, American professional wrestler
- Trapland Pat, rapper
- James Pierre, NFL cornerback for the Minnesota Vikings
- Jason Pierre-Paul, NFL linebacker for the Tampa Bay Buccaneers
- Denard Robinson, former NFL running back for the Jacksonville Jaguars
- Devin Singletary, NFL running back for the New York Giants
- Chaz Stevens, political activist
- Amadeo Trinchitella, political organizer and activist

== Sister city ==
Deerfield Beach has one sister city, as designated by Sister Cities International: Acre, Israel.
