= James D. and Alice Butler House =

Historic house in Florida, United States

- U.S. National Register of Historic Places
- Florida Historic Site
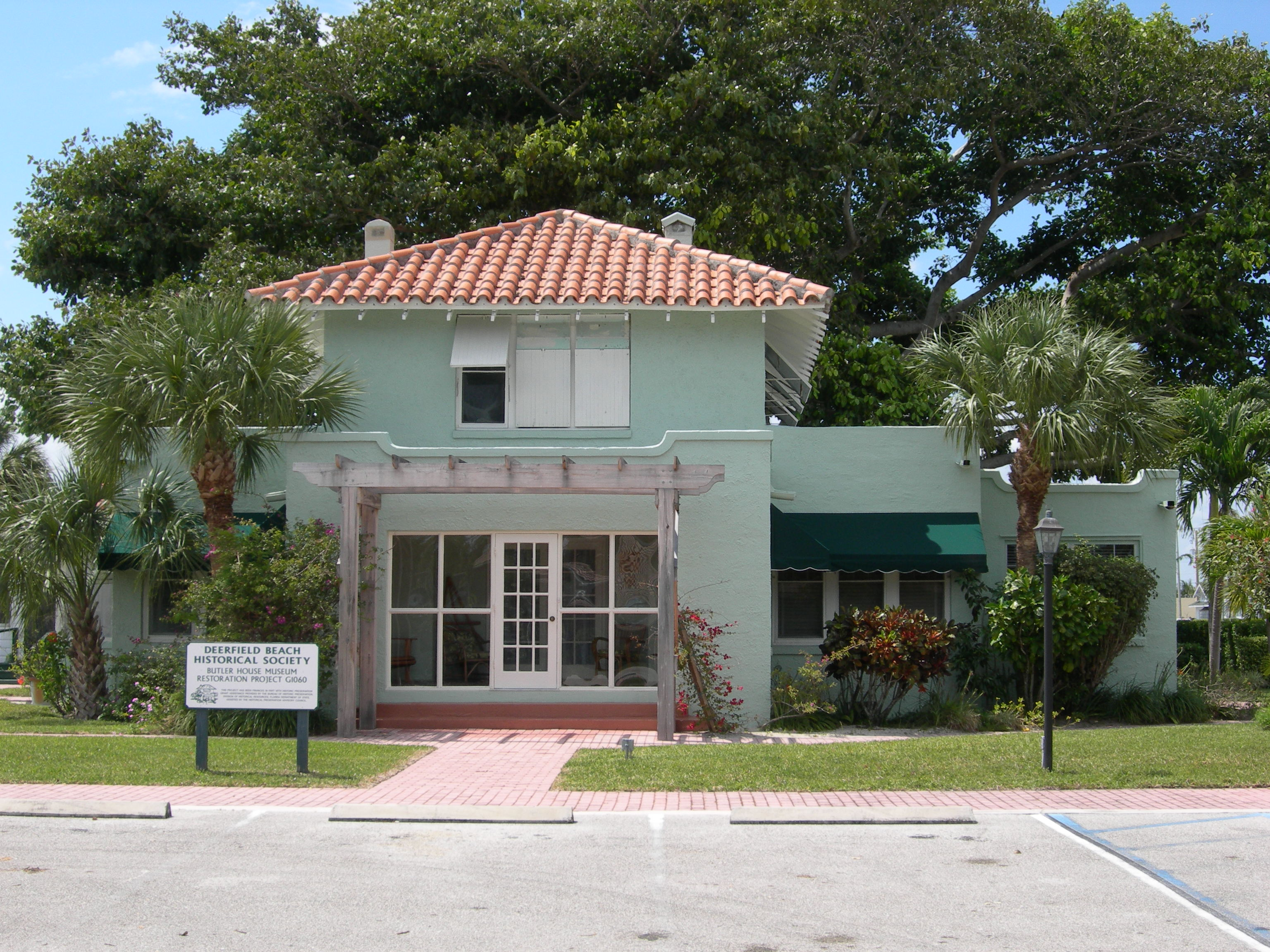

- Location within Florida Location within the United States
- Location: Deerfield Beach, Florida
- Coordinates: 26°19′04.97″N 80°05′52.74″W
- NRHP reference No.: 95000916

Significant dates
- Added to NRHP: 28 July 1995
- Designated FHS: 1974

The James D. and Alice Butler House, commonly known as the Butler House, is a historic house museum in Deerfield Beach, Florida. It is located at 380 East Hillsboro Boulevard. On July 28, 1995, it was added to the U.S. National Register of Historic Places.

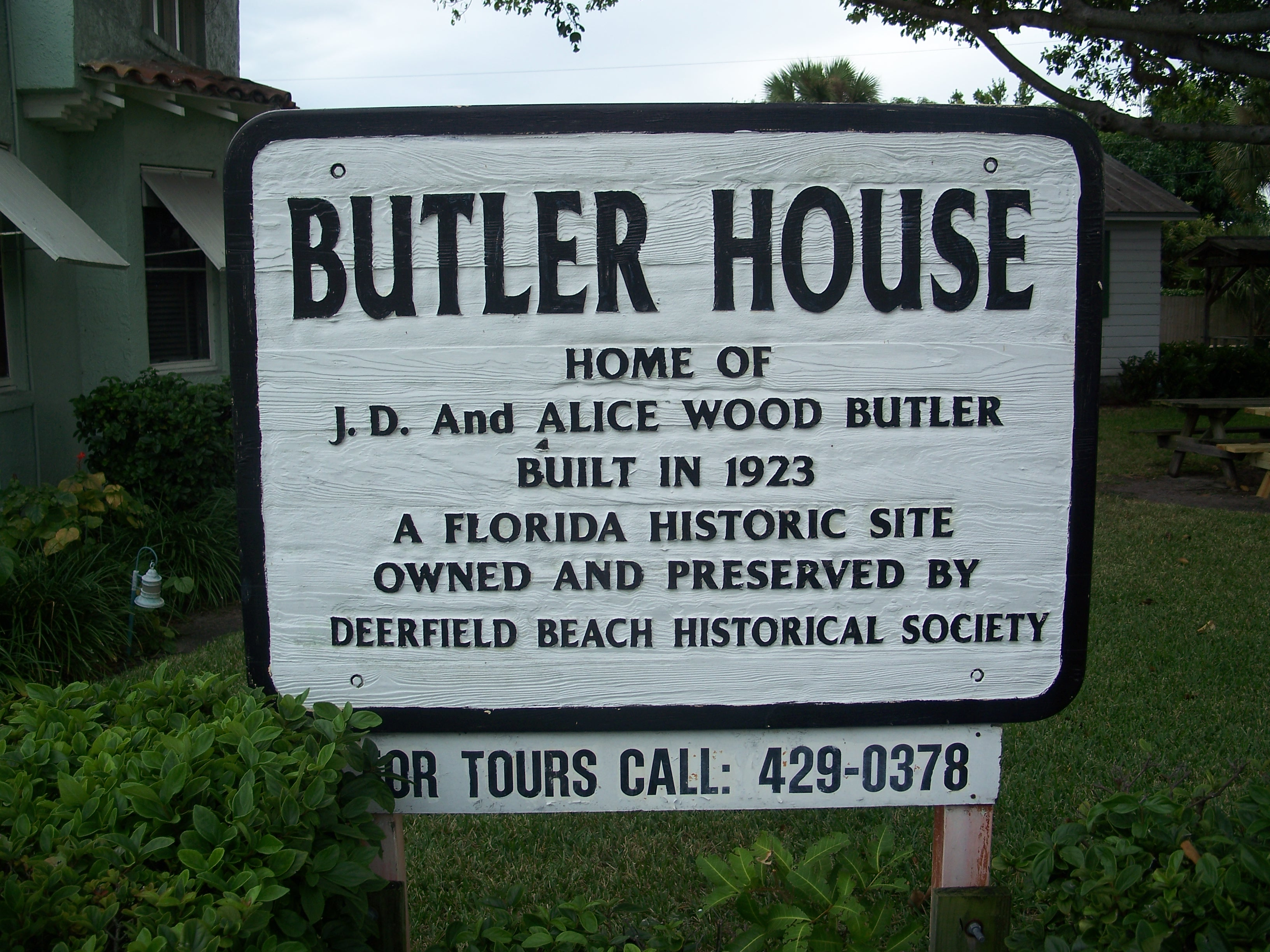

== Building ==
Built in the Mediterranean Revival style it was the home of early Deerfield Beach settlers and civic leaders, James D. and Alice Wood Butler. Alice Butler obtained the plans for the house from a popular ladies' magazine, the Ladies Home Journal of September 1923. Situated on almost four city lots the home was built by Gulfstream Lumber Company of Delray at a cost of $10,000. It was built on the site of home the Butlers had purchased in 1912 for $300. The building is constructed of hollow tile, the interior walls are plaster on lath and the roof is made from Spanish terracotta tiles.

In 1974 the home was designated a Florida Historic Site. In 1977 the Butler family deeded the home and grounds to the Deerfield Beach Historical Society which operates it as a historic house museum.

== Modern times ==
The Butler House has been fully restored and contains many of the original furnishings, an exception being the dining room table that was replaced after the original had been used to protect the west dining room window during the San Felipe Segundo hurricane in 1928. The wicker furniture purchased by the Butlers in 1923 for $500 is featured, as are hats from the flapper era and the lion's paw bathtub. As of 2018 the house is open to the public monthly. The property features a one–hundred year old Banyan tree where the Deerfield Beach Historical Society holds events. The society operates the property as an event venue and maintains its headquarters there in addition to the function of the home as a museum.
