= Ashbritt =

Disaster Recovery and Environmental Services

AshBritt, Inc.
- Type: Private
- Industry: Disaster relief
- Founded: August 1992; 34 years ago Broward County, Florida, U.S.
- Founder: Randall "Randy" Perkins
- Headquarters: Deerfield Beach, Florida, United States
- Area served: North America
- Key people: Brittany Castillo CEO; Randy Perkins, Chairman
- Services: Disaster recovery Debris removal, management, reduction, processing, recycling, and disposal Emergency planning Damage mitigation Risk abatement Emergency logistics
- Website: www.ashbritt.com

AshBritt, Inc. is located in Deerfield Beach, Florida and is a company specializing in disaster relief and emergency logistics operations.

== Overview ==
AshBritt is a Florida-based, national rapid-response disaster recovery and special environmental services contractor. AshBritt was founded in 1992 and has managed and executed more than 570 missions ranging from debris management to emergency base camps and temporary facilities. AshBritt has been involved in the debris recovery efforts of over 110 federally declared major disasters in 34 states, beginning with Hurricane Andrew.

== Hurricane Katrina ==
Following Hurricane Katrina in August 2005, as the United States Army Corps of Engineers (USACE) Advanced Contracting Initiative (ACI) contractor for U.S. Region 3, AshBritt was the Initial Response contractor for both Louisiana and Mississippi.

In Mississippi, AshBritt conducted debris removal, hazardous tree mitigation and demolition services in 17 jurisdictions, covering over 8,400 square miles (22,000 km^{2}) and over 175 miles (280 km) inland.

== Other Notable Responses ==
AshBritt also played a part in assisting with cleanup from Hurricane Sandy, working with at least 15 counties and 43 municipalities in New Jersey to clear around 3 million cubic yards of debris.

In 2016, AshBritt worked across Florida, Georgia, and South Carolina.

AshBritt was contracted to stack shipping containers along the Arizona border in late 2022, as part of an initiative by Governor Doug Ducey to fill gaps in existing border fencing erected under the Trump administration.

Following a threat of litigation by the Department of Justice and two lawsuits filed by the Center for Biological Diversity against Ducey and AshBritt, AshBritt began work to remove the makeshift barrier in early January 2023.
