= Deerfield Beach Arboretum =

Arboretum and botanical garden in Deerfield Beach, Florida, United States

- Tree Zoo
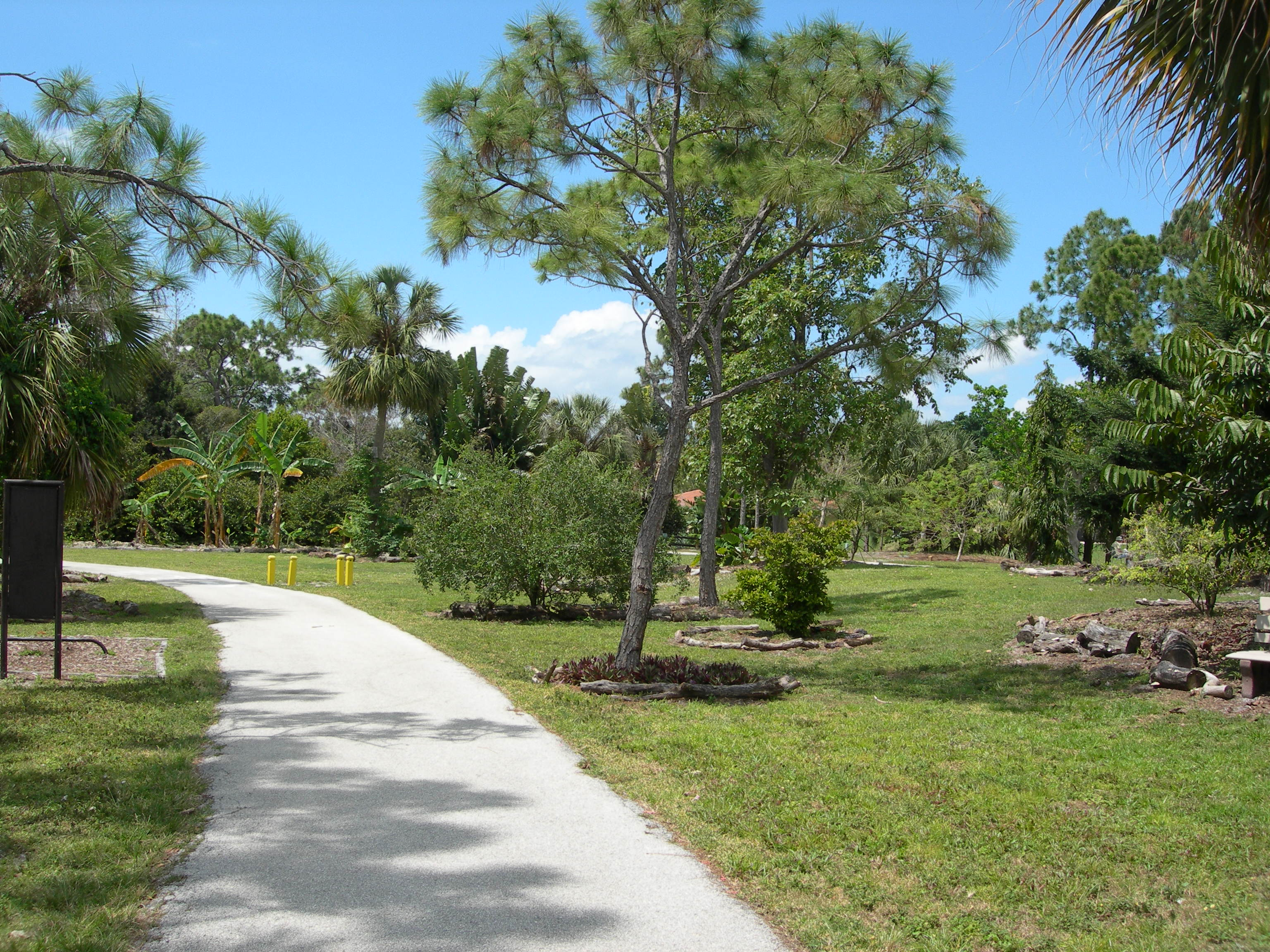
- View of the Deerfield Beach Arboretum.
- Interactive map of Deerfield Beach Arboretum
- Type: Public botanical garden
- Location: 2841 W. Hillsboro Blvd; Deerfield Beach, Florida, 33442
- Coordinates: 26°19′07″N 80°08′32″W
- Area: 9 acres (3.6 ha)
- Established: April 28, 1995; 31 years ago on Arbor Day
- Owner: City of Deerfield Beach
- Manager: City of Deerfield Beach Parks & Recreation; Friends of the Deerfield Beach Arboretum
- Status: Open year round, free to visit
- Public transit: Tri-Rail: Deerfield Beach Station
- Other information: Free to visit
- Website: Official website

The Deerfield Beach Arboretum, also known as the Tree Zoo, is an arboretum and botanical garden located in Deerfield Beach, Florida, United States. It covers 9 acres (3.6 ha). It is owned by the city of Deerfield Beach and managed by The Friends of the Deerfield Beach Arboretum. It contains more than 200 different species of trees and palms from around the world, with more than 50 different species of flowering trees. The Deerfield Beach Arboretum was established on April 28, 1995 on Arbor Day, and celebrated its 30th anniversary in 2025.

The Arboretum was founded by the then city forester, Zeke Landis, in 1995 with a selection of 22 trees and palms, and has since grown to 325 species (excluding native) of palms, tropical fruit trees, exotic flowering and canopy trees, bamboos, and miscellaneous exotic trees. Arboretum areas currently include: bamboo, butterfly garden, children's garden, exotic canopy trees, flowering trees, native canopy trees, orchid display, palm trees, spice and herb garden, tropical fruit trees, and a wetlands demonstration area.

The Deerfield Beach Arboretum is free to visit and open to the public from sunrise to sunset.

== Visitor information ==
The Arboretum is currently maintained by the Friends of the Deerfield Beach Arboretum which hosts a workday every first Saturday of the month (about 3 hours 9am -12 noon followed by a free lunch). There are tours every Friday at 10:00am (also same time on first Saturday of the month). There is a free horticultural presentation on the second Thursday of the month at 7 pm in the Constitution Park building from September to May. The Arboretum is currently open from dawn to dusk and is free. There is a children's playground on the site. There is a paved trail which as a circle measures a half mile with exercise stations.

== Plant collection ==
The plant collection is varied and extensive. As of December 2025, there are 247 plants cataloged in the botanical gardens collection. Each plant is meticulously registered in the Arboretum's plant database and are mapped out by location in GIS. Each plant is cataloged by its name in Latin.

Some of the plants at the arboretum include:

- American Oil Palm - Elaeis oleifera
- African Oil Palm - Elaeis guineensis
- African Tulip - Spathodea
- Baobab
- Coral Tree
- Guiana Chestnut - Pachira aquatica
- Indian Laurel
- Jacaranda mimosifolia
- Rainbow Eucalyptus
- Sausage tree
- Ylang Ylang
Trees, flowers and plants of the Deerfield Beach Arboretum
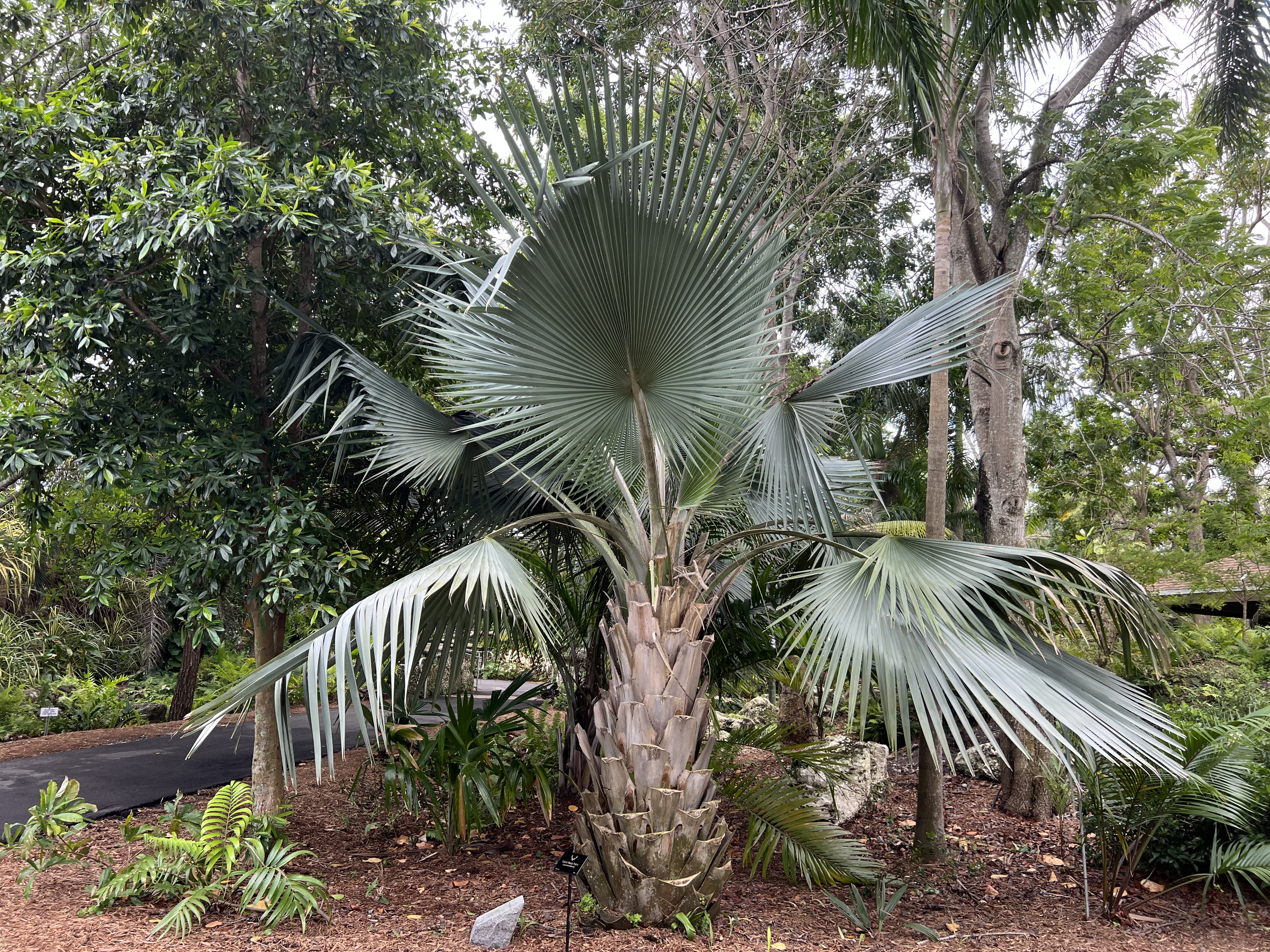
Copernicia fallaensis

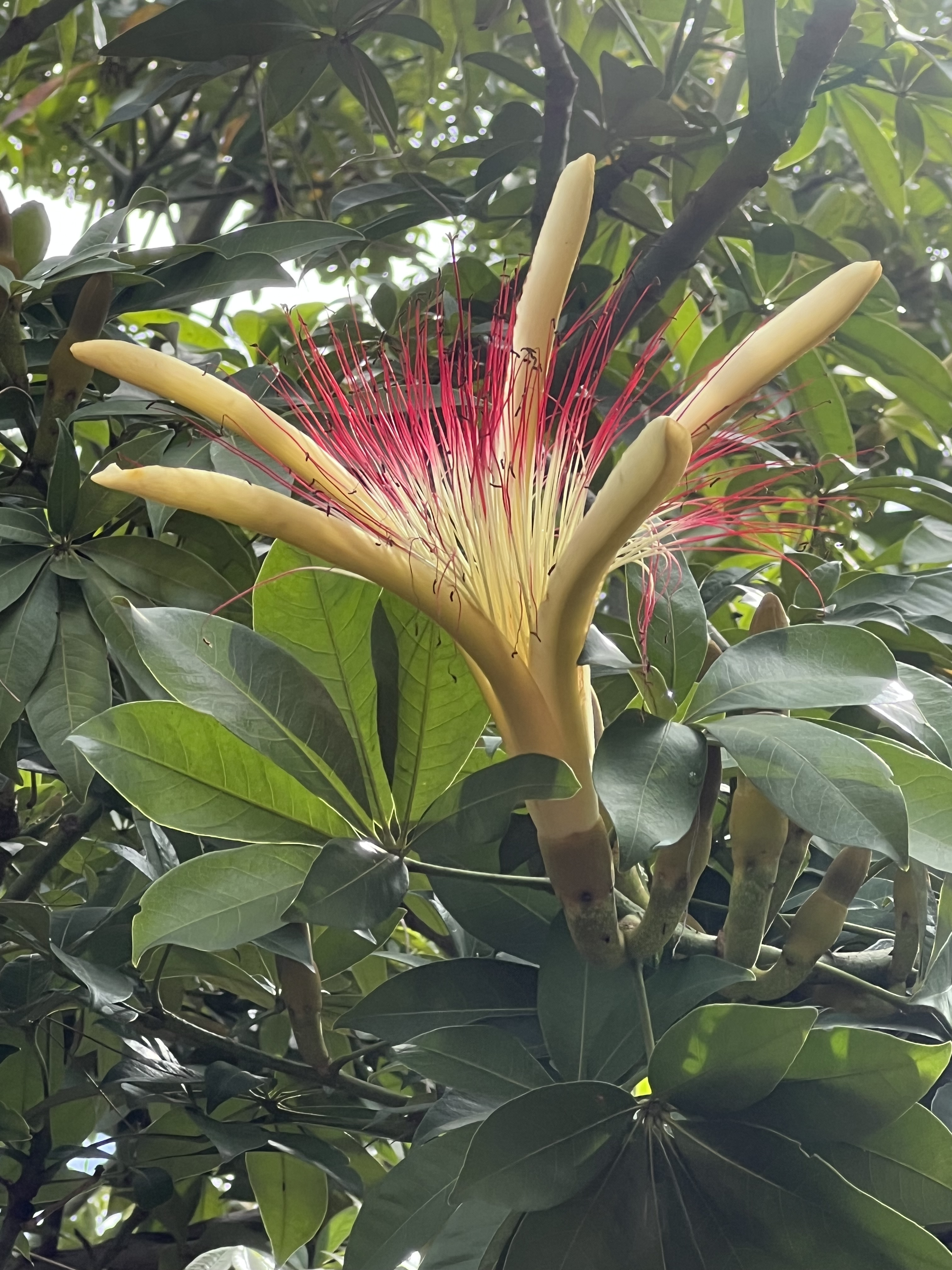
Pachira aquatica with flowers

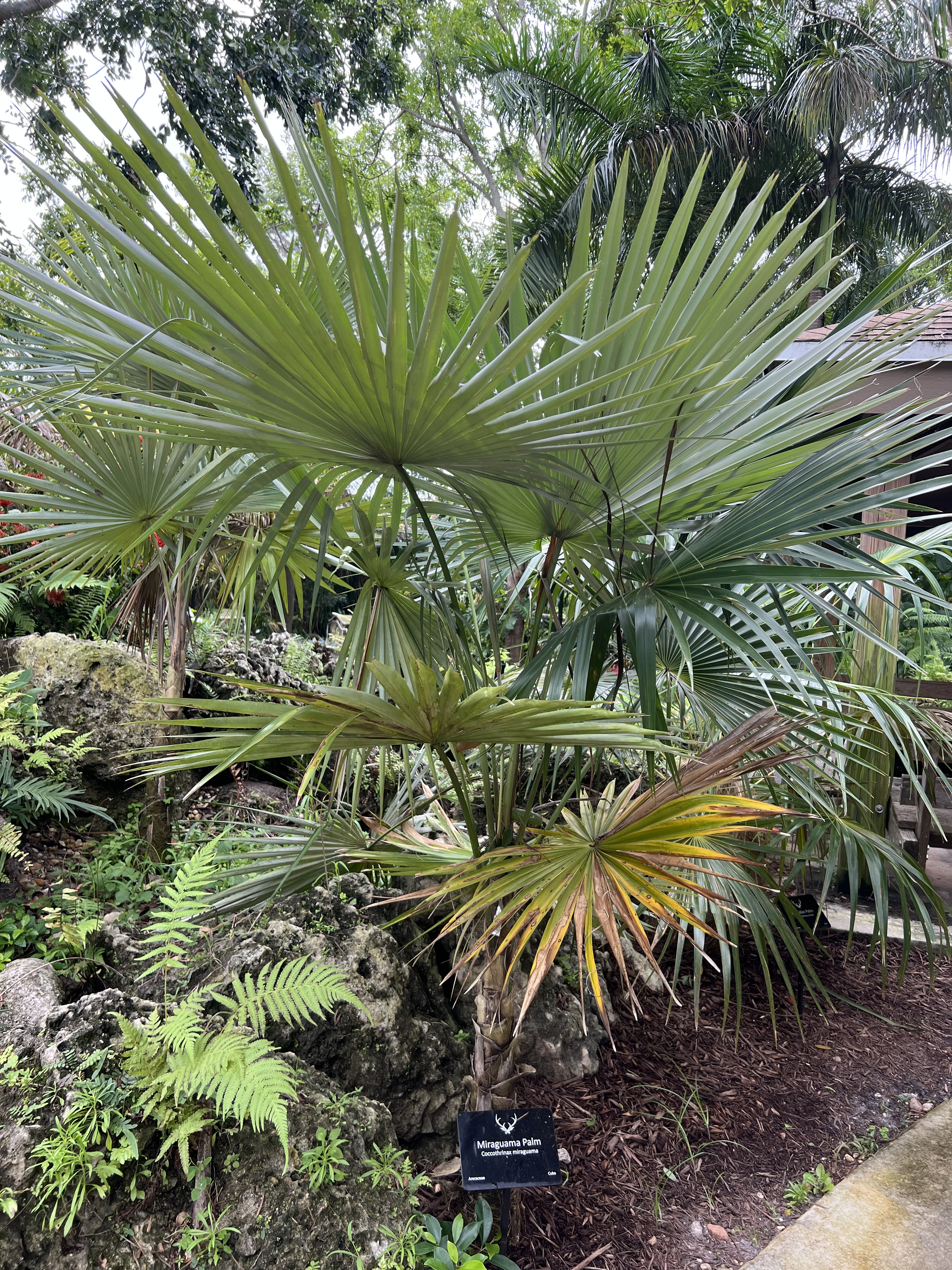
Coccothrinax miraguama

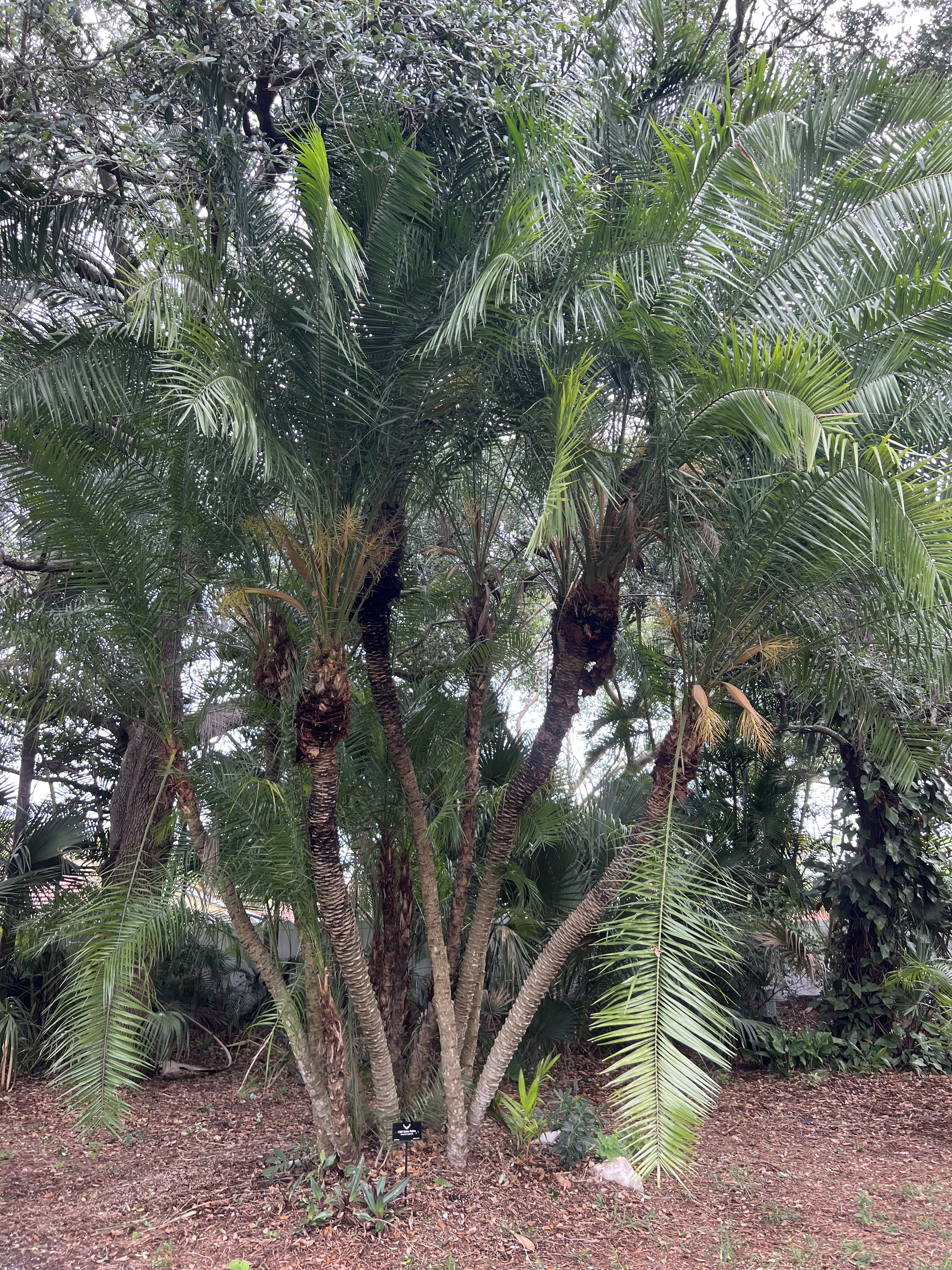
Phoenix rupicola

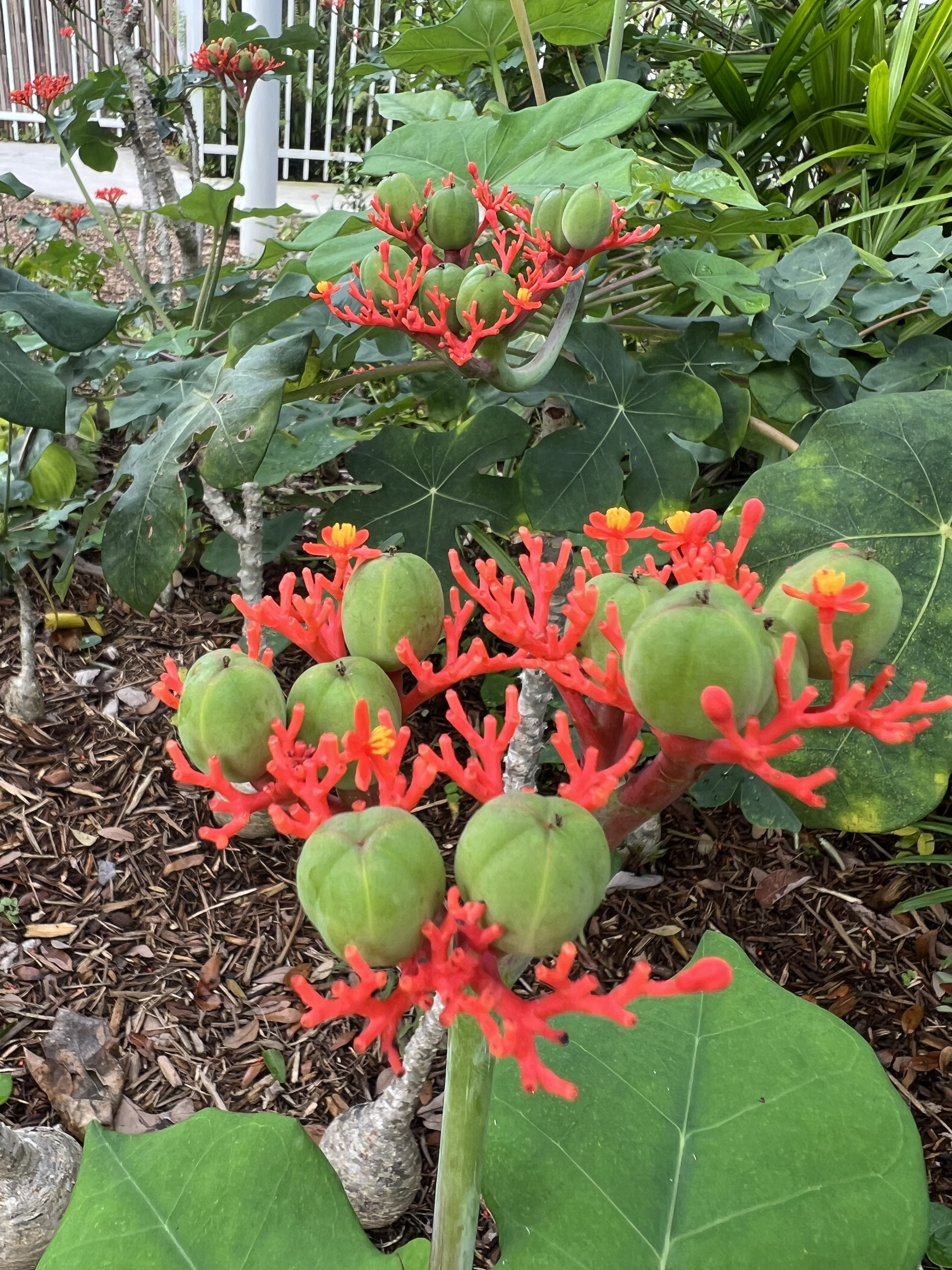
Jatropha podagrica with green fruits

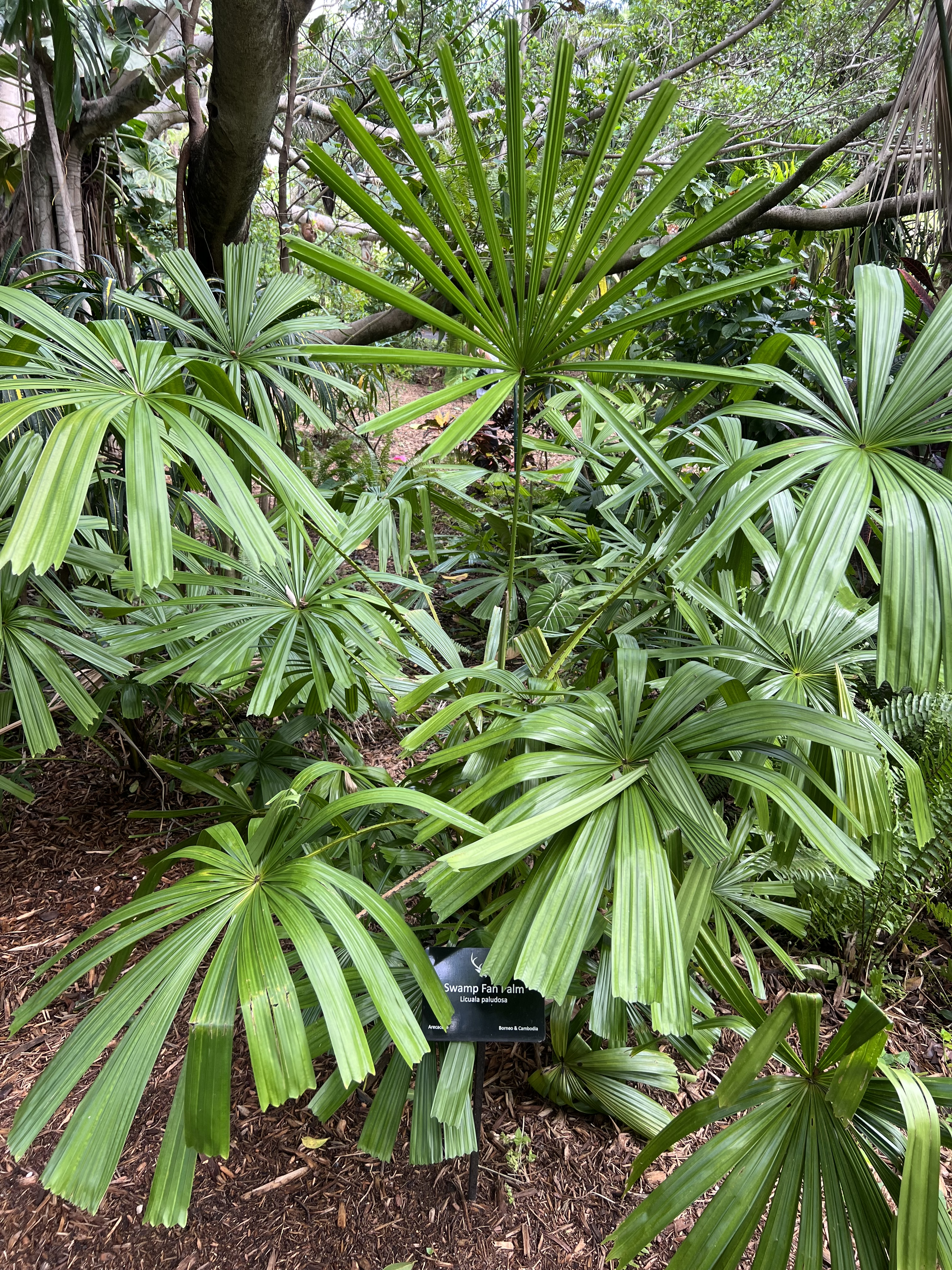
Licuala paludosa

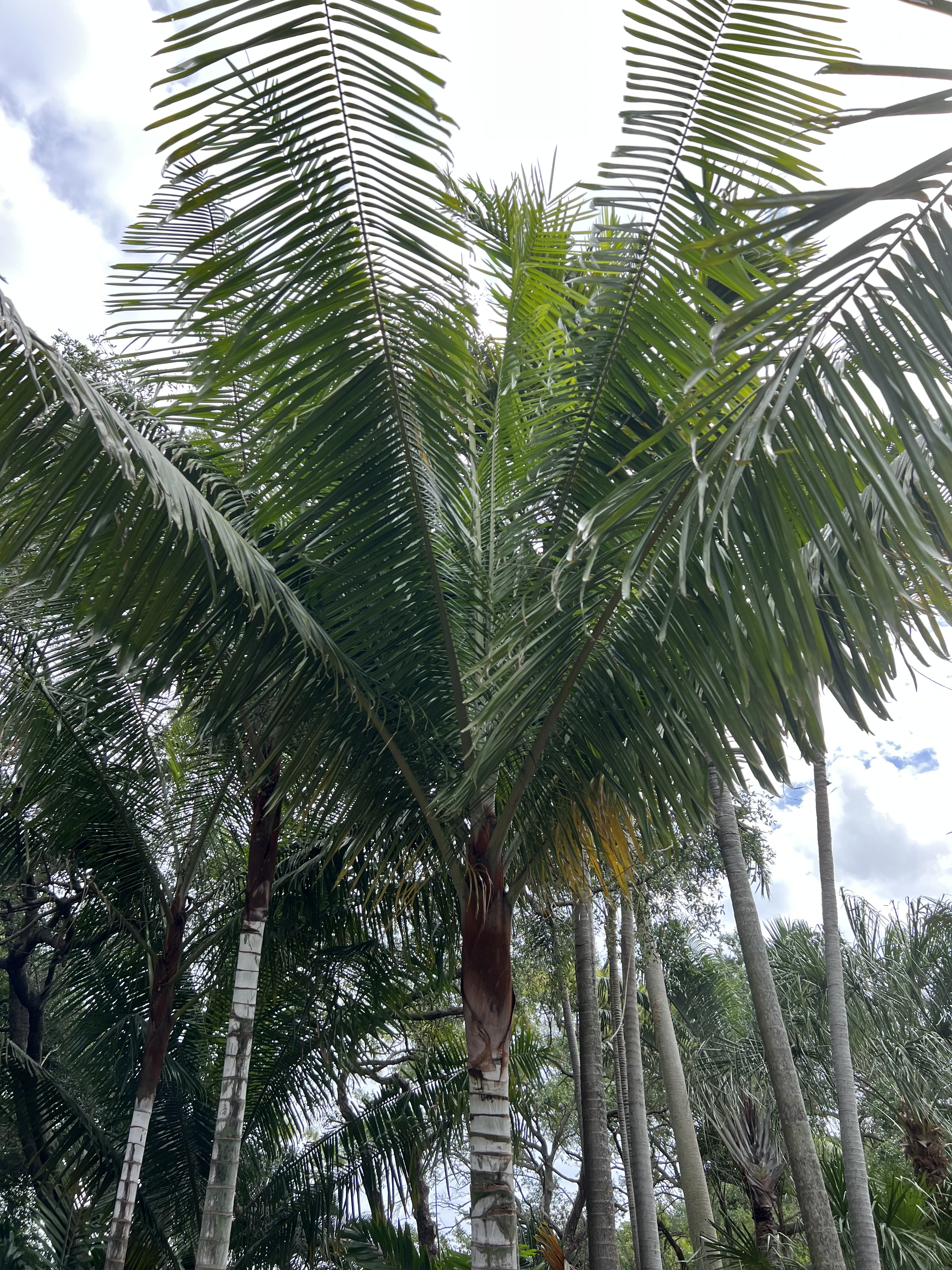
Dypsis lastelliana

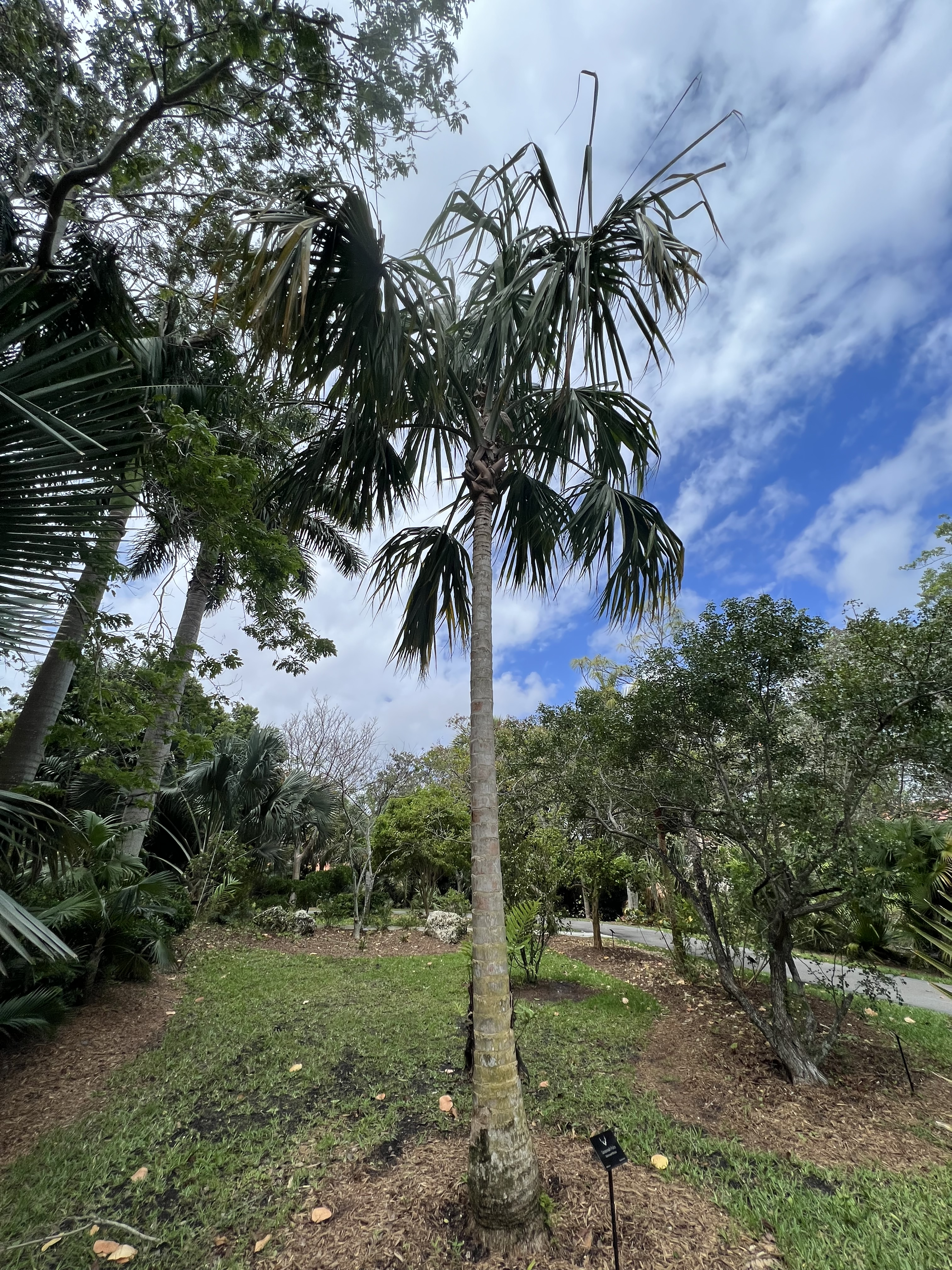
Sabal mauritiiformis

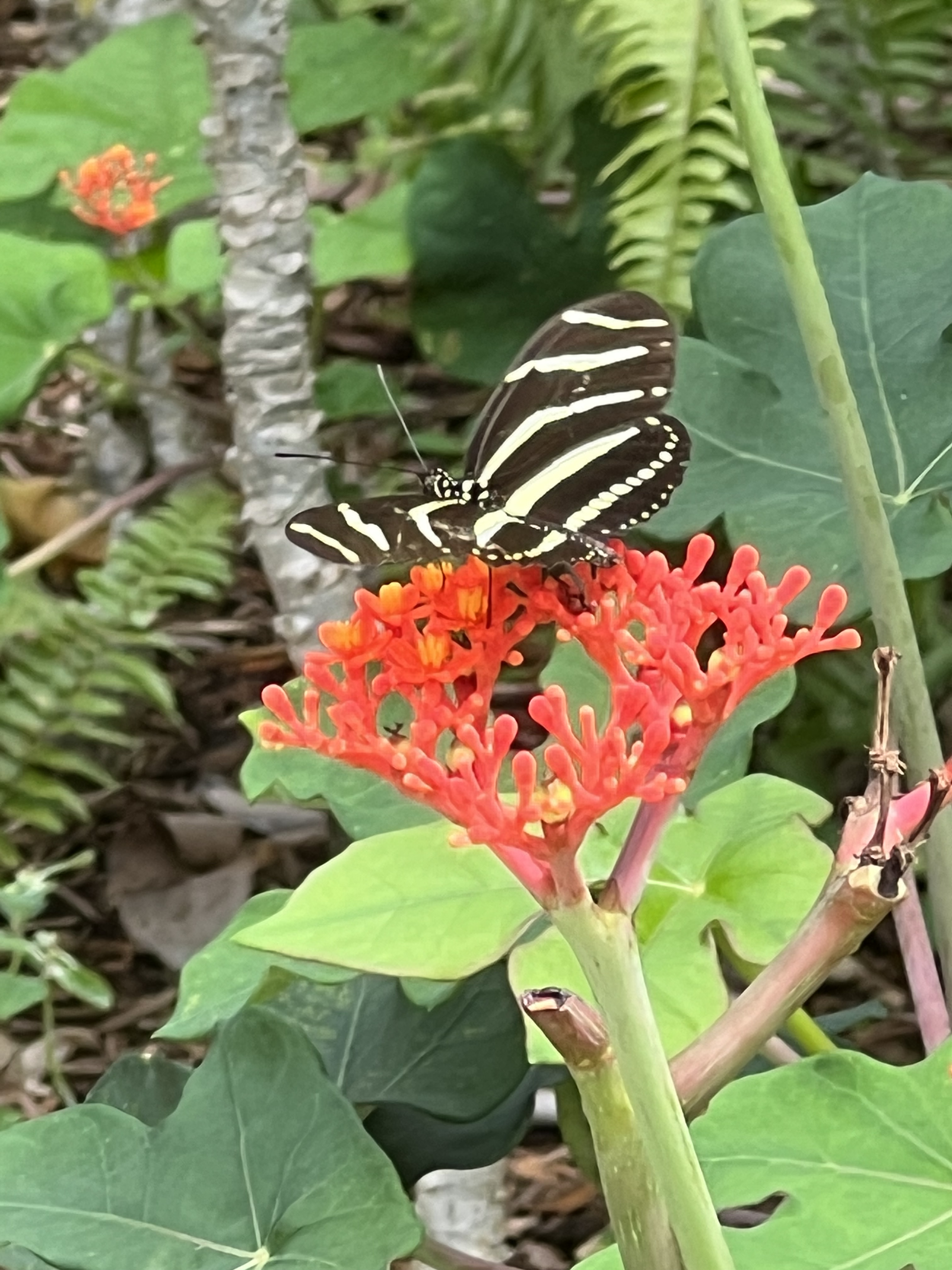
Jatropha podagrica with a zebra longwing butterfly, Heliconius charithonia

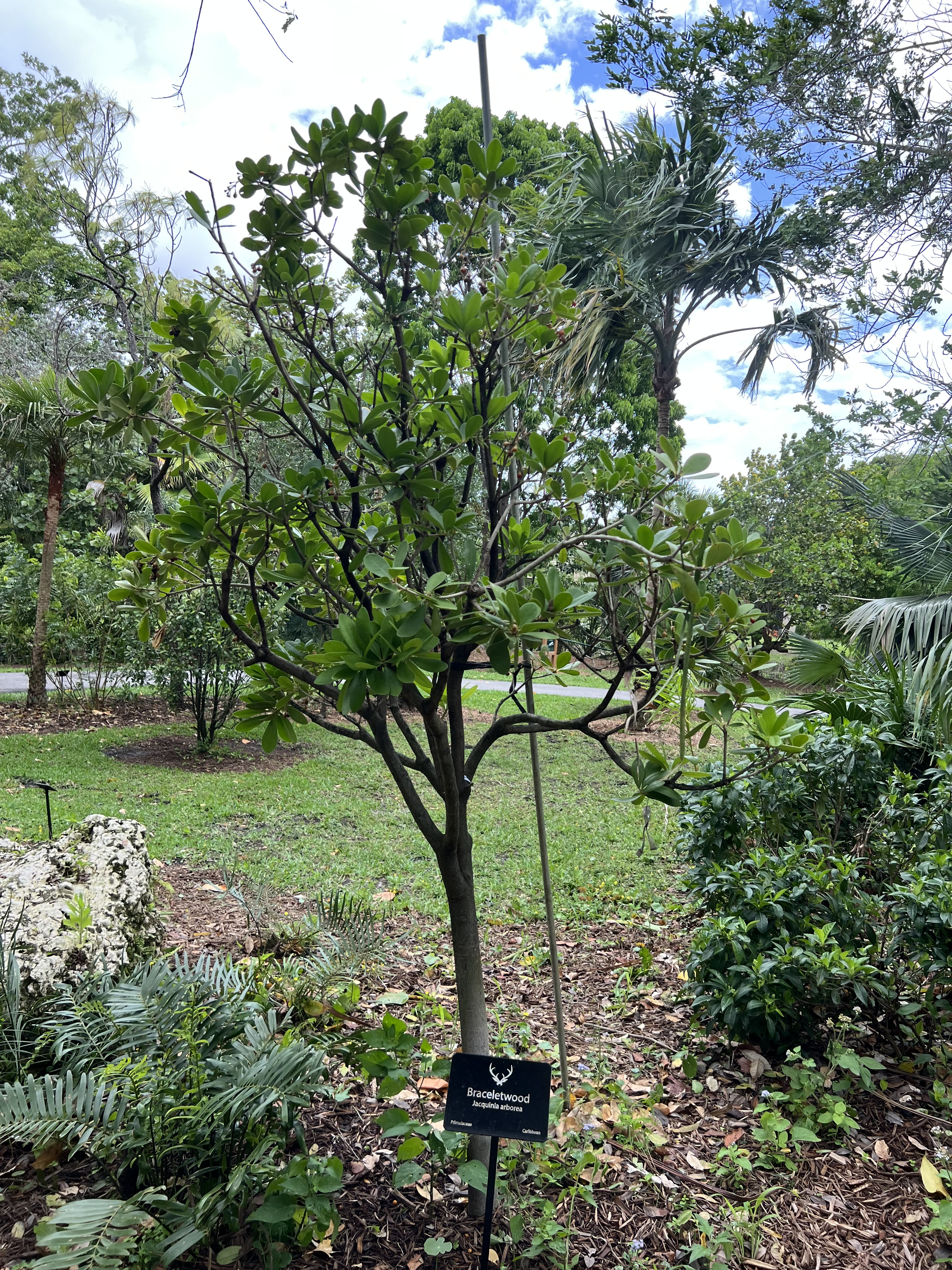
Jacquinia arborea

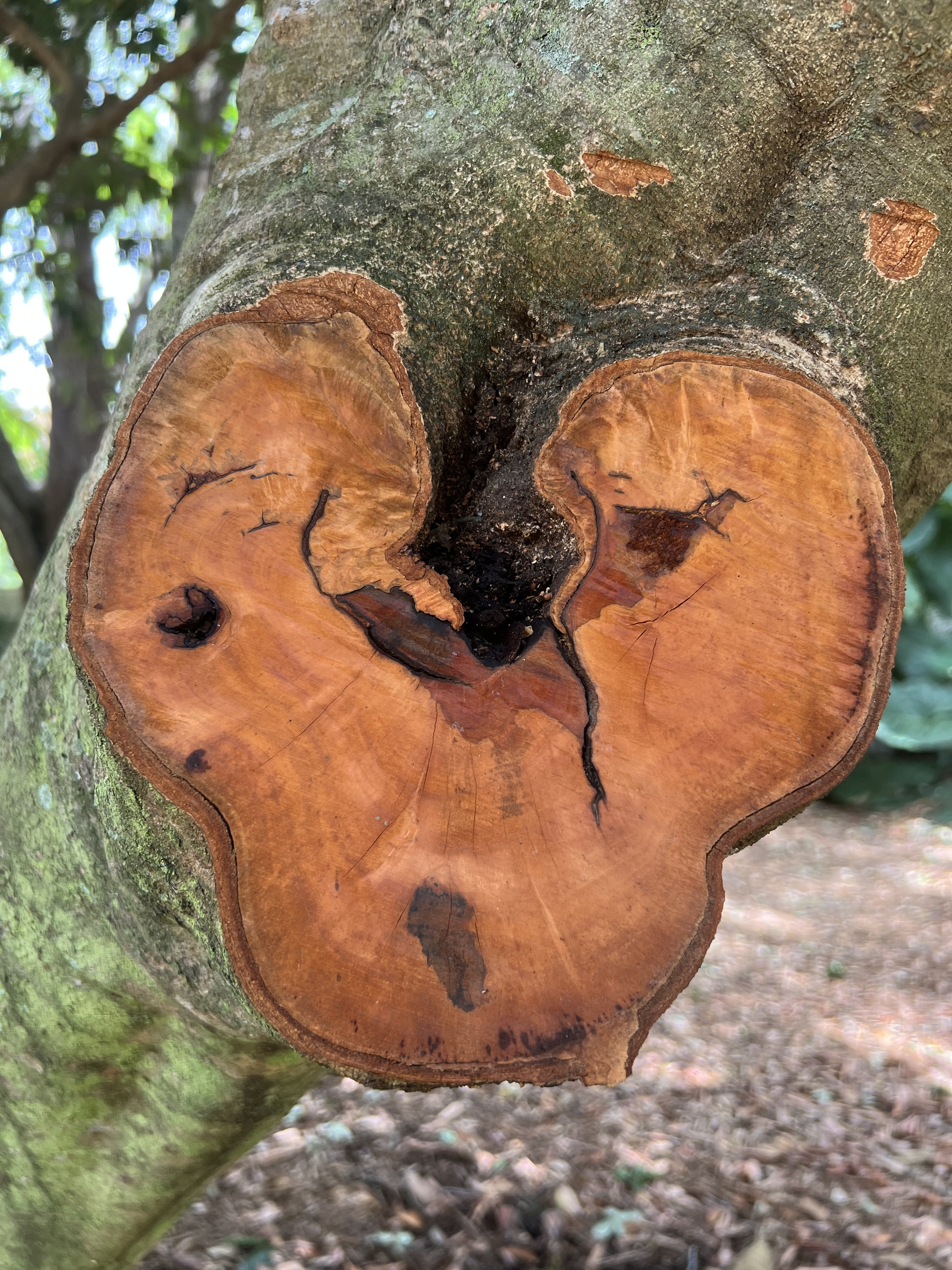
Litchi chinensis, cross-section of wood

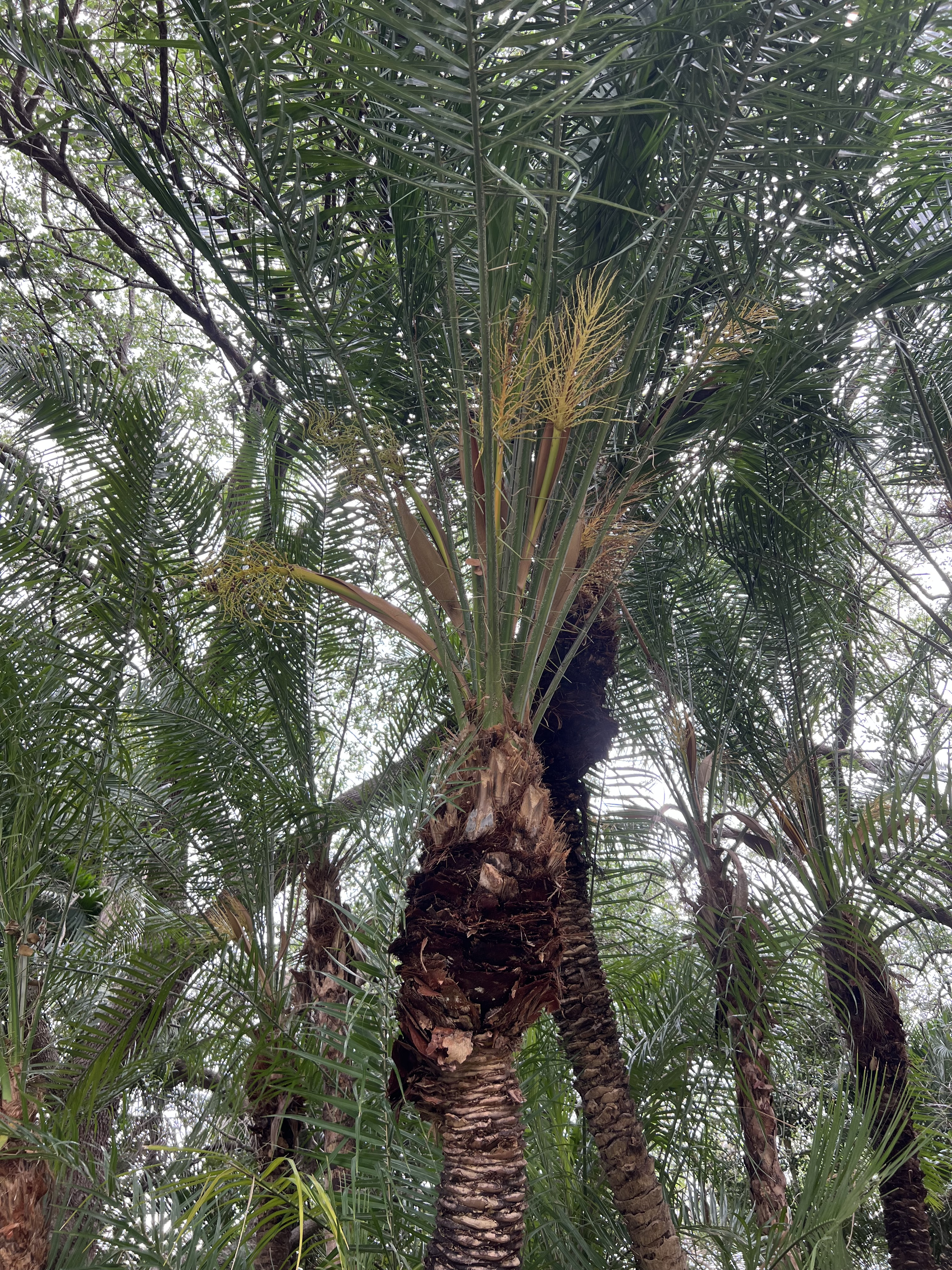
Phoenix rupicola

== See also ==
- List of botanical gardens in the United States
