= Quiet Waters Park =

Park in Florida, United States

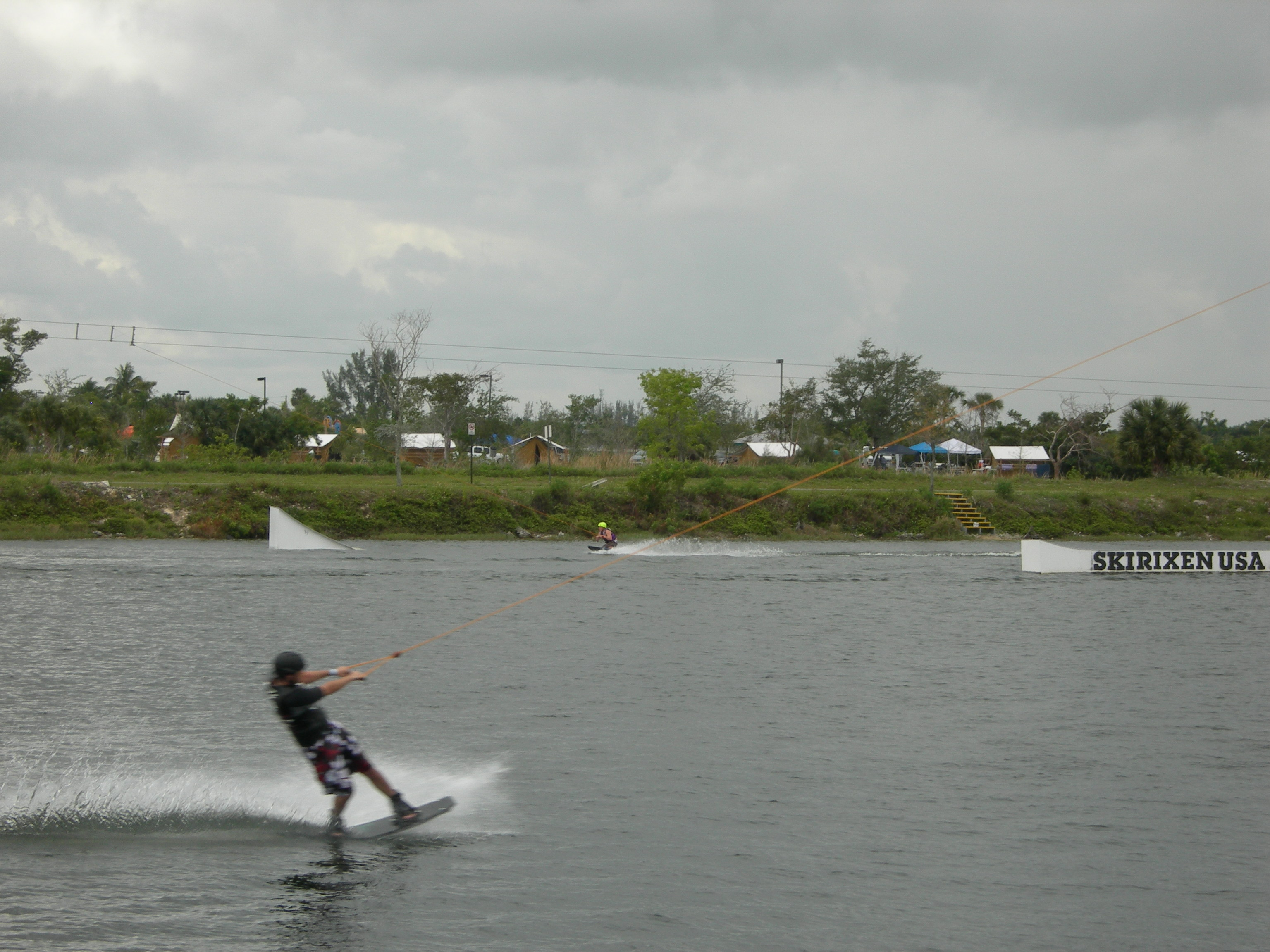
- Waterskiing is one of the activities offered at Quiet Waters Park.

- Location within Florida Location within the United States
- Location: Deerfield Beach, Florida
- Coordinates: 26°18′31″N 80°09′14″W
- Area: 431.4 acres (174.6 ha)
- Website: www.broward.org/parks/quietwaterspark/Pages/Default.aspx

Quiet Waters Park is a 430-acre (1.7 km^{2}) Broward County Park in Deerfield Beach, Florida. Quiet Waters Park is known locally for its annual Renaissance Festival, mountain bike trails, and it's Ski Rixen cable water-skiing system.

== Amenities ==
=== Mountain Bike Trails ===
The park is home to 7 miles of mountain bike trails ranging in difficulty from beginner to expert.

=== Ski Rixen ===
Ski Rixen is one of 79 cable water-ski attractions in the world, and the only wakeboard and water ski resort in South Florida.

=== Other Amenities ===
Quiet Waters also features unique Rent-a-Tent and Tepees, a marina with boats for rent, Woofing Waters dog park, several lakes for fishing, basketball courts, Splash Adventure children's water park that is open seasonally. There are also mountain bike trails and the Eagle's Nest children's open-space playground.
