= YouFit =

American health club chain

YouFit Gyms
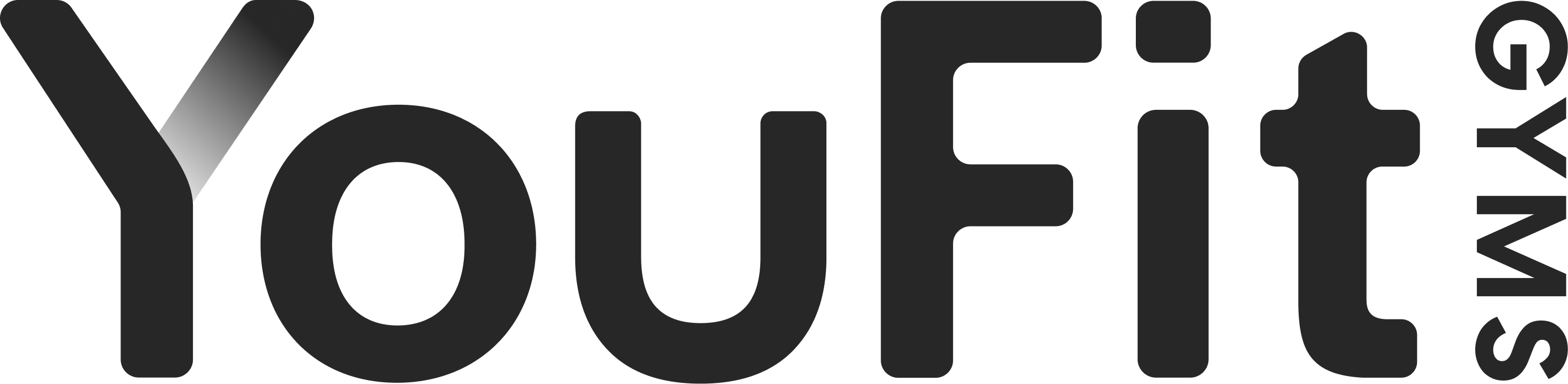
- Company type: Private
- Industry: Health club
- Founded: 2008
- Headquarters: Deerfield Beach, Florida
- Number of locations: 80 in 10 states (2021)
- Area served: 10 states in the United States
- Key people: Brian Vahaly, CEO
- Services: Personal training; Group fitness; Nutritional Services
- Website: www.youfit.com

YouFit Gyms (formerly YouFit Health Clubs) is a national chain of fitness clubs.

== Background ==
YouFit was founded by Rick Berks. The first YouFit, in St. Petersburg, Florida, opened in 2008 and grew to over 100 gyms across the United States. Berks separated from YouFit in May 2020, citing differences with the firm’s financial backers in his resignation letter.

In 2016, YouFit signed a consent order with the Florida Attorney General after receiving excessive amounts of complaints involving allegations of dishonest advertising, improper billing, and abusive collections practices. As of 2023, Youfit is rated F by the better business bureau.

In 2020, YouFit filed for bankruptcy protection for reasons that included several class action lawsuits including allegations of improper charging of customers despite being closed during the pandemic.

In 2021, Brian Vahaly, a private equity executive and former professional tennis player, became CEO of YouFit Gyms. The COVID-19 pandemic had a devastating impact on the fitness industry and Vahaly had guided the chain out of bankruptcy during the pandemic. In October, 2021, YouFit underwent a company-wide rebrand,

== Locations ==
There are currently 80 YouFit Gyms across 10 states. Florida, Arizona, Texas and Georgia have the most locations. YouFit Gyms also has locations in Alabama, Louisiana, Virginia, Rhode Island, Pennsylvania and Maryland.

== Awards ==
YouFit was named "The Best Cheap Gym Membership in 2020".

YouFit Gyms was named "One of the Best Gyms in Baltimore in 2021."

== Services ==
YouFit Gyms offers on-site personal training, nutritional resources through EatLove, and YouFit On Demand, a series of virtual classes created for at-home workouts.
