= Ballard Partners =

American lobbying firm

- Formation: 1998; 28 years ago
- Founder: Brian D. Ballard
- Type: Lobbying firm
- Headquarters: Tallahassee, Florida
- Location: Washington, D.C.
- Region served: United States
- Services: Lobbying, government relations, public affairs
- Key people: Sylvester Lukis, Dan McFaul, Jasmine Zaki (managing partners)
- Revenue: US$88 million (2025)
- Website: ballardpartners.com

Ballard Partners is an American lobbying firm that is noted to for its ties to the Trump administration and has employed Attorney General Pam Bondi and White House Chief of Staff Susie Wiles.

== History ==
Brian D. Ballard and his father-in-law Jim Smith founded the lobbying firm Smith & Ballard in 1998. Ballard previously worked as the chief of staff for Bob Martinez, Governor of Florida, and was later a lobbyist focused on the Florida Legislature. Smith previously served as Secretary of State of Florida. In June 2011, Smith left the firm, which changed its name to Ballard Partners.

Prior to Donald Trump's election win, Ballard Partners was based in Florida. In 2017, they opened a Washington, D.C. office, following Trump's first election victory.

Ballard helped to raise $50 million for Trump's 2024 campaign, including $250,000 that he donated personally.

In 2025, OpenSecrets described it as the top lobbying firm in the country.

=== Florida practice ===
Its Florida practice maintained offices in Tallahassee, Tampa, Orlando, Fort Lauderdale, Coral Gables and Jacksonville, and acted for clients including Google, Uber, Honda and the New York Yankees. The firm represented nearly 100 clients, including U.S. Sugar and the city of Boca Raton, and brought in $1 million in revenue in the first quarter of that year. In the year before the 2016 election it was the highest-grossing lobbying firm in the state, collecting about $20 million from clients. Ballard registered as a Florida lobbyist for The Trump Organization in 2013, after it acquired the Doral golf resort in Miami, and the company paid the firm about $500,000 over the following two years.

=== Washington practice ===
The Washington premises were a few blocks from the White House. Within weeks of opening the office, the firm had more than a dozen clients and generated over $1 million in revenue in its first three months. Within five months, it had registered 35 federal clients, most of which had not previously retained it, and had generated close to $4 million in current and contracted business. By early 2018, it had signed more than 60 clients since opening, earning nearly $10 million for the year, in addition to $3.1 million from foreign clients.

The firm initially leased space on the second floor of the Homer Building and moved to larger premises on the fourth floor in February 2018 to accommodate additional staff. In the fourth quarter of 2017, it reported $3.6 million in revenue, ranking seventeenth among Washington lobbying firms, while employing six registered lobbyists on domestic work – about half the number at the firm immediately above it in the rankings. It lobbied nearly two dozen federal agencies as well as the White House, the office of the vice president and Congress.

By February 2019, the firm had taken on more than 100 domestic and foreign clients and collected more than $28 million since the 2016 election. Reported fees reached $19.1 million in 2019, excluding work for foreign governments, and $24.6 million in 2020, when it was the fifth highest-grossing firm in Washington. It led the industry in new client registrations in 2018, 2019 and 2020, signing 145 in the last of those years against 104 for its closest competitor.

By October 2020, the firm had collected close to $75 million in fees since opening in Washington while employing fewer than a dozen lobbyists, making it the seventh largest shop in the city by revenue. A Wall Street Journal analysis of disclosure filings found that its lobbyists each generated an average of $1.7 million in revenue, compared with an industry average of roughly $300,000; Ballard attributed the ratio to the firm's use of consultants. Ballard was personally registered to represent 122 clients on more than 300 policy matters, more than any other registered lobbyist in Washington.

During the COVID-19 pandemic, the firm took on clients seeking regulatory approvals or federal relief funds, among them a disinfectant manufacturer, a commercial laundry supplier and a health technology company. In June 2020, it withdrew from a contract with the District of Columbia, which had engaged it to pursue pandemic relief funding, amid a dispute between the mayor and the president over the federal response to protests in the city.

Following the 2020 election, Ballard said the firm did not expect to sustain its earlier growth, and that month it hired a Democratic fundraiser to expand its work with that party.

=== Expansion after 2024 ===
The firm signed more than 200 new clients following the 2024 election. In the second quarter of 2025 it recorded higher lobbying revenue than any other firm in Washington for the first time, displacing Brownstein Hyatt Farber Schreck. By early September 2025 it had generated more than $30 million during the year and acted for close to 300 clients. Its reported revenue for 2025 exceeded $88 million, a rise of more than 350 percent on the previous year. Ballard said that his intention was to build a bipartisan firm that would outlast the Trump administration.

Reported fees from individual clients in 2025 included $1.7 million from the Albanian oil and gas company Balkan Energy, the firm's largest account that year, $1.2 million each from Korea Zinc and an investment fund established with Saudi Arabia, $900,000 paid by lawyers acting for a cryptocurrency investor, $770,000 from TotalEnergies in connection with a liquefied natural gas project in Mozambique and $600,000 from TikTok. Harvard University disclosed its engagement of the firm eleven days before the second inauguration; the university had spent $720,000 on federal lobbying in 2024 and $340,000 in the first quarter of 2025, a quarter of which went to Ballard Partners, and it was the only leading university to retain the firm during its dispute with the administration. In April 2026 the artificial intelligence company Anthropic retained the firm to work on procurement matters at the Department of Defense, days after the department designated the company a supply chain risk.

== Foreign lobbying ==
Work for foreign principals formed a substantial part of the firm's business from the outset. By mid-2017, contracts with three foreign principals were collectively worth more than $2.6 million a year, and by March 2019 the firm had earned more than $7.2 million from foreign interests since the inauguration, against roughly $28 million from domestic federal clients over the same period. Work for the Socialist Party of Albania ran for twelve months at $20,000 per month and covered advocacy and communications advice on the party's dealings with American officials.

The firm signed a contract with the Turkish government worth $125,000 a month in May 2017. Robert Wexler, a former Democratic congressman hired that year, led the account and the firm became involved in the case of the American pastor Andrew Brunson, who had been detained in Turkey since 2016; in meetings with Turkish officials, the firm's lobbyists argued that a prisoner exchange was unacceptable and that Brunson's release was essential to improving relations. He was freed in October 2018. Turkey and the state-owned bank Halkbank together paid the firm $5 million from 2017 onwards. In 2018, the firm lobbied the White House in an effort to avert an indictment of Halkbank over the evasion of sanctions on Iran, and it ended the representation once charges were brought. Disclosures reviewed in early 2019 recorded roughly $1.9 million from Turkey since 2017 and at least $2 million from Halkbank, $1.2 million from the Dominican Republic over two years and $175,000 from Qatar in 2018, together with a contract worth $1.1 million signed in September 2018 with the Peoples Democratic Party of Nigeria.

The firm collected $1.2 million from Kosovo from December 2017 onwards. Ballard raised the Kosovan ambassador's request for a meeting with Trump directly with the president, an approach he later said obliged him to file a disclosure; the meeting did not take place. In February 2019 the foreign minister of Zimbabwe signed a contract worth $500,000 a year, the country's first engagement of an American lobbying firm in more than a decade, under which the firm undertook to encourage a reassessment of the country by the State Department; the agreement was criticized by two former American ambassadors to the region, while James Rubin, the lobbyist leading the account, said the firm had considered the decision carefully and regarded the post-Mugabe government as a significant improvement.

In 2018 the firm acted for Moïse Katumbi, an exiled opposition figure from the Democratic Republic of the Congo, and met a deputy to the American ambassador to the United Nations on his behalf. It declined an approach from representatives of the Congolese government under Joseph Kabila. The firm began working for the country in 2022, and on the day of the second inauguration it signed a new agreement with the Congolese ministry of communication and media that raised its monthly retainer from $75,000 to $100,000.

In March 2018 the firm disclosed ASM International General Trading, a Dubai-based trading company, as a client, registering under the Lobbying Disclosure Act rather than the Foreign Agents Registration Act (FARA), which imposes stricter requirements. The Daily Beast reported that the company was connected to a Syrian business family said to have links to the government of Bashar al-Assad; Ballard said his team had been unaware of the background and the firm ended the representation. Lydia Dennett of the Project on Government Oversight said the exemption permitting firms acting for foreign companies to avoid FARA registration had been open to misuse where the ultimate beneficiary was a foreign state. The Office of Foreign Assets Control imposed sanctions on the company and the family in June 2019.

The firm also reported $100,000 in 2018 for work on behalf of REC Americas, a solar energy company it described as Norwegian-owned, without recording that the parent was a subsidiary of the Chinese state-owned ChemChina. After inquiries from Mother Jones it filed an amendment some two years after the work was completed listing ChemChina and the Chinese state as interested foreign entities; a lawyer handling the firm's compliance said the omission had been inadvertent. The firm separately ended its work for a subsidiary of the Venezuelan broadcaster Globovisión after learning of a criminal investigation into the station's owner.

A review of disclosures published in March 2025 identified at least fifteen foreign principals signed since the November 2024 election, including corporations owned wholly or partly in Canada, Germany, France, Singapore, India, Italy and Switzerland. Shortly before polling day the firm had agreed to represent the government of Sudan for an initial $300,000 and $50,000 a month thereafter. Asked about its client Pirelli Tire, whose largest shareholder is a Chinese state-owned chemical company, a spokesperson said that Italian rules restricted the shareholder's influence and that the firm would act for companies subject to such restrictions. It has registered under FARA for the governments of the Democratic Republic of the Congo, Japan and Saudi Arabia, earning between $1 million and $2 million a year; a contract signed with the Saudi embassy in March 2025 provided for $60,000 a month over one year, and in November 2025 it agreed to represent Uzbekistan's national oil and gas company for $1 million a year for up to five years.

== Clients ==
- Abbott Laboratories
- Accenture
- Advance Financial
- Alexander von Furstenberg Family
- Alkermes plc
- Amazon.com
- AMD
- American Academy of Ophthalmology
- American Express
- American Health Care Association
- American Hospital Association
- Anti-Defamation League
- Apotex Inc.
- Atlas Air Worldwide
- Axel Springer SE
- Bayer
- bioMérieux
- Bloom Energy
- Blue Origin
- BMW
- Booz Allen Hamilton
- British American Tobacco
- Broward County, Florida
- Business Roundtable
- ByteDance
- California Avocado Commission
- CARE International
- Carnival Cruise Line
- Chevron Corp
- Citizens for Responsible Energy Solutions
- City of Debary, Florida
- City of Largo, Florida
- City of Miami Beach, Florida
- City of Pensacola, Florida
- City of Winter Haven, Florida
- Comcast
- Computer & Communications Industry Association
- Constellation Energy
- Deutsche Telekom
- Dole plc
- Douglas County, Washington
- Equinix
- Florida A&M University
- Florida College System
- Florida Sheriffs Association
- Gadsden County, Florida
- General Motors
- Genmab
- GEO Group
- Government of the Dominican Republic
- Government of Guatemala
- Government of Japan
- Government of Liberia
- Government of Kosovo
- Government of Mali
- Government of Turkey
- Group of Seven
- Halkbank
- Harvard University
- Hyperice
- International Olympic Committee
- Irving Oil
- Jabil
- Jackson Health System
- Jacksonville Electric Authority
- Jacksonville Port Authority
- Jacksonville Transportation Authority
- JPMorgan
- Kirkland & Ellis
- L3Harris Technologies
- Lee County, Florida
- Lenovo
- Leonardo S.p.A.
- Logistics Management Institute
- Maldives Marketing and Public Relations Corporation
- Manatee County, Florida
- Martin County, Florida
- Maxell
- Mercedes-Benz Group
- Miami-Dade County, Florida
- Miami-Dade County Public Schools
- Ministry of Communication and Medias of the Democratic Republic of Congo
- Minister of Foreign Affairs of the Republic of Zimbabwe
- Mitsubishi Corporation
- Major League Baseball
- Moore Capital Management
- Mosaic Company
- Motion Picture Association
- Mount Sinai Medical Center
- Netflix
- New College Foundation
- New York Stock Exchange
- NextEra Energy
- National Football League
- Novavax
- Nippon Steel
- Novo Nordisk
- Okaloosa County, Florida
- Palantir Technologies
- Paragon Systems
- Pasco County, Florida
- Paramount Global
- PAX Technology
- Pernod Ricard
- Peoples Democratic Party of Nigeria
- PBS
- Publix Super Markets
- Radius Recycling
- Reliance Industries
- Reyes Holdings
- Ripple Labs
- Robinhood Markets
- Rolls-Royce Holdings
- SAP SE
- Seminole Tribe of Florida
- ServiceNow
- Shein
- Simpson, Thacher & Bartlett
- Southern Glazer's Wine & Spirits
- Standard Industries
- State University System of Florida
- SharkNinja
- Simon Wiesenthal Center
- Suffolk Construction
- Teradyne
- TotalEnergies
- Toy Association
- Uber
- UG Solutions
- UN High Commissioner for Refugees
- Union of Orthodox Jewish Congregations of America
- United Airlines Holdings
- UnitedHealth Group
- University of Florida Health
- University of Miami
- University of Michigan
- University of Washington
- UpToDate Inc
- US Sugar
- Qatar
- Vanderbilt University
- Walgreens Boots Alliance
- Walt Disney Co.
- Walton County, Florida
- Zscaler

== People ==
- Amaryllis Fox Kennedy
- Ana Cruz
- Dane Eagle
- Eugene O'Flaherty
- Jeff Atwater
- Jeff Miller
- Joe Buscaino
- José Félix Díaz
- Lai Mohammed
- Lenny Curry
- Matthew Bryza
- Michael LaRosa
- Pam Bondi
- Robert Wexler
- Susie Wiles
