= Steven L. Abrams =

American politician (born 1958)

Steven Abrams
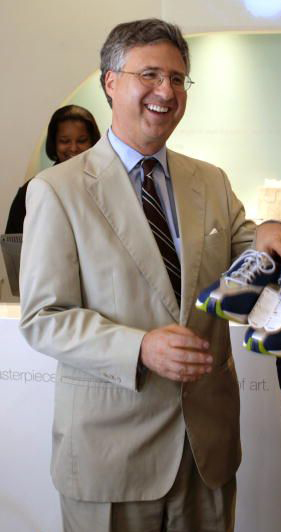

Member of the Palm Beach County Commission from the 4th district
- In office March 2009 – January 2019
- Preceded by: Mary McCarty
- Succeeded by: Robert S. Weinroth

Mayor of Boca Raton, Florida
- In office April 2001 – April 2008
- Preceded by: Carol Hanson
- Succeeded by: Susan Whelchel

Personal details
- Born: Steven Leon Abrams; 1958 (age 67–68) Des Moines, Iowa, U.S.
- Party: Republican
- Education: Harvard University (BA); George Washington University (JD)

Steven L. Abrams (born 1958) is an American politician. He was the first mayor of Palm Beach County in the U.S. state of Florida. He previously served as chairman of the Palm Beach County Board of County Commissioners and represented District 4 on the county commission. Abrams formerly served as chairman and executive director of the South Florida Regional Transportation Authority. He is the former mayor of the City of Boca Raton, Florida.

A lawyer, he was elected mayor in March 2001 and re-elected in 2003 and 2005. He previously served as a city council member from 1989 to 1999. In March 2009, Abrams was appointed by then-Florida governor Charlie Crist to occupy the district four county commission seat vacated by Mary McCarty after her resignation due to federal corruption charges. He won election to a full term when no one filed to run against him in 2010. Abrams received his bachelor's degree from Harvard University in Government in 1980 and his J.D. degree from The George Washington University in 1985. His past experience includes law clerk in the White House under President Ronald Reagan. He was a partner of the now defunct Rothstein Rosenfeldt Adler firm.

== Sources ==
- Gov. Crist names Boca Raton's former mayor to replace Mary McCarty, cbs12.com. Accessed August 14, 2009.
