= Advance Financial =

High-interest payday lender

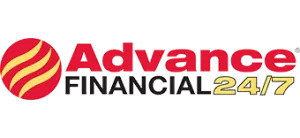

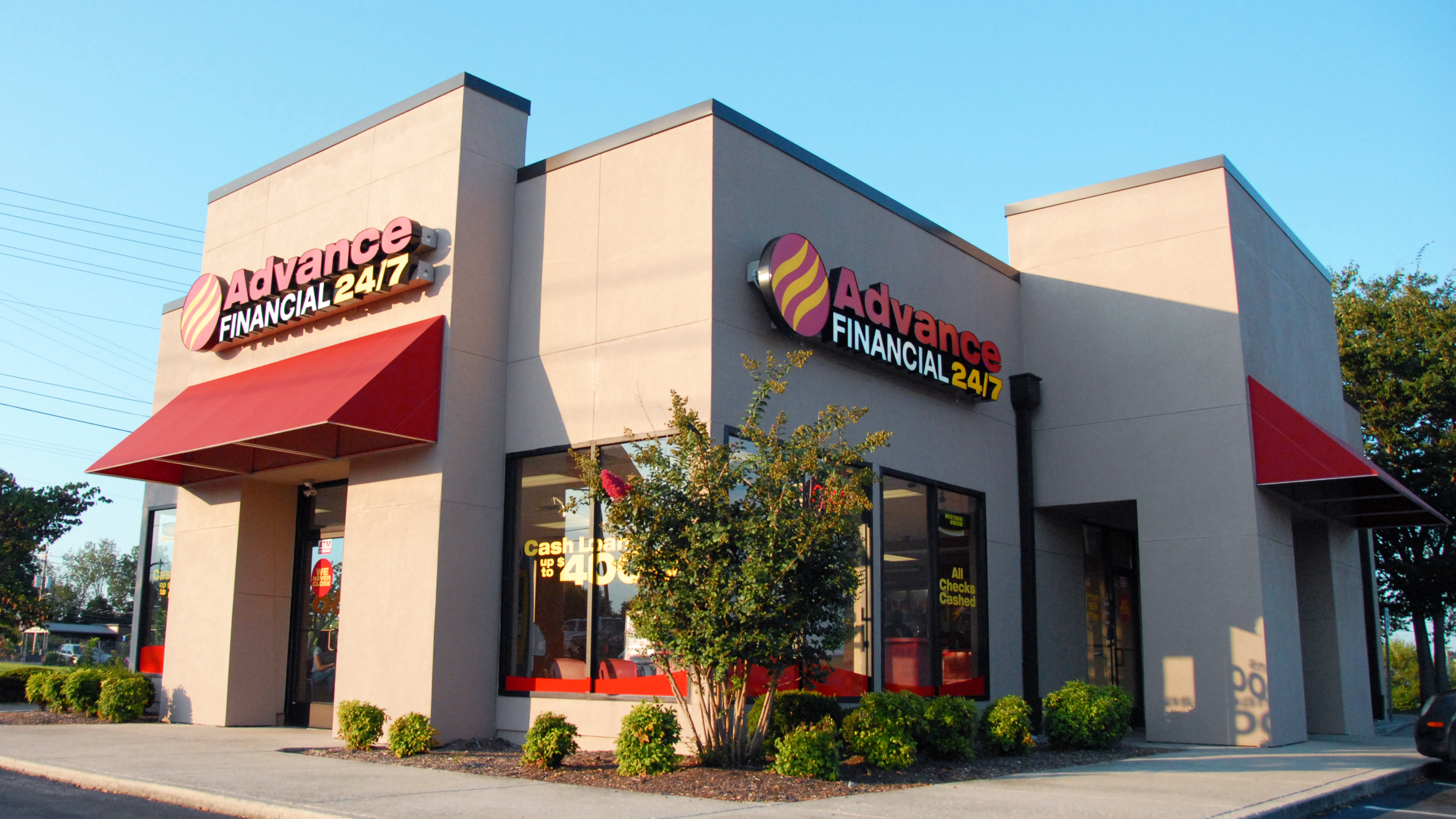
- Advance Financial Store
- Type: Privately Held Company
- Industry: Payday loans
- Founded: 1996
- Headquarters: Nashville, Tennessee, United States
- Area served: United States
- Key people: Michael Hodges (chairman); Tina Hodges (CEO)
- Parent: Harpeth Financial Services, LLC
- Website: Official website

Advance Financial is a high-interest payday lender based in Nashville, Tennessee. It was founded in 1996 by Michael "Mike" and Tina Hodges who serve as chairman and CEO respectively.

The company offers high-interest payday loans, so-called "Flex Loans", offering up to $4,000 at 279.5% interest. The company has filed over 110,000 lawsuits against its borrowers, significantly more than any other payday lender. The company is one of the top campaign donors in Tennessee, lobbying regulators to loosen restrictions on payday loan activities.

Some of Advance Financial's offerings, including payday loans, have been described as "exploitative financial products to the working poor," since the short-term loans carry annual interest of up to 450%.

== History ==
The company, then-called Advance Pay Day, was established by Michael and Tina Hodges in Nashville, Tennessee in the 1990s, offering payday loans. By 2010, Advance had approximately two dozen stores and generated $15 million in revenue.

After the creation of the Consumer Financial Protection Bureau in 2011, which sought to limit predatory payday loan practices, Advance created a political action committee and hired lobbyists to influence Tennessee politicians. The company has spent more than $3 million on lobbying. Tennessee legislators subsequently passed a bill, signed into law by Governor Bill Haslam, to loosen restrictions on high-interest payday lenders. Cameron Sexton, the bill's sponsor, described its effect as positive due to a requirement to pay down the principal every month. Before, payday lenders such as Advance could only lend up to $425 and the borrower could not be required to pay back more than $500. With the elimination of these protections and the introduction of Advance's "Flex Loans" in 2015, these limits rose to $4,000 and over $10,000 respectively. Following this, Advance's business boomed, with the company expanding to 105 locations by the end of the 2010s. By 2019, the company self-reported earnings of $392 million. The Flex Loan eventually replaced all other products of the company and is, as of 2025, Advance Financial's only product.

When regulators in Virginia noticed Advance filing thousands of lawsuits against its borrowers, an investigation by the state's attorney general's office was kicked off in 2020, ultimately resulting in them labeling the company as "predatory".

== Donations and foundation ==
Mike and Tina Hodges are closely affiliated with the Republican Party, especially Donald Trump and his affiliates, having donated for many individual campaigns as well as to the Republican National Committee. The Hodges have donated over $3 million to Donald Trump's presidential campaigns. In a 2019 recording uncovered by The Washington Post, Michael Hodges said those donations gave him "better access to Trump". In 2020, the Trump administration appointed a new head of the Consumer Financial Protection Bureau who rescinded many payday loan regulations. After hosting a fundraising event for then-Vice President Mike Pence in 2019, the Hodges co-hosted a similar event in 2024 for Trump's running mate and eventual Vice President JD Vance. Another recipient of the Hodges donations is Cameron Sexton, the sponsor of the bill that made the proposed Flex Loan legal in 2014. Since then he has received over $105,000 in campaign donations from Advance Financial and it's affiliated PACs.

In October 2019 the Hodges launched the Hodges Foundation for Philosophical Orientation inspired by the writings of German philosopher Werner Stegmaier, especially his interpretation of Friedrich Nietzsche.

== Associations ==
Advance Financial is a member of several trade organizations including Community Financial Services Association of America, Financial Service Centers of America where the founders, Mike and Tina Hodges serve on the board of directors and Online Lenders Alliance.
