= Therese Meers =

American attorney

- Official portrait, 2022

General Counsel of the Small Business Administration
- In office November 2022 – January 2025
- President: Joe Biden

Personal details
- Spouse: Hugh Meers (m. 2014)
- Education: Duke University (BA); Harvard Law School (JD); University of St. Andrews (MLitt)

Therese Marie Meers (née Rohrbeck) is an American attorney who previously served as General Counsel of the Small Business Administration from 2021 to 2025.

== Education ==
Meers earned a Bachelor of Arts in Art History at Duke University magna cum laude, a Master of Letters at the University of St.Andrews, and a Juris Doctor from Harvard Law School.

== Career ==
Prior to entering government service, Meers was formerly an associate at a law firm in 2008 and received a clinical fellowship at the Harvard Law Transactional Law Clinics. Meers would go on to serve as first, Counsel, and subsequently Senior Counsel for the United States Senate Committee on Small Business & Entrepreneurship for Chair Ben Cardin of Maryland from 2018 to 2021. Meers was also appointed by the Biden Administration as Deputy Associate Administrator of the Office of Capital Access of the Small Businesses Administration, where she facilitated various aid through legislation including the Coronavirus Aid, Relief, and Economic Security Act (CARES Act), Paycheck Protection Program and Health Care Enhancement Act, and the American Rescue Plan Act of 2021.

As General Counsel of the Small Business Administration, Meers' tenure included several significant cases combatting fraud related to COVID-19 relief loans. Such cases included settlements involving Paragon Systems, Valley National Bank, and Kabbage over alleged misconduct tied to the Paycheck Protection Program (PPP).

== Personal Life ==
In 2015, Meers and her husband co-founded Saga Dairy Inc., a company specializing in Icelandic yogurt.
