= Susie Wiles =

American lobbyist and political consultant (born 1957)

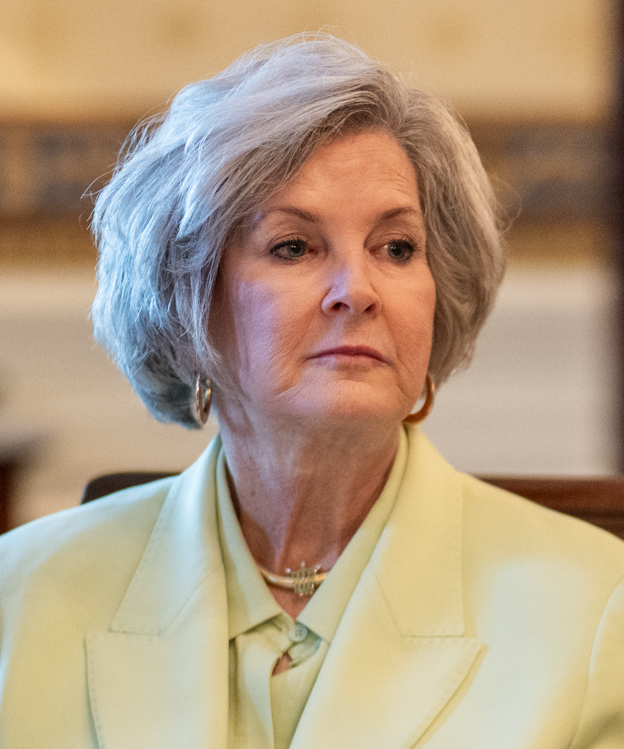
- Wiles in 2025

32nd White House Chief of Staff
- In office January 20, 2025 – November 6, 2026
- President: Donald Trump
- Deputy: Dan Scavino (principal)
- Preceded by: Jeff Zients
- Succeeded by: Stephen Miller

Chief of Staff to the Mayor of Jacksonville
- In office November 20, 1997 – November 17, 2000
- Mayor: John Delaney
- Preceded by: Rick Mullaney
- Succeeded by: Audrey McKibbin Moran

Personal details
- Born: Susan Summerall; May 14, 1957 (age 69) Lake City, Florida, U.S.
- Party: Republican
- Spouse: Lanny Wiles (m. 1982; div. 2017)
- Children: 2
- Parent: Pat Summerall (father)
- Education: University of Maryland, College Park (BA)

Susan L. Wiles (née Summerall; born May 14, 1957) is an American Republican political consultant and lobbyist who served as the 32nd White House chief of staff from 2025 to 2026, the first woman to hold the position.

Born to the football player and sportscaster Pat Summerall, Wiles graduated from the University of Maryland, College Park, in 1978. While attending university, she began working for New York representative Jack Kemp. Wiles later worked for Ronald Reagan's 1980 presidential campaign in his scheduling office, in the White House Office of Scheduling and Advance, and for Raymond J. Donovan, the secretary of labor. Wiles served as the district director for Tillie Fowler's 1992 campaign to represent Florida's 4th congressional district. She worked within the administration of Jacksonville mayor John Delaney and served as his chief of staff from 1997 to 2000. Wiles served in John Peyton's administration from 2003 to 2008.

In the 2010 Florida gubernatorial election, Wiles worked as Rick Scott's campaign manager. After Scott's victory, she served as Jon Huntsman Jr.'s campaign manager for his presidential campaign, though she resigned after less than a month amid a dispute with a strategist. In October 2015, Wiles was hired as a Florida campaign chairwoman for Donald Trump's 2016 presidential campaign. She became his campaign manager for Florida in September 2016. After Trump won that year's presidential election, Wiles moved to Washington, D.C., to lead the lobbying firm Ballard Partners with Brian D. Ballard. In September 2018, she was hired to lead Ron DeSantis' campaign for the 2018 Florida gubernatorial election. In 2020, Wiles was hired as a consultant for Israeli prime minister Benjamin Netanyahu for the 2020 Israeli legislative election.

In 2021, Wiles was appointed to lead then-former president Trump's fundraising apparatus, including Save America. She assumed a dominant role in Trump's political activities in between his first and second presidencies, including his travel, fundraising, and endorsements in the 2022 midterm elections. After Trump announced his presidential campaign in November 2022, Wiles was named as his campaign manager alongside Chris LaCivita. After his victory in the 2024 election, President-elect Trump announced that Wiles would serve as his White House chief of staff. In November 2026, Wiles resigned following the 2026 midterm elections.

== Early life and education ==
Susan L. Summerall was born on May 14, 1957, in Lake City, Florida. She was the first child of Pat Summerall and Katharine Jacobs. (Note: Pat and Katharine had two children after Wiles: Jay (born 1958/1959) and Kyle (born 1962/1963).) Pat was a professional football player before becoming a television sportscaster in 1962. After the 1958 NFL season, the Summeralls returned to Lake City. They moved to the Bronx the following year for the 1959 season, living temporarily in the Concourse Plaza Hotel. Pat suffered from alcoholism; in an interview with the Arkansas Democrat-Gazette in 2010, he stated that his drinking problems began after he retired following the 1961 season and started working for CBS Sports.

The Summeralls lived in Stamford, Connecticut, for three years before moving into a large house in Saddle River, New Jersey, in July 1967. In his autobiography Summerall: On and Off the Air (2006), Pat stated that Katharine "raised our children virtually on her own" and that he had "failed them as a father in the most critical years" in favor of his sports career. Susan played basketball and tennis, as well as running track and field. She was a member of the Girl Scouts of the USA troop that her mother ran. Summerall is an Episcopalian. She graduated from the Academy of the Holy Angels in Demarest, New Jersey, in 1975 and obtained a Bachelor of Arts degree in English from the University of Maryland, College Park, in 1978.

== Career ==
=== Staff assistant (1978–1984) ===
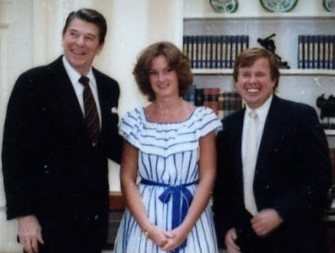
President Ronald Reagan with Summerall and Lanny Wiles in the Oval Office, 1982

In May 1978, Summerall began working for New York representative Jack Kemp as a receptionist and later an aide, from her father's connection to him; Pat Summerall and Kemp had played for the New York Giants in 1958. She continued to work for him by the following April. Summerall worked for Ronald Reagan's 1980 presidential campaign in his scheduling office. By May 1981, she had worked in the White House Office of Scheduling and Advance. In one of her final assignments, she helped Reagan prepare for a ten-day trip to Europe in June 1982. By that month, she had become a personal secretary for Raymond J. Donovan, the secretary of labor. She left her position by 1984.

=== Public work and relations management (1985–2015) ===
The Wileses moved to Ponte Vedra Beach, Florida, in 1985. Wiles worked for the Jacksonville Chamber of Commerce and led Jacksonville mayor Jake Godbold's public relations team. After the birth of her second child, she went on sabbatical. By 1988, Wiles had been living in Arcadia, where she was a member of the Florida Chamber of Commerce of DeSoto County and received an honor for co-leading the organization's women's forums that year. She returned to work that year as the head of campaign scheduling and advance work for Dan Quayle. In May 1991, the Wileses filed for federal bankruptcy protection after a failed hotel development deal in North Carolina indebted them. She served as the district director for Tillie Fowler's 1992 campaign to represent Florida's fourth congressional district. After the campaign, she ran Fowler's local offices.

In 1995, Wiles began working as Jacksonville mayor John Delaney's director of communications and intergovernmental affairs. In April 1996, Wiles became his deputy chief of staff, and in November 1997, she became the city's first female chief of staff. Wiles was key to the Better Jacksonville Plan and was the point person on the Preservation Project. Her tenure was marked by concerns that she had controlled the flow of information reaching Delaney. Wiles resigned in November 2000 to enter the private sector. She told The Florida Times-Union that her exit would allow her to spend more time with her family and to leave a "high-pressure job". Wiles became the chief operating officer of the real estate firm The Vestcor Companies the following month, but left after less than a month. In February 2001, she became a vice president at APCO Worldwide, a public affairs firm.

By March 2003, she had become a spokeswoman for Florida state representative Mike Weinstein, and later for John Peyton, Delaney's eventual successor. She began serving as Peyton chief of special initiatives and communications in August. Wiles oversaw Peyton's key initiatives, including early literacy, restoring the St. Johns River, and an anti-crime program. In June 2008, she stepped down to spend time with her family and travel. By February 2009, Wiles worked for Republic Services; concurrently, Peyton had sought a US$750 million proposal for Waste Management, Republic's competitor, to continue operating Jacksonville's landfill. She resigned from her position in response to a request from Peyton. In October, Wiles joined IF Marketing & Advertising, a marketing firm founded by former Jacksonville Jaguars player Tony Boselli that was set to open an office in Jacksonville. Additionally, Boselli and Wiles ran Ballard Partners' Jacksonville office by July 2011. She assisted in Rick Mullaney's mayoral campaign for the 2011 election.

In April 2010, Rick Scott announced that he would run for governor of Florida in that year's gubernatorial election. Wiles joined Scott's campaign a week later as his campaign manager. After Scott's victory in November, she served as his transition legislative liaison. After Scott's inauguration in January 2011, Wiles led a political action committee in advance of former Utah governor Jon Huntsman Jr.'s possible presidential campaign. In June, Huntsman named Wiles as the national campaign manager for his 2012 campaign. The following month, she left Huntsman's struggling campaign, telling the Miami Herald that "it was just time". Wiles's decision was viewed by The New York Times as "the first serious sign of concern" for the campaign. According to Politico, John Weaver, a strategist for Huntsman, had an internal feud with Wiles and forced her ouster. Wiles later supported former Massachusetts governor Mitt Romney in his presidential campaign, becoming a co-chair of his Florida advisory council in December. She served as the interim director of the Jacksonville Civic Council from February to September 2013. Wiles was a senior advisor to mayor Lenny Curry and served as his initial policy director.

=== Trump and DeSantis campaigns (2015–2020) ===
In October 2015, Wiles was named as a Florida campaign chairwoman for Donald Trump's 2016 presidential campaign alongside Joe Gruters. According to the Tampa Bay Times, Brian D. Ballard introduced Wiles to Trump, who was delighted that Wiles's father was Pat Summerall. Her role was described by The New York Times as "pivotal" in connecting Trump with local activists and political figures. She was named as a delegate for Florida at the 2016 Republican National Convention in May 2016. Wiles became Trump's Florida campaign manager after he removed Karen Giorno—who had clashed with Trump campaign officials—in September. Her strategy involved incorporating Trump's bombastic style with the Republican National Committee's ground operations, though the campaign's own ground game in Florida suffered from funding issues. According to Confidence Man (2022), amid polls showing Hillary Clinton beating Trump in Florida, Trump berated Wiles over his performance in the state and an advertisement that was aired without her consent. In the weeks leading up to the election, she pushed for an absentee ballot program, securing Trump additional voters, particularly those affected by Hurricane Matthew. Trump later won the state and the election. Concurrently, she worked for Ballard Partners.

Following Trump's first inauguration in January 2017, Wiles joined Ballard in his eponymous firm's Washington, D.C. office. She lobbied for the tobacco company Swisher and the Pebble Partnership, which developed the Pebble Mine. In September 2018, former representative Ron DeSantis appointed Wiles as the chair of his faltering gubernatorial campaign in the 2018 election. DeSantis's decision was indicative of Trump's influence on the election. Wiles's hiring marked a shift in the campaign's strategy towards assailing DeSantis's opponent, Andrew Gillum, improving DeSantis's polling numbers. After DeSantis' victory, Wiles led his transition efforts, including hiring his chief of staff, Shane Strum. She left the DeSantis campaign to handle the Republican Party's operations in Florida, setting off a feud between her and Strum. State Republicans, led by Strum and first lady Casey DeSantis, sought to oust associates of Wiles within the party, leading to Ron distancing himself from the party apparatus. In September 2019, a leaked internal memorandum detailing how Ron DeSantis' political team could charge lobbyists for access intensified the conflict, with close advisors to him accusing Wiles of leaking the document. Trump's 2020 campaign severed ties with Wiles at DeSantis' behest, according to Politico. The New York Times later reported that the move, though agreed to by Trump and the campaign manager Brad Parscale, infuriated several Trump advisors who believed that Wiles would be able to win the state. That day, Wiles told Florida Politics that she had left Ballard Partners, citing health reasons. In 2020, Wiles and a team of Trump staffers briefly worked as consultants for Israeli Prime Minister Benjamin Netanyahu on his campaign in the 2020 Israeli legislative election.

=== Campaign manager and advisor to Trump (2020–2024) ===
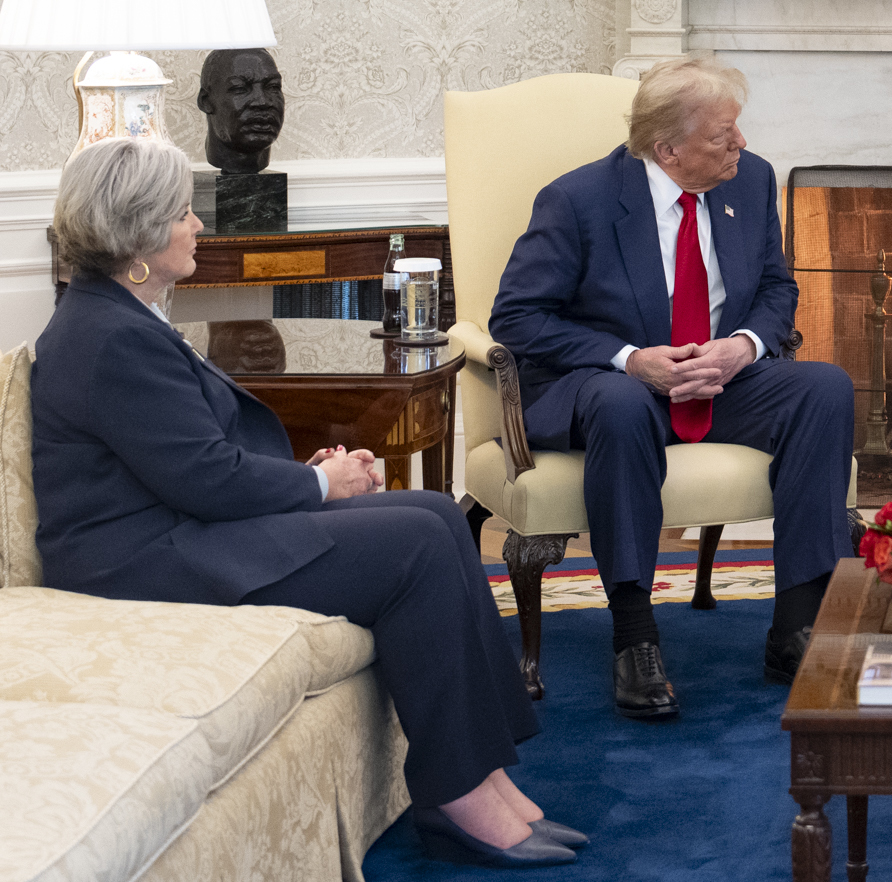
Wiles and President-elect Donald Trump in the Oval Office, 2024

Amid polls showing Joe Biden beating Trump in Florida in the 2020 presidential election, advisors urged Trump to rehire Wiles. In July 2020, Wiles returned to the Trump campaign as an unpaid advisor to organizers of the Republican National Convention. In apparent response, DeSantis directed his fundraiser, Heather Barker, to tell donors that they should not donate to the convention. Wiles's influence in the Trump campaign increased in the months leading up to the election, with her suggestions to win Florida being implemented. Trump's campaign hired David Bossie to ensure that DeSantis could not interfere with Wiles's work for the campaign.

In March 2021, following his loss, Trump named Wiles to lead his fundraising operations, including Save America, a political action committee. Wiles asked Trump to cover only her travel expenses. By June, her role had diminished as Trump relocated to his golf club in Bedminster, New Jersey. In Virginia, Wiles was credited with Glenn Youngkin's victory in that year's gubernatorial election by preventing Trump from visiting the state, giving Youngkin distance from Trump. Jeff Roe, a political consultant, told Politico Magazine that he "worked with Susie Wiles the whole way through." She joined Mercury Public Affairs as a co-chair of global public strategy in February 2022.

Wiles managed much of Trump's post-presidential activities, including his travel, fundraising, and endorsements for the 2022 elections. She established a vetting process for endorsements that involved polling and field research, though she also worked to influence Trump's recommendations. Wiles worked for Blake Masters's political action committee in the Republican primary for the 2022 Senate election in Arizona. At Wiles's suggestion, Chris Kise joined Trump's legal team to represent him in the classified documents case. She led a successful effort to eliminate Liz Cheney, a representative who opposed Trump, in that year's Republican primary for Wyoming's at-large district. In November, Trump announced that he was running in the 2024 election. His campaign opted to divide the campaign manager role between Wiles and Chris LaCivita, a political consultant. The New York Times referred to Wiles as "perhaps the most significant voice" within Trump's campaign. She privately supported Ronna McDaniel's successful fourth campaign for chair of the Republican National Committee and informally advised Daniel Davis in his campaign in the 2023 Jacksonville mayoral election. As Trump's legal issues mounted throughout 2023, Wiles was responsible for paying lawyers and for ensuring delegates would be loyal to Trump.

== White House Chief of Staff (2025–2026) ==
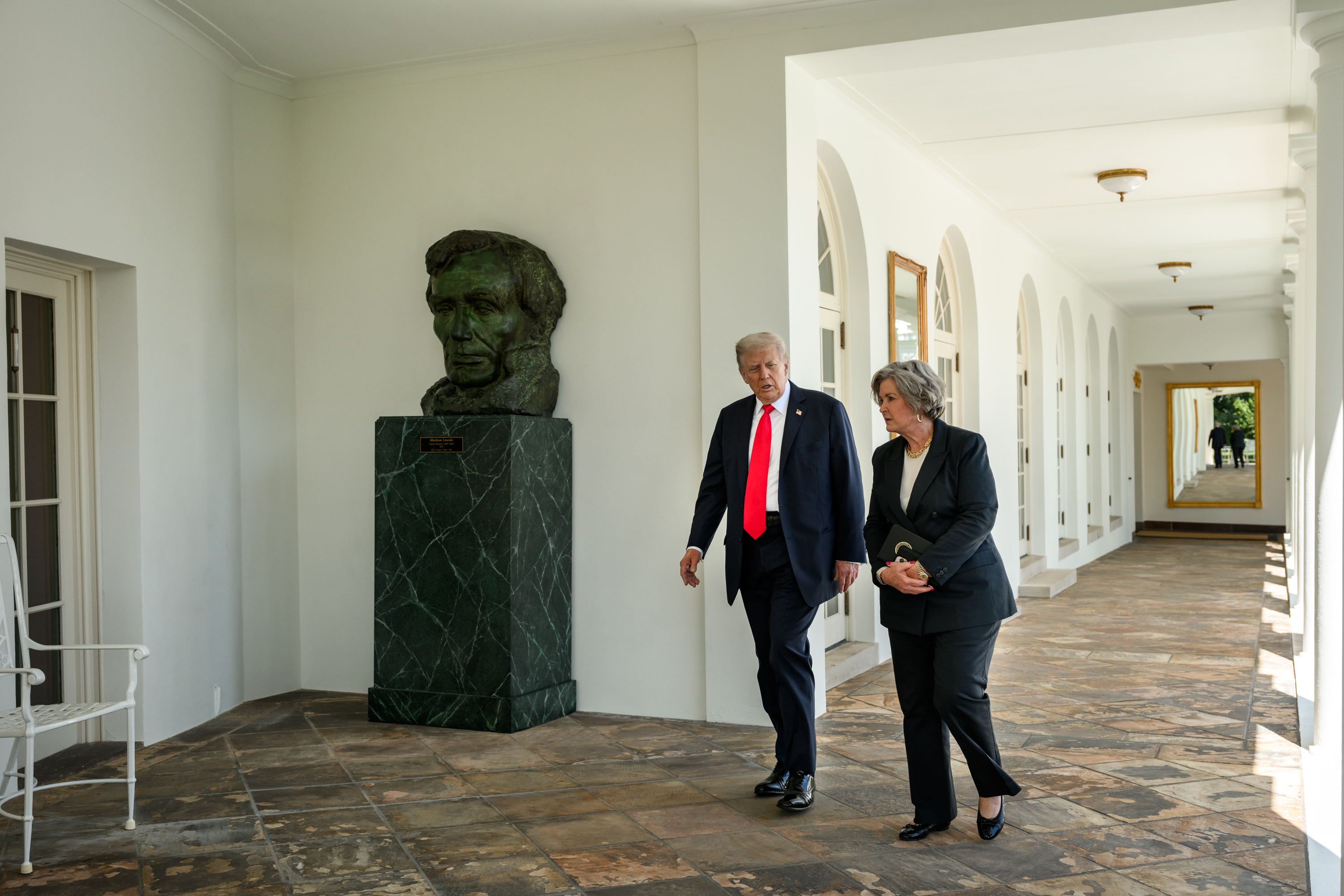
Wiles walks with President Donald Trump on the West Colonnade to the Oval Office, 2025

Following Donald Trump's victory in the 2024 presidential election, Wiles was expected to be named as his White House chief of staff. The day after Trump was declared the victor, he named her as his chief of staff, the first woman to hold the post. According to The New York Times, Wiles did not dissociate from Mercury Public Affairs until Trump's announcement. Wiles tentatively established a staff structure in which the Presidential Personnel Office would serve beneath the Office of Cabinet Affairs, set to be managed by Taylor Budowich. In December 2024, Trump replaced Bill McGinley, who was set to assume the position of White House counsel, with David Warrington, a choice Wiles preferred.

As chief of staff, Wiles was involved in negotiating the prisoner exchange of the Russian entrepreneur Alexander Vinnik for the American schoolteacher Marc Fogel in February 2025. That month, Trump fired the board of the John F. Kennedy Center for the Performing Arts and named Wiles, among other loyalists, to the board. She was named in Associated Press v. Budowich (2025), a lawsuit filed by the Associated Press against Trump officials who blocked the news agency from press events and locations over its stance on the Gulf of Mexico naming controversy; Wiles had emailed the Associated Press, alleging that the apparent influence of its stylebook had been "misused, and at times weaponized, to push a divisive and partisan agenda."

In May 2025, The Wall Street Journal reported on a federal investigation into an effort to impersonate Wiles to obtain information and cash from prominent Republican officials. Wiles told associates that the contacts list on her personal phone had been hacked. In December, Vanity Fair published several interviews with Wiles, in which she gave candid descriptions of Trump's presidency. Wiles claimed that she had attempted to get Trump to end his retribution campaign and made several critical remarks about officials in Trump's administration, including Vance; Elon Musk; and Russell Vought, the director of the Office of Management and Budget. Trump and several members of his cabinet publicly expressed support for Wiles after the interviews.

In October 2026, Politico reported that Trump was considering firing Wiles and appointing Stephen Miller, the White House deputy chief of staff for policy, as the White House chief of staff. On November 6, Wiles announced her resignation following GOP losses in the 2026 midterm elections. Trump appointed Miller to succeed Wiles.

== Personal life ==
From 1982 to 2017, Wiles was married to her husband Lanny, having initially met while working for Ronald Reagan's 1980 presidential campaign. The couple have two daughters, Katie and Caroline, both of whom also work in political consulting. Wiles identifies as an Episcopalian.

In March 2026, Trump disclosed that Wiles had breast cancer, but that she would remain in her position. Wiles declared that she was cancer-free in September.

== Notes ==
Political offices
Preceded by Jeff Zients	White House Chief of Staff; 2025–2026	Succeeded by Stephen Miller
