= 2021 Alsco Uniforms 302 =

Race details
- Race 27 of 33 of the 2021 NASCAR Xfinity Series
- Date: September 25, 2021
- Official name: Alsco Uniforms 302
- Location: North Las Vegas, Nevada, Las Vegas Motor Speedway
- Course: Permanent racing facility
- Course length: 1.5 miles (2.4 km)
- Distance: 201 laps, 301.5 mi (485.214 km)
- Scheduled distance: 201 laps, 301.5 mi (485.214 km)
- Average speed: 123.509 miles per hour (198.768 km/h)

Pole position
Driver	Austin Cindric	Team Penske
- Grid positions set by competition-based formula

Most laps led
Driver	Justin Allgaier	JR Motorsports
- Laps: 90

Winner
No. 1	Josh Berry	JR Motorsports

Television in the United States
- Network: NBCSN
- Announcers: Rick Allen, Jeff Burton, Brad Daugherty

Radio in the United States
- Radio: Performance Racing Network

The 2021 Alsco Uniforms 302 was the 27th stock car race of the 2021 NASCAR Xfinity Series, the 4th iteration of the event, and the first race of the playoffs and the Round of 12. The race was held on Saturday, September 25, 2021, in North Las Vegas, Nevada at Las Vegas Motor Speedway, a 1.5 miles (2.4 km) permanent D-shaped oval racetrack. The race took 201 laps to complete. Josh Berry, in a dominating finish where his team, JR Motorsports finished 1–2–3, won the race after almost being involved in a wreck early in the race. Justin Allgaier and Noah Gragson would fill in the rest of the podium positions, finishing second and third, respectively.

== Background ==
The layout of Las Vegas Motor Speedway, the venue where the race was held.

Las Vegas Motor Speedway, located in Clark County, Nevada outside the Las Vegas city limits and about 15 miles northeast of the Las Vegas Strip, is a 1,200-acre (490 ha) complex of multiple tracks for motorsports racing. The complex is owned by Speedway Motorsports, Inc., which is headquartered in Charlotte, North Carolina.

=== Entry list ===
#	Driver	Team	Make	Sponsor
0	Jeffrey Earnhardt	JD Motorsports	Chevrolet	ForeverLawn Premium Synthetic Grass K9 Grass
1	Michael Annett*	JR Motorsports	Chevrolet	Pilot Flying J "If You've Got It A Trucker Brought It"
2	Myatt Snider	Richard Childress Racing	Chevrolet	Alsco Uniforms
02	Brett Moffitt	Our Motorsports	Chevrolet	Our Motorsports
4	Landon Cassill	JD Motorsports	Chevrolet	Voyager
5	Matt Mills	B. J. McLeod Motorsports	Chevrolet	J. F. Electric
6	Ryan Vargas	JD Motorsports	Chevrolet	KDST CPA
7	Justin Allgaier	JR Motorsports	Chevrolet	Brandt Professional Agriculture
07	Joe Graf Jr.	SS-Green Light Racing	Chevrolet	Bucked Up Energy
8	Sam Mayer	JR Motorsports	Chevrolet	Big Machine Records, "29: Written in Stone" by Carly Pearce
9	Noah Gragson	JR Motorsports	Chevrolet	Bass Pro Shops, Black Rifle Coffee Company
10	Jeb Burton	Kaulig Racing	Chevrolet	Nutrien Ag Solutions
11	Justin Haley	Kaulig Racing	Chevrolet	LeafFilter Gutter Protection
13	Timmy Hill	MBM Motorsports	Toyota	
15	Bayley Currey	JD Motorsports	Chevrolet	JD Motorsports
16	A. J. Allmendinger	Kaulig Racing	Chevrolet	Hyperice
17	J. J. Yeley	SS-Green Light Racing with Rick Ware Racing	Chevrolet	Parler "Your Voice Matters, Freedom To Speak"
18	Daniel Hemric	Joe Gibbs Racing	Toyota	Poppy Bank
19	Brandon Jones	Joe Gibbs Racing	Toyota	Menards, Jeld-Wen
20	Harrison Burton	Joe Gibbs Racing	Toyota	DEX Imaging
22	Austin Cindric	Team Penske	Ford	Odyssey Battery
23	Blaine Perkins	Our Motorsports	Chevrolet	Raceline
26	Dylan Lupton	Sam Hunt Racing	Toyota	Marques General Engineering
31	Ty Dillon	Jordan Anderson Racing	Chevrolet	South Point Hotel, Casino & Spa
36	Alex Labbé	DGM Racing	Chevrolet	Larue Industrial Snowblowers, Alloy Employer Services "Stronger by design"
39	Ryan Sieg	RSS Racing	Ford	CMR Construction & Roofing
44	Tommy Joe Martins	Martins Motorsports	Chevrolet	Market Rebellion
47	Kyle Weatherman	Mike Harmon Racing	Chevrolet	Peace Officers Research Association of California
48	Jade Buford	Big Machine Racing Team	Chevrolet	Big Machine Vodka Spiked Cooler
51	Jeremy Clements	Jeremy Clements Racing	Chevrolet	First Pacific Funding
52	Carson Ware	Rick Ware Racing	Toyota	KeepItSecure.net
54	Ty Gibbs	Joe Gibbs Racing	Toyota	Interstate Batteries
61	David Starr	Hattori Racing Enterprises	Toyota	Angry Crab Shack
66	Matt Jaskol	MBM Motorsports	Toyota	Auto Parts 4 Less
68	Brandon Brown	Brandonbilt Motorsports	Chevrolet	Trade The Chain
74	C. J. McLaughlin	Mike Harmon Racing	Chevrolet	Sci Aps
78	Mason Massey	B. J. McLeod Motorsports	Toyota	Gerber Collision & Glass
90	Spencer Boyd	DGM Racing	Chevrolet	Mini Doge
92	Josh Williams	DGM Racing	Chevrolet	Silverton Hotel and Casino
98	Riley Herbst	Stewart-Haas Racing	Ford	South Point Hotel, Casino & Spa
99	B. J. McLeod	B. J. McLeod Motorsports	Chevrolet	Family First Life
Official entry list

*Driver changed to Josh Berry due to a leg injury Annett had suffered.

== Qualifying ==
Qualifying was determined by a qualifying metric system based on the last race, the 2021 Food City 300 and owner's points. As a result, Austin Cindric of Team Penske won the pole.

Pos.	#	Driver	Team	Make
1	22	Austin Cindric	Team Penske	Ford
2	16	A. J. Allmendinger	Kaulig Racing	Chevrolet
3	7	Justin Allgaier	JR Motorsports	Chevrolet
4	11	Justin Haley	Kaulig Racing	Chevrolet
5	20	Harrison Burton	Joe Gibbs Racing	Toyota
6	54	Ty Gibbs	Joe Gibbs Racing	Toyota
7	18	Daniel Hemric	Joe Gibbs Racing	Toyota
8	19	Brandon Jones	Joe Gibbs Racing	Toyota
9	9	Noah Gragson	JR Motorsports	Chevrolet
10	98	Riley Herbst	Stewart-Haas Racing	Ford
11	8	Sam Mayer	JR Motorsports	Chevrolet
12	2	Myatt Snider	Richard Childress Racing	Chevrolet
13	51	Jeremy Clements	Jeremy Clements Racing	Chevrolet
14	10	Jeb Burton	Kaulig Racing	Chevrolet
15	1	Josh Berry	JR Motorsports	Chevrolet
16	68	Brandon Brown	Brandonbilt Motorsports	Chevrolet
17	36	Alex Labbé	DGM Racing	Chevrolet
18	92	Josh Williams	DGM Racing	Chevrolet
19	44	Tommy Joe Martins	Martins Motorsports	Chevrolet
20	39	Ryan Sieg	RSS Racing	Ford
21	07	Joe Graf Jr.	SS-Green Light Racing	Chevrolet
22	0	Jeffrey Earnhardt	JD Motorsports	Chevrolet
23	48	Jade Buford	Big Machine Racing Team	Chevrolet
24	23	Blaine Perkins	Our Motorsports	Chevrolet
25	26	Dylan Lupton	Sam Hunt Racing	Toyota
26	47	Kyle Weatherman	Mike Harmon Racing	Chevrolet
27	02	Brett Moffitt	Our Motorsports	Chevrolet
28	31	Ty Dillon	Jordan Anderson Racing	Chevrolet
29	5	Matt Mills	B. J. McLeod Motorsports	Chevrolet
30	78	Mason Massey	B. J. McLeod Motorsports	Toyota
31	6	Ryan Vargas	JD Motorsports	Chevrolet
32	90	Spencer Boyd	DGM Racing	Chevrolet
33	17	J. J. Yeley	SS-Green Light Racing with Rick Ware Racing	Chevrolet
34	66	Matt Jaskol	MBM Motorsports	Toyota
35	52	Carson Ware	Rick Ware Racing	Toyota
36	15	Bayley Currey	JD Motorsports	Chevrolet
37	4	Landon Cassill	JD Motorsports	Chevrolet
38	61	David Starr	Hattori Racing Enterprises	Toyota
39	99	B. J. McLeod	B. J. McLeod Motorsports	Chevrolet
40	74	C. J. McLaughlin	Mike Harmon Racing	Chevrolet
Failed to qualify
41	13	Timmy Hill	MBM Motorsports	Toyota
Official starting lineup

== Race ==
=== Pre-race ceremonies ===
In driver introductions, Matt Jaskol, Las Vegas native who was starting 34th would skydive out of a helicopter onto the track.

== Race results ==
Stage 1 Laps: 45

Fin	#	Driver	Team	Make	Pts
1	16	A. J. Allmendinger	Kaulig Racing	Chevrolet	10
2	18	Daniel Hemric	Joe Gibbs Racing	Toyota	9
3	22	Austin Cindric	Team Penske	Ford	8
4	54	Ty Gibbs	Joe Gibbs Racing	Toyota	7
5	9	Noah Gragson	JR Motorsports	Chevrolet	6
6	20	Harrison Burton	Joe Gibbs Racing	Toyota	5
7	39	Ryan Sieg	RSS Racing	Ford	4
8	19	Brandon Jones	Joe Gibbs Racing	Toyota	3
9	1	Josh Berry	JR Motorsports	Chevrolet	2
10	02	Brett Moffitt	Our Motorsports	Chevrolet	1

Stage 2 Laps: 45

Fin	#	Driver	Team	Make	Pts
1	7	Justin Allgaier	JR Motorsports	Chevrolet	10
2	31	Ty Dillon	Jordan Anderson Racing	Chevrolet	9
3	22	Austin Cindric	Team Penske	Ford	8
4	9	Noah Gragson	JR Motorsports	Chevrolet	7
5	18	Daniel Hemric	Joe Gibbs Racing	Toyota	6
6	1	Josh Berry	JR Motorsports	Chevrolet	5
7	54	Ty Gibbs	Joe Gibbs Racing	Toyota	4
8	02	Brett Moffitt	Our Motorsports	Chevrolet	3
9	16	A. J. Allmendinger	Kaulig Racing	Chevrolet	2
10	11	Justin Haley	Kaulig Racing	Chevrolet	1

Stage 3 Laps: 111

Fin	St	#	Driver	Team	Make	Laps	Led	Status	Pts
1	15	1	Josh Berry	JR Motorsports	Chevrolet	201	38	running	47
2	3	7	Justin Allgaier	JR Motorsports	Chevrolet	201	90	running	45
3	9	9	Noah Gragson	JR Motorsports	Chevrolet	201	1	running	47
4	1	22	Austin Cindric	Team Penske	Ford	201	33	running	49
5	7	18	Daniel Hemric	Joe Gibbs Racing	Toyota	201	0	running	47
6	8	19	Brandon Jones	Joe Gibbs Racing	Toyota	201	0	running	34
7	2	16	A. J. Allmendinger	Kaulig Racing	Chevrolet	201	20	running	42
8	28	31	Ty Dillon	Jordan Anderson Racing	Chevrolet	201	17	running	38
9	4	11	Justin Haley	Kaulig Racing	Chevrolet	201	2	running	29
10	5	20	Harrison Burton	Joe Gibbs Racing	Toyota	201	0	running	32
11	6	54	Ty Gibbs	Joe Gibbs Racing	Toyota	200	0	running	37
12	27	02	Brett Moffitt	Our Motorsports	Chevrolet	200	0	running	29
13	36	15	Bayley Currey	JD Motorsports	Chevrolet	200	0	running	0
14	19	44	Tommy Joe Martins	Martins Motorsports	Chevrolet	200	0	running	23
15	12	2	Myatt Snider	Richard Childress Racing	Chevrolet	200	0	running	22
16	37	4	Landon Cassill	JD Motorsports	Chevrolet	200	0	running	21
17	20	39	Ryan Sieg	RSS Racing	Ford	199	0	running	24
18	26	47	Kyle Weatherman	Mike Harmon Racing	Chevrolet	199	0	running	19
19	31	6	Ryan Vargas	JD Motorsports	Chevrolet	199	0	running	18
20	24	23	Blaine Perkins	Our Motorsports	Chevrolet	198	0	running	17
21	38	61	David Starr	Hattori Racing Enterprises	Toyota	197	0	running	16
22	16	68	Brandon Brown	Brandonbilt Motorsports	Chevrolet	197	0	running	15
23	30	78	Mason Massey	B. J. McLeod Motorsports	Toyota	197	0	running	14
24	18	92	Josh Williams	DGM Racing	Chevrolet	196	0	running	13
25	32	90	Spencer Boyd	DGM Racing	Chevrolet	196	0	running	0
26	23	48	Jade Buford	Big Machine Racing Team	Chevrolet	195	0	running	11
27	34	66	Matt Jaskol	MBM Motorsports	Toyota	195	0	running	10
28	29	5	Matt Mills	B. J. McLeod Motorsports	Chevrolet	194	0	running	9
29	22	0	Jeffrey Earnhardt	JD Motorsports	Chevrolet	194	0	running	8
30	39	99	B. J. McLeod	B. J. McLeod Motorsports	Chevrolet	193	0	running	0
31	35	52	Carson Ware	Rick Ware Racing	Toyota	113	0	electrical	6
32	40	74	C. J. McLaughlin	Mike Harmon Racing	Chevrolet	100	0	overheating	5
33	10	98	Riley Herbst	Stewart-Haas Racing	Ford	31	0	accident	4
34	11	8	Sam Mayer	JR Motorsports	Chevrolet	31	0	accident	3
35	25	26	Dylan Lupton	Sam Hunt Racing	Toyota	31	0	accident	0
36	14	10	Jeb Burton	Kaulig Racing	Chevrolet	30	0	accident	1
37	33	17	J. J. Yeley	SS-Green Light Racing with Rick Ware Racing	Chevrolet	30	0	accident	1
38	17	36	Alex Labbé	DGM Racing	Chevrolet	30	0	accident	1
39	13	51	Jeremy Clements	Jeremy Clements Racing	Chevrolet	30	0	accident	1
40	21	07	Joe Graf Jr.	SS-Green Light Racing	Chevrolet	30	0	accident	1
Failed to qualify
41		13	Timmy Hill	MBM Motorsports	Toyota				
Official race results

Previous race: 2021 Food City 300	NASCAR Xfinity Series; 2021 season	Next race: 2021 Sparks 300
