= Werner Stegmaier =

German philosopher (born 1946)

Werner Stegmaier (born 19 July 1946 in Ludwigsburg) is a German philosopher. He was the founding director of the Department of Philosophy at the University of Greifswald after the collapse of the Soviet Union and the German reunification. From 1994 until 2011, he was chair of philosophy with a focus on practical philosophy. His main field of research is the philosophy of orientation. He first published it in the German Philosophie der Orientierung (2008); its English translation has been published as What is Orientation? A Philosophical Investigation (2019). To promote the ideas of this philosophical approach, the Foundation for Philosophical Orientation was founded in Nashville, Tennessee, in 2018. His second major field of research is Friedrich Nietzsche's philosophy. Both areas of research are integrated in his Nietzsche meets Luhmann. Orientierung im Nihilismus (2016). In 2018, the Hodges Foundation for Philosophical Orientation was founded in Nashville, Tennessee (USA) with the aim of making this philosophy known in the English-speaking world and continuing to develop it by collaborating with people from diverse backgrounds. Most recently, he published Wittgensteins Orientierung. Techniken der Vergewisserung (Wittgenstein's Orientation: Techniques of Assurance, 2025).

== Life ==
After receiving his graduate degree (Staatsexamen) in philosophy, German studies, and Latin philology, he earned his doctorate in philosophy under the supervision of Karl Ulmer and Josef Simon in 1974 at the University of Tübingen. He taught for a few years at upper level high schools (Gymnasium) and at the University of Stuttgart. He became research assistant of Josef Simon at the University of Bonn, where he defended his habilitation on Philosophie der Fluktuanz. Dilthey und Nietzsche. In his inaugural address, he dealt with Immanuel Kant’s treatise What Does It Mean To Orient Oneself in Thinking?, on the basis of which he later developed his Philosophy of Orientation. After serving as an interim professor in Berlin, he went to Greifswald, where he still lives today. Stegmaier founded the North- and East-European Forum for Philosophy, which connected philosophy departments around the Baltic Sea. It organized annual summer schools and supported the philosophical reorientation in countries formerly controlled by the Soviet Union in a project “Empirical Research on Philosophy,” supported by the Deutsche Forschungsgemeinschaft. From 1997 until 2017, Stegmaier was the chief editor of the journal Nietzsche-Studien. International Yearbook for Nietzsche Research as well as of the Monographs and Texts of Nietzsche Research (both published by Walter de Gruyter, Berlin/Boston). He has organized numerous academic conferences on the philosophy of Nietzsche, the philosophy of orientation, signs and time, on the contemporary philosophical significance of the Jewish tradition, and on the thinking of Nietzsche and Luhmann. The philosophy of orientation has influenced various fields, including the sports science, linguistics, musicology, psychotherapy, architecture, and theology. In 2019, an abbreviated and updated version was published in English under the title What is Orientation? A Philosophical Investigation. Founded in 2018, the Hodges Foundation for Philosophical Orientation in Nashville, Tennessee, hosts prize competitions, seminars, research colloquia, publishes books, and awards research grants in order to further develop this philosophy. He has organized numerous academic conferences on Nietzsche’s philosophy, the philosophy of orientation, the sign, and time, the philosophical relevance of the Jewish tradition, and the thinking of Nietzsche and Luhmann. The philosophy of orientation has found applications in, among other fields, sports science, linguistics, musicology, psychotherapy, architecture, and theology. In 2019, a concise and updated version of the German philosophy of orientation was published in English under the title What is Orientation? A Philosophical Investigation, translated by Reinhard G. Mueller. The Foundation for Philosophical Orientation, inaugurated in Nashville, Tennessee, in 2019, awards scholarships, organizes competitions, seminars, and research colloquia, publishes relevant essays, and operates its own publishing house, Orientations Press.

== Philosophical work ==
=== Substance and Fluctuance ===
Stegmaier discovered in his dissertation that ‘substance,’ the foundational concept of metaphysics, which denotes that which persists in being and which Aristotle conceived of as a substance-accident-relation, Descartes as a substance-substance-relation, and Leibniz as a substance-relation-relation, is itself in flux. Stegmaier coined it in his work on Nietzsche and Dilthey ‘fluctuance,’ i.e. a unit, which can, over time, change and replace all its attributes and thereby completely change its identity.

=== Orientation ===
With Emmanuel Levinas and Jacques Derrida, whose philosophies Stegmaier dealt with in numerous publications, his work delved into the Jewish tradition, which has remained largely foreign to the European philosophy that derives from Greek philosophy. The Jewish tradition conceives of the Torah as a source of ever-new orientations. The philosophical concept of orientation was first introduced by Moses Mendelssohn, a Jew who became one of the most famous enlighteners of his time; after his death, the concept was adopted by Immanuel Kant in his “What Does It Mean to Orient Oneself in Thinking?” Since then, the term of orientation has widely spread in everyday language use not only in most European, but also many other languages. In his magnum opus, the Philosophie der Orientierung (English: What is Orientation? A Philosophical Investigation), Stegmaier made ‘orientation’ the foundational term of a new philosophy for the present day. In light of relentless orientation crises, the term permeates current debates in both the private and public realm in a hardly noticed way. ‘Orientation’ is often used, especially in philosophy but also in science, to define other terms, without itself being defined. Because orientation is also required when analyzing orientation itself (in an orientation about orientation), it is an ultimate term, which one perpetually returns to when trying to go behind it. Orientation is factually self-referential as well: if one orients oneself in a situation, the situation changes, and the new situation requires a new orientation. But since all situations are different, one cannot expect universally valid orientations. For Stegmaier, orientation precedes all cognition and action; therefore, all cognition and action must and can be conceived of in the specific structures of orientation. Orientation structures itself by relying on ‘footholds’ (German, Anhaltspunkte), which it gathers, based on its own needs, in the situations it is in. Orientation orders them, from a specific standpoint within a specific horizon in a specific perspective, in recognizable patterns, and it abbreviates them into signs that allow for communication and thus for an orientation to other orientations. Footholds and signs, however, always allow for leeways (German, Spielräume) for interpretation, which each orientation performs in its own way; one always orients oneself ‘to’ something within individual and situational leeways. According to Stegmaier, this is true for scientific facts as well, to which one orients oneself in various methodically disciplined manners. Orientations find hold not in any existing universals, but in (everyday or scientific) routines, which develop over time and thus may become so self-evident that they are no longer noticed and thus (more or less) vanish from consciousness. In this way, routines relieve an orientation. Thinking, which traditional philosophy has relied on without question, arises when routines are disrupted or disturbed, including language routines; it creates distances from that which appears self-evident establishing its own hold in its own orders, among which is logic. But logic, too, is a specific kind of orientation, especially the scientific one; it does not belong to the world per se. Orientation to another orientation are doubly contingent (here, Stegmaier adopts the concept of Talcott Parsons and Niklas Luhmann): others can, in interaction and communication, always react in a different way than you expect it; and both interlocutors know this. All societal orders (according to Luhmann: the functional systems of the communication of society) must deal with this double contingency. Stegmaier shows how this takes place in economics, politics, the law, science, art, and religion; how all these societal orientation worlds orient individuals, and how individuals in turn orient themselves to them. They professionalize specific needs of orientation. In ethics, Stegmaier distinguishes between moral orientation, as a self-binding commitment due to certain norms and values, and ethical orientation, as the reflection of such self-bindings and the forgoing of reciprocity and universality. In this way, he obtains the rightful place for virtues, which are greatly appreciated by everyone, but which moral philosophers have so far less taken into account, such as open-mindedness and unbiasedness, benevolence and friendliness, tactfulness, nobility, and goodness. Eventually, Stegmaier shows how standardizations permit conceiving of our world orientation in terms of global communication, how traditional metaphysics can be considered a mode of orientation, and what the significance of death is for orientation.

=== Nietzsche Research ===
In Nietzsche research, where he has earned an immense influence, Stegmaier has gained prominence by claiming that the famous doctrines of the overman (Übermensch) and the eternal recurrence of the same and of the will to power (which Nietzsche puts into the mouth of his Zarathustra, the protagonist of his famous poem), are all “anti-doctrines,” i.e. doctrines that undermine the very assumption of any existing universals; their anti-doctrinal character is where, according to Stegmaier, they find their unity. With what he calls ‘contextual interpretation,’ i.e. understanding Nietzsche's philosophical content within the context of his forms of writing, Stegmaier established a methodic paradigm for Nietzsche studies, which he himself comprehensively exemplifies in his interpretation of the 5th book of Nietzsche's The Gay Science. This paradigm has gained great attention in Nietzsche research. In his most recent works, he has shown in numerous contributions how Nietzsche's foundational distinctions in philosophy can, in connection with Luhmann's sociological systems theory, further be developed in the 21st century. With his publication Nietzsche an der Arbeit (2022), he solved a problem that existed since the 1950s, the problem of the significance of Nietzsche's notes for his philosophizing. While his notes were first pushed into a system in the falsifying compilation The Will to Power, they can now be understood, on the basis of the new edition of his late notes, the KGW IX, as an experimental orientation process in which his alleged doctrines are only preliminary stages. With his 2022 book Nietzsche an der Arbeit (Nietzsche at Work), he resolved the long-standing question – dating back to the 1950s – of the significance of Nietzsche’s notes for his philosophy. They are evidence of Nietzsche's ongoing process of experimental orientation, in which his published works are merely intermediate stages.

=== Forms of Philosophical Writing ===
Not only with regard to Nietzsche, but to overall 50 outstanding philosophers of the Western tradition, Stegmaier elaborated how great philosophical innovations were accompanied by the invention of new literary forms of philosophical writing. In this sense, Parmenides created a narrative of the gods in order to be able to present his doctrine of true being, Plato the dialogic form in order to avoid any doctrines, Aristotle the treatise in order to present it in his own name, etc., up to Frege's Begriffsschrift, Wittgenstein's album and Levinas' Talmud interpretation. According to Stegmaier, these forms are not mere literary garment, but from them the respective philosophy itself can and must be understood.

=== Techniques of Assurance ===
Finally, drawing on Ludwig Wittgenstein’s Philosophical Investigations, Stegmaier clarified how, in nihilism —where there are no apparent ultimate certainties — one can achieve a sufficient degree of orientational certainty in philosophical inquiry through “techniques of assurance.”

== Publications ==
=== Monographs (selection) ===
- 1977: Substanz. Grundbegriff der Metaphysik (Stuttgart-Bad Cannstatt: Frommann-Holzboog 1977), 232 pages.
- 1987: (co-edited with Karl Ulmer und Wolf Häfele) Bedingungen der Zukunft. Ein naturwissenschaftlich-philosophischer Dialog (Stuttgart-Bad Cannstatt: Frommann-Holzboog, 1987), 247 pages.
- 1992: Philosophie der Fluktuanz. Dilthey und Nietzsche (Göttingen: Vandenhoeck & Ruprecht, 1992), 413 pages. Habilitation, Bonn 1990.
- 1994: Nietzsches, Genealogie der Moral‘. Werkinterpretation (Darmstadt: Wissenschaftliche Buchgesellschaft, 1994), 267 pages.
- 1997: Interpretationen. Hauptwerke der Philosophie. Von Kant bis Nietzsche (Stuttgart: Reclam, 1997), 464 pages.
- 2008: Philosophie der Orientierung (Berlin/New York: Walter de Gruyter, 2008), 804 pages.
- 2009: Levinas. Reihe Meisterdenker (Freiburg/Basel/Wien: Herder, 2002), 224 pages; reprint: Hamburg: Junius, 4th ed., 238 pages.
- 2011: Nietzsche zur Einführung (Hamburg: Junius, 2011), 212 pages.
- 2012: Nietzsches Befreiung der Philosophie. Kontextuelle Interpretation des V. Buchs der Fröhlichen Wissenschaft (Berlin/ Boston: Walter de Gruyter, 2012), 754 pages.
- 2016: Orientierung im Nihilismus. Luhmann meets Nietzsche (Berlin/Boston: Walter de Gruyter, 2016), 436 pages.
- 2018: Europa im Geisterkrieg. Studien zu Nietzsche, ed. Andrea Bertino (Cambridge: Open Book Publishers, 2018), 638 pages (open access).
- 2019: What is Orientation? A Philosophical Orientation (abridged and revised edition of Philosophie der Orientierung [2008]), transl. Reinhard G. Mueller (Berlin/Boston: Walter de Gruyter, 2019), 352 pages (translated, abridged, and revised edition of Philosophie der Orientierung [2008])
- 2021: Formen philosophischer Schriften zur Einführung (Forms of Philosophical Writing) (Hamburg: Junius, 2021), 288 pages.
- 2022: Orientierung und Ander(s)heit, together with Burkhard Liebsch (Hamburg: Meiner, 2022), 276 pages.
- 2022: Nietzsche an der Arbeit. Das Gewicht seiner nachgelassenen Aufzeichnungen für sein Philosophieren (Berlin/Boston: De Gruyter, 2022), 416 pages.
- 2024: Orientation in Philosophy: Courageous Beginnings (Nashville, Tennessee: Orientations Press, 2024), 281 pages.
- 2025: Wittgensteins Orientierung. Techniken der Vergewisserung (Frankfurt am Main: Vittorio Klostermann, 2024), 242 pages.

=== As editor (selection) ===
- 1992 (co-edited with Tilman Borsche): Zur Philosophie des Zeichens (Berlin/New York: Walter de Gruyter, 1992), 231 pages.
- 1993 (co-edited with Gebhard Fürst): Der Rat als Quelle des Ethischen. Zur Praxis des Dialogs (Stuttgart: Akademie der Diözese Rottenburg-Stuttgart, 1993), 132 pages.
- 1997 (co-edited with Daniel Krochmalnik): Jüdischer Nietzscheanismus (Berlin/New York: Walter de Gruyter, 1997), 476 pages.
- 1994–2000 (co-edited with Josef Simon): Zeichen und Interpretation I-VI (Frankfurt am Main: Suhrkamp, 1994-2000), each approx. 300 pages.
- 2000 (ed.): Europa-Philosophie (Berlin/New York: Walter de Gruyter, 2000), 194 pages.
- 2000 (ed.): Die philosophische Aktualität der jüdischen Tradition (Frankfurt am Main: Suhrkamp, 2000), 517 pages.
- 2004 (ed.): Felix Hausdorff, Philosophisches Werk (Heidelberg: Springer, 2004), XX + 920 pages.
- 2005 (ed.): Orientierung. Philosophische Perspektiven (Frankfurt am Main: Suhrkamp, 2005), 362 pages.
- 2023 (ed., together with Reinhard G. Mueller): How Does the Digitization of Our World Change Our Orientation? Five Award-Winning Essays of the Prize Competition 2019–21 Held by the Hodges Foundation for Philosophical Orientation (Nashville, Tennessee: Orientations Press, 2023), 254 pages.
- 2025: (ed., together with Reinhard G. Mueller): How to Orient Oneself in Times of Multiple Crisis? Five Essays from the Prize Competition 2022–24 Held by the Foundation for Philosophical Orientation (Nashville, Tennessee: Orientations Press, 2025), 159 pages.
