= Broward Health =

American health system

Coordinates: 26.1024277°N 80.1407649°W

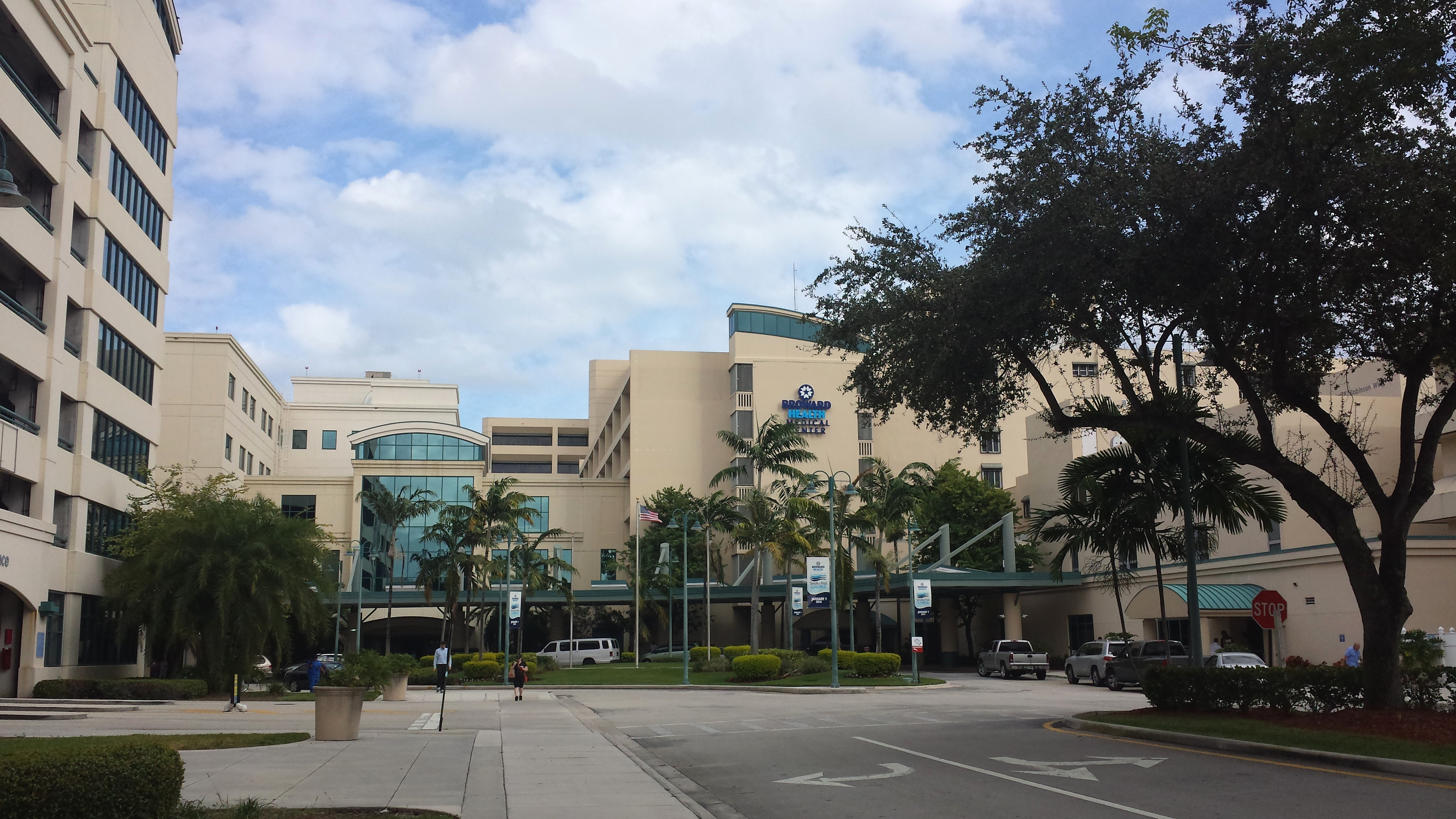
- Broward Health Medical Center in Fort Lauderdale, Florida

Geography
- Location: Broward County, Florida, United States

Organization
- Affiliated university: Nova Southeastern University College of Osteopathic Medicine

Services
- Emergency department: Level I trauma center
- Beds: 1,529

Links
- Website: www.browardhealth.org
- Lists: Hospitals in Florida

North Broward Hospital District, doing business as Broward Health, is an American health system, and is one of the 10 largest public health systems in the U.S. Located in Broward County, Florida, Broward Health has the county's first certified stroke center and liver transplant program. Broward Health currently operates more than 30 healthcare facilities, including Broward Health Medical Center (in Fort Lauderdale), Broward Health North (in Deerfield Beach), Broward Health Imperial Point (in Fort Lauderdale), Broward Health Coral Springs, Salah Foundation Broward Health Children's Hospital (in Fort Lauderdale), and Broward Health Weston.

== History ==
=== The beginnings of consolidated healthcare in Broward County ===
In the land boom of the 1920s, the Wallace Apartments were converted into the Edwards-Maxwell Hospital, which was the first hospital in Broward County. Soon, the land boom busted, followed by the September 1926 hurricane, one of the worst in county history. Due to lack of patients that were able to pay for care, the hospital was forced to close in 1929. It was reopened by Juanita Clay in 1932 and remained successful until it was purchased in 1937 by Medical Services, Inc., an insurance company owned by Dr. F.A. Brunson and M.L. Menger. Medical Services issued hospital and family insurance policies that required the use of their own hospital and doctors. The Broward County medical community rebelled, refusing to use the Medical Services hospital.

In May 1937, the Broward County Medical Association (BCMA) met to discuss plans to build a public hospital, feeling that private hospitals could not be relied upon for continuity of service and only a community-owned hospital would offer security. The consensus of the meeting was to build a hospital supported by the city, county, or a hospital district. The result of the meeting was a unanimous motion to form the Broward Hospital Association (BHA). From that point on, the BHA began its mission to raise the funds needed to build a hospital. The Chairman, James D. Camp, as well as the other members, explored every possibility of finding funds; however, government-assisted funding simply wasn't available. During this time, the county was experiencing such rapid growth, the need for facilities became critical.

=== Broward General Opens ===
After a long search, it was agreed that the Granada apartments could be remodeled into a hospital that would accommodate 45 patients, with room for acceptable operating rooms, delivery rooms, laboratories, and x-ray space.

Members of the community also joined in. Many donated their work at cost, contributing their fees to the "hospital fund." A "drive" was also implemented and equipment donated. The 45-bed hospital opened its doors as the new Broward General Hospital (now Broward Health Medical Center) and admitted its first patient on January 2, 1938.

Between 1935 and 1940, the population of Broward County grew from 20,000 to approximately 30,000. To keep up with the growth, the addition of a new wing was crucial, but without funding the expansion was difficult. Camp approached the city commission in 1940 about the need for expansion and received a favorable response for a new wing. In 1942, a South Wing was added; in 1948, the East Wing was built, raising the bed total at Broward General to 142.

In 1949, the Hospital Board returned to the City Commission to ask for funds for another wing. This time the City Commission denied the request. As a result, Camp and all members of the Board resigned.

=== The birth of the district ===
In August 1950, the Broward General Hospital Board succeeded in obtaining approval of an expansion program. A legislative act for a North Broward Hospital District was approved in 1951, and in 1952 a referendum was approved and a District Board was appointed by the governor with William J. Kelly as chairman.

Soon thereafter plans for a building on the west side were underway. The West Wing plans included two floors for patients, a new surgical unit, new kitchen and dining space to be connected to the North Wing of the hospital by a hallway. In 1955, a new lab was opened and on September 3, 1957, the City of Fort Lauderdale gave a deed of conveyance to the North Broward Hospital District. Its area of responsibility stretched the width of the county, from the Dania Canal north to the Palm Beach County line.

In 1961, an additional specialty wing brought the bed total to 468, plus 50 bassinets. The North Tower and ten-story elevator building opened in 1967; the South Tower in 1970.

=== Broward Health Today ===
Broward Health is one of the ten largest public hospital systems in the U.S. It has 7,592 employees, making it one of the largest companies in South Florida. Broward Health services all segments of the community through its four hospitals, a children's hospital, seven primary care centers, four Family Health Places, eight school-based clinics, specialty care programs, home-health services, health education programs, free and low-cost screenings, and business partnerships.

== Facilities ==
=== Broward Health North ===
By 1960, the population in Broward County grew to 350,000. Responding to the growth of the county, the District built a three-story hospital on Sample Road in Deerfield Beach, Florida. The first patient was admitted to the new Broward Health North in March 1961. Over the years, six more floors and a conference center were added. Today, the 409-bed facility is an adult Level II trauma center providing care for more than 50,000 medical emergencies and 14,000 hospitalized patients.

=== Broward Health Imperial Point ===
Broward Health Imperial Point opened in November 1972. Its 22 acres (8.9 ha) of land at the 204-bed community hospital were granted to the city of Fort Lauderdale for a community park, and today hosts a fitness area and playground. It is now known as Broward Health Imperial Point.

In the most recent year with data, Broward Health Imperial Point had 33,382 patients visit the emergency room, and 9,340 patients were admitted to the hospital. Surgeons at the hospital performed 1,707 inpatient and 5,097 outpatient surgeries.

=== Broward Health Coral Springs ===
Broward Health Coral Springs opened its doors in March 1987 and was originally called Coral Springs Medical Center. This 250-bed facility, located in Coral Springs, Florida, hosts Camp KoralKids, created in 1995, a summer day camp for children with Type-I diabetes—the only day camp of its kind in South Florida. It has since developed into a two-week camp that annually serves over 60 children. It is now known as Broward Health Coral Springs.

=== Broward Health Weston ===
Responding to a "decade of complaints from Weston residents unhappy about having to drive 20 minutes to reach a hospital", Broward Health opened Broward Health Weston (formerly Weston Regional HealthPark) on June 11, 2000. The entire project, including the 78,000-square-foot (7,200 m^{2}) building and the 10-acre (4.0 ha) land acquisition, cost $27 million.

=== Community Health Services ===
Broward Health's Community Health Services division provides healthcare in the northern two-thirds of the county.

Broward Health Community Health Services offers primary care and other services such as dental care, social services, behavioral care, immunizations, lab services, nutritional counseling, physicals, HIV research, and more. Community Health Services is composed of the following facilities; Annie L. Weaver Health Center, Bernard P. Alicki Health Center, Clínica de las Américas, Comprehensive Care Center, Comprehensive Care Center at Broward House, Cora E. Braynon Family Health Center, Lauderdale Lakes Health Center, Margate Health Center, Pompano Pediatric Primary Care Center, Pompano Prenatal Care Center, Children's Diagnostic & Treatment Center, and Specialty Care Center.

=== Broward Health Foundation ===
Established in 1999, The Broward Health Foundation is a 501(c)(3) nonprofit organization whose mission is to support the programs, projects, and initiatives of Broward Health. Donations made to the Broward Health Foundation are regularly used for a number of "medical supplies and services, including: socks and hats for newborns at Broward General Medical Center, mammograms for women who cannot afford them at Coral Springs Medical Center, medication and medical equipment for patients of Gold Coast Home Health and Hospice, improved vein finding equipment for patients at North Broward Medical Center, and educational toys and materials for children with special needs at Coral Springs Medical Center".

The Foundation is governed by a Board of Directors.

== Salah Foundation Children's Hospital ==
Salah Foundation Children's Hospital (SFCH) formerly Chris Evert Children's Hospital, is a pediatric acute care children's hospital located within Broward Health Medical Center in Fort Lauderdale, Florida. The hospital has 135 pediatric beds. It is affiliated with Nova Southeastern University College of Osteopathic Medicine, and is a member of Broward Health. The hospital provides comprehensive pediatric specialties and subspecialties to infants, children, teens, and young adults aged 0–21 throughout southeastern Florida. The hospital is also a Level 1 Pediatric Trauma Center.

== About ==
=== Leadership ===
Broward Health is overseen by a Board of Commissioners, all of whom are appointed by the Governor of Florida and confirmed by the Florida Senate. There are seven seats on the Board.

As of June 2018 there are five Commissioners serving on the Board: Andrew M. Klein, Chairman; Christopher Ure, Vice Chairman; Ray Berry, Secretary-Treasurer; Steven Wellins, and Nancy Gregoire.

Shane Strum is the current CEO of Broward Health, having been selected by the Board of Commissioners in February 2021. Mr. Strum had previously been interim CEO.

Capasso replaced Pauline Grant, the first female CEO. Grant replaced Kevin Fusco, who became interim CEO following the death of CEO Dr. Nabil El Sanadi.

Dr. El Sanadi, who became president of Broward Health in December 2014, committed suicide on January 23, 2016. El Sanadi was a practicing emergency medicine physician at Broward Health Medical Center, chief of emergency medicine for Broward Health and chairman of the Florida Board of Medicine. Several months earlier, Broward Health "reached a $69 million settlement with the federal government after it accused the district of maintaining a secret compensation system that rewarded physicians for steering referral work to the district's laboratories, imaging departments, and other services and penalized them for taking on charity cases."

=== Advances in healthcare ===
Recently, Broward General Medical Center received the Joint Commission's Ernest Amory Codman Award, which recognizes "excellence in the use of outcomes measurement to achieve improvements in the quality and safety of health care". Broward General received the award for producing better outcomes related to sedating children for diagnostic and therapeutic procedures. The process reduced the failed sedation rate by 98 percent by using a more effective sedative and initiating a standard protocol to reduce failed sedation, in addition to creating a soothing atmosphere for children.

== Hospital statistics ==
	1965	1970	1980	1990	2000	2007	2015
Admissions							
Broward Health Medical Center	16,907	23,570	24,826	19,882	21,848		
Broward Health North	2,800	3,903	4,596	5,580	3,571		
Broward Health Imperial Point	0	0	4,900	5,057	6,579		
Broward Health Coral Springs	0	0	0	7,505	11,056		
Totals	22,331	30,644	40,546	40,544	53,232	62,209	61,053
Births							
Broward Health Medical Center	2,800	3,903	4,596	5,580	3,571		
Broward Health North	0	0	0	0	0		
Broward Health Imperial Point	0	0	0	0	0		
Broward Health Coral Springs	0	0	0	2,095	2,107		
Totals	2,800	3,903	4,596	7,675	5,678	5,939	5,998
Beds							
Broward Health Medical Center	469	669	680	744	744	716	
Broward Health North	151	204	310	409	409	409	
Broward Health Imperial Point	0	0	204	204	204	204	
Broward Health Coral Springs	0	0	0	200	200	200	
Totals	620	873	1,194	1,557	1,557	1,529	1,529

== Graduate medical education ==
Broward Health operates a number of residency and fellowship programs that train both osteopathic physicians (DO) and non-osteopathic physicians (MD). Specialties include: dermatology, orthopedic surgery, family medicine, internal medicine, hospice and palliative care, pediatrics, and cardiology. The programs are all accredited by the Accreditation Council for Graduate Medical Education and American Osteopathic Association. The hospital also offers ASHP accredited pharmacy residencies supported by GME.

== See also ==
- Salah Foundation Children's Hospital
- Jackson Health System, another large government health system
