= Brian D. Ballard =

American lobbyist (born 1960s)

- Born: 1961 or 1962 (age 64–65)
- Education: University of Florida (BS, JD)
- Employer: Ballard Partners
- Political party: Republican
- Spouse: Kathryn Ballard (née Smith) (m. 1990)
- Relatives: Mary McCarty (sister)

Brian D. Ballard (born 1961 or 1962) is an American lobbyist and founder of lobbying firm Ballard Partners, based in Tallahassee, Florida. Ballard began his career working for Florida governor Bob Martinez and was his chief of staff until 1990. In 1998, Ballard founded a Florida lobbying firm, Smith & Ballard, with Jim Smith, his father-in-law and former Secretary of State of Florida. The firm became Ballard Partners when Smith left in 2011.

Ballard is a major fundraiser for Republican Party political campaigns including the presidential campaigns of John McCain, Mitt Romney, and Donald Trump. In 2017, Ballard opened an office in Washington, D.C., and became among the most powerful lobbyists on K Street, representing more than a hundred corporations and several countries. With Trump's return to the White House, Ballard again gained many clients for his federal lobbying firm.

== Early life and education ==
Brian Ballard was born to Jeanne Ray, the second-youngest of six children. He grew up in Delray Beach, Florida. He is the brother of Mary McCarty.

Ballard earned a bachelor's degree in business administration and a juris doctor degree, both from the University of Florida. At the university, Ballard was elected student body treasurer in 1985 and was a member of the Florida Blue Key, a student leadership honor society. While at the University of Florida College of Law, Ballard clerked for a law firm based in Tampa. He finished his Juris Doctor degree through a special arrangement with the university while he worked at the Florida State Capitol.

== Career ==
Ballard had paused his law school education to work as a travel aide for Bob Martinez, then mayor of Tampa, who was a candidate to become Governor of Florida. He went on to work for Martinez when he became governor, serving as his director of operations at the age of 26. Ballard was eventually appointed as Martinez's chief of staff while still in his 20s. After a decision by the Supreme Court allowing states to partially regulate abortion, Ballard pushed for a special session of Florida Legislature in an attempt to enact legislation regulating abortion. In December 1990, Ballard resigned his role as the Florida governor's chief of staff as Martinez transitioned to his new role as "national drug czar" as director of the Office of National Drug Control Policy. Ballard planned to return to Tallahassee to either work in investment banking or at a law firm but briefly went to Washington, D.C. to help establish Martinez's office for his new role.

In 1998, Ballard founded the lobbying firm Smith & Ballard with his father-in-law Jim Smith, former Secretary of State of Florida. Ballard became a lobbyist focused on the Florida Legislature which has short legislative sessions lasting only 60 days. As of 2011, Smith & Ballard represented nearly 100 clients, including U.S. Sugar and the city of Boca Raton, and brought in $1 million in revenue in the first quarter of that year. In June 2011, Smith left the firm to join Southern Strategies and the firm changed its name to Ballard Partners. In 2012, Ballard was lobbying state lawmakers for increased regulations on recovery facilities in Tallahassee for people with substance abuse issues. For years, Ballard's firm had also represented The Trump Organization in Florida.

Ballard served as the chair of the Florida finance committee for every Republican presidential candidate since the John McCain 2008 presidential campaign, including the Mitt Romney 2012 campaign. For the 2016 United States presidential election, Ballard initially supported Jeb Bush, donating $20,000 to a super PAC in support of the campaign. However, in November 2015, Ballard announced that he stopped supporting Bush, saying he "didn't sign up for a campaign that was going to be negative and attack" another Republican candidate Marco Rubio, who Ballard described as "a friend" and "a bright star of the party's future". Ballard eventually supported the campaign of Donald Trump and even became a voting member of the Electoral College. Ballard told Teen Vogue that he had received more than 600 handwritten messages urging him not to vote for Trump. According to Teen Vogue, "Ballard has been friends with Trump for years, long before [Trump] got into politics." He raised funds for Trump's campaign and inaugural committee on which Ballard served as vice chairman.

Ballard's firm had offices in Fort Lauderdale, Jacksonville, Miami, Tallahassee, Tampa, and West Palm Beach. Soon after Trump's inauguration in 2017, Ballard established an office in Washington, D.C, his firm's first outside of Florida. By the end of the year, Ballard Partners was the most powerful lobby firm on K Street. Among his firm's clients at the time were companies including Amazon, Dish Network, Pernod Ricard, Trulieve and Uber, as well as the government of Kosovo, and Moïse Katumbi, a politician in exile from the Democratic Republic of the Congo. In early 2017, Ballard received a $1.5 million contract to represent the government of Turkey, a $900,000 contract to represent the Dominican Republic, and a $240,000 contract to represent the Socialist Party of Albania. According to a disclosure to the Department of Justice under the Foreign Agents Registration Act, Ballard helped the Dominican Republic procure remdesivir from the pharmaceutical company Gilead Sciences by facilitating a connection between the Caribbean country and a deputy commissioner of the U.S. Food and Drug Association to obtain authorization for the sale. Ballard was also named a Kennedy Center trustee in December 2020.

During the Biden administration, Ballard Partners remained among the top-20 lobbying firms in Washington but business declined during those years. The firm's lobbyists included a former Democratic congressman, Robert Wexler, who joined the firm in 2017. Susie Wiles, who worked for Ballard Partners for eight years before leaving in 2019, was in charge of the Florida operations of Trump's campaign and joined the incoming second Trump administration as White House Chief of Staff in 2025. Ballard introduced Wiles to Trump during his 2016 presidential campaign. Pam Bondi, a partner at Ballard Partners since 2019, was also appointed by Trump to fill the role of United States Attorney General. For Trump's 2024 presidential campaign, Ballard also raised $50 million.

By the time Trump's second presidency began, Ballard's firm had offices in about a dozen cities on three continents. Ballard also expanded the Washington office by 5,000 square feet (460 m^{2}). With Trump's return to the White House, the firm again ascended. According to 2025 revenue figures, Ballard Partners was the largest lobbying firm in Washington, D.C. Compared to its $19 million revenue for the previous year, the firm generated $14.3 million in the first quarter of 2025 and $34 million in the first half of the year.

From November 2024 to April 2025, the firm had gained 130 new clients. Ballard's firm represented Paramount and later represented Netflix during merger negotiations in the acquisition of Warner Bros. Discovery. Ballard also represents BI² Technologies, a Massachusetts-based biometric technology company which won a $10 million contract with the United States Immigration and Customs Enforcement (ICE) agency to provide its Inmate Recognition and Identification System. In April 2025, another client of Ballard, Palantir, received $30 million for the ImmigrationOS surveillance platform which provides "near real-time data" on people ICE is pursuing. In May 2025, his firm helped secure an ICE contract worth up to $25 million for the Virginia-based SNA International to provide DNA testing of immigrants. Other companies the firm represents as of 2025 include American Express, Axel Springer SE, Bayer, Blue Origin, BMW, Chevron, Harvard University, JP Morgan, National Football League, PBS, T-Mobile, TikTok, and United Airlines.

== Personal life ==
In spring 1990, Ballard married Kathryn Smith, daughter of Jim Smith, then Secretary of State of Florida. In 2016, Ballard and his wife Kathryn, a Florida State University (FSU) alumnus, gave FSU a building in Tallahassee valued at $1.1 million to house the Jim Moran School of Entrepreneurship.
