= Carol Hanson =

American politician (1934–2017)

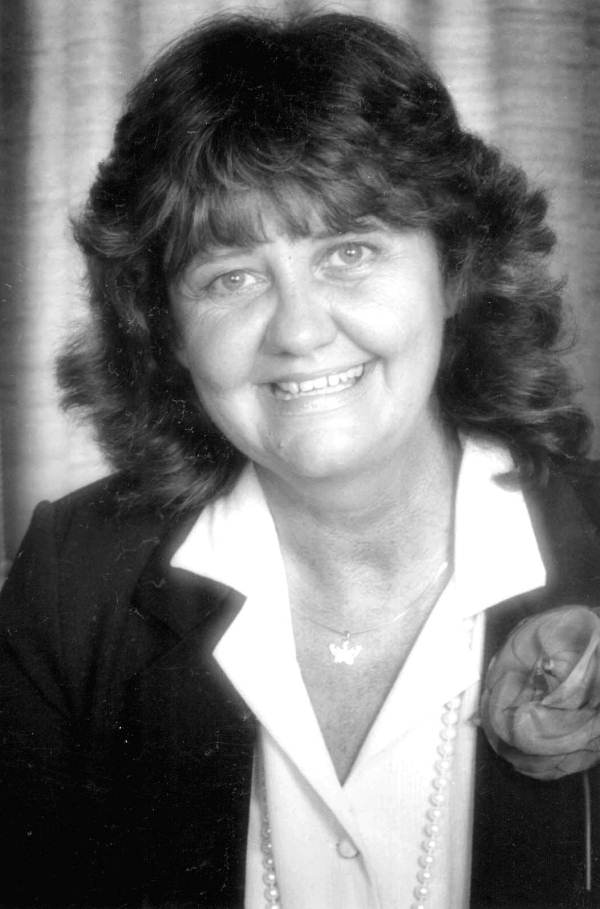

Mayor of Boca Raton, Florida
- In office April 1995 – March 31, 2001
- Preceded by: Bill Smith
- Succeeded by: Steven L. Abrams

Member of the Florida House of Representatives from the 87th district
- In office 1982–1994
- Preceded by: Robert M. Woodburn
- Succeeded by: Bill Andrews

Personal details
- Born: May 9, 1934 Utica, New York
- Died: August 22, 2017 (aged 83) Boca Raton, Florida
- Party: Republican
- Spouse: Hank V. Hanson

Carol G. Hanson (May 9, 1934 – August 22, 2017) was an American politician. Hanson served as a member of the Florida House of Representatives from 1982 to 1994 as a Republican Party. In March 1995, she was elected Mayor of Boca Raton, Florida, a nonpartisan office, serving from April 1995 until March 2001.

== Biography ==
=== Early life ===
Hanson was born in Utica, New York, on May 9, 1934 and moved to Miami, Florida, as a child. She graduated from Miami Senior High School. Hanson then moved around the state, living in Miami, Jacksonville, Fort Lauderdale, and Hollywood. In 1960, Hanson moved from Hollywood to Boca Raton due to her husband, Hank's, job transfer by his employer, Southern Bell. Hanson, who was a young mother of 2 children at the time, has described herself as initially very unhappy about the family's relocation to Boca Raton, "I was in tears because we had lived in Fort Lauderdale. We had lived in Hollywood. We had lived in Jacksonville. We had always been in big cities...I mean, I just stayed in tears."

=== Political career ===
Hanson first entered politics during the 1970s, when she fought against the amount of noise emitted by a tile manufacturer located near her home on Northeast Fourth Avenue. She was appointed as an alternate member of the city's Planning and Zoning Board, though city council did not make her a full, permanent member. That incident led to an interest in running for a seat on the city council. She was elected to the Boca Raton city council in 1979, using a tiny campaign account containing just $647. She served as a city council member for three years, from 1979 to 1982. She won re-election to the city council in 1981 and served as Vice Mayor.

Hanson was elected to the Florida House of Representatives in 1982, serving from 1982 through 1994. The Democratic Party controlled the state House at the time, while Hanson was a member of the minority Republican Party. Her greatest accomplishment in the House was the passage of the state anti-stalking law, only the second such law passed in the United States at the time.

Hanson Rep. Hanson narrowly survived the 1992 Republican primary election, defeating her opponent, Bill Andrews, by just 82 votes. On April 28, 1994, Hanson announced that she would not seek re-election to the state House and would retire.

In 1995, Carol Hanson entered a three-way race for Mayor of Boca Raton. Her opponents in the election were incumbent Mayor Bill Smith Jr., who was seeking re-election, and former Boca Raton Mayor Emil Danciu, who had previously held the office from 1987 to 1993. Smith raised $95,000 for his re-election bid, out raising Hanson, who had $25,000 in her 1995 campaign account. Still, Hanson campaigned on a message of fiscal conservatism, citing her voting record as a former state representative. In the mayoral election, held on March 14, 1995, Hanson defeated Mayor Bill Smith and former Mayor Danciu. She became Mayor in April 1995 and was re-elected to a second term in 1998. Hanson championed smaller growth, often opposing larger construction projects, arguing for the need to retain Boca Raton's small town atmosphere. She retired from office on March 31, 2001, and was succeeded by Mayor Steven L. Abrams.

She died on August 22, 2017, at the age of 83 in Boca Raton, Florida.
