= Ana Cruz =

American lobbyist

- Citizenship: American
- Occupation: Lobbyist

Ana Cruz is an American lobbyist at Ballard Partners in Tampa, Florida. She was the first Hispanic executive director of the Florida Democratic Party and was a spokesperson for Hillary Clinton’s presidential campaigns in 2008 and 2016. Cruz is known as “Tampa’s First Lady”, partner of Tampa Mayor, Jane Castor.

== Lobbying career ==
Cruz is a managing partner at Ballard Partners, Florida's largest lobbying firm. As a lobbyist, she has sought to build coalitions between government and businesses, professional sports teams, hospitals and technology companies. Cruz worked to attract technology startups to Tampa. She lobbied for Verizon’s integration of their FTTP technology in Tampa and Hillsborough County in 2006 and for Uber ride-sharing to be permitted in the Tampa area and securing federal funding for 'Connected Vehicles' in Tampa. Cruz is assigned by her firm to direct government affairs in Washington D.C. where she worked with the Biden administration on implementing progressive policies.

== Political career ==
Cruz managed her first campaign and worked various staff positions for Bill Clinton, Al Gore and Senator Bill Nelson. Cruz was the executive director of the Florida Democratic Party for two years, the youngest person and first Hispanic person in the role. Cruz was a Hillary Clinton campaign spokesperson in 2008 and 2016, and a Joe Biden campaign advisor in 2020, on the DNC’s convention platform committee as a representative for Joe Biden.

== Committees and awards ==
Cruz is on the board of the Greater Tampa Bay Chamber of Commerce, the Athena Society, the 51st Super Bowl committee. Cruz was included in "Florida's Top 100 Most Influential" by Florida Politics Magazine in 2020 and 2021.
