= Hupperath =

- Municipality
- Coat of arms

- Location of Hupperath within Bernkastel-Wittlich district
- Interactive map of Hupperath
- Location within Germany Location within Rhineland-Palatinate
- Coordinates: 49°59′50.72″N 06°50′11.6″E
- Country: Germany
- State: Rhineland-Palatinate
- District: Bernkastel-Wittlich
- Municipal assoc.: Wittlich-Land

Government
  - Mayor (2019–24): Patrick Simon

Area
  - Total: 4.11 km^{2} (1.59 sq mi)
- Elevation: 337 m (1,106 ft)

Population (2025-12-31)
  - Total: 648
  - Density: 158/km^{2} (408/sq mi)
- Time zone: UTC+01:00 (CET)
  - Summer (DST): UTC+02:00 (CEST)
- Postal codes: 54518
- Dialling codes: 06571
- Vehicle registration: WIL
- Website: www.hupperath.de

Hupperath (in Eifel dialect: Hauperth) is an Ortsgemeinde – a municipality belonging to a Verbandsgemeinde, a kind of collective municipality – in the Bernkastel-Wittlich district in Rhineland-Palatinate, Germany.

== Geography ==
The municipality lies in the Eifel and belongs to the Verbandsgemeinde of Wittlich-Land, whose seat is in Wittlich, although that town is itself not in the Verbandsgemeinde.

== History ==
In 1137, Hupperath had its first documentary mention as Humbrecterod. Beginning in 1794, Hupperath lay under French rule. In 1814 it was assigned to the Kingdom of Prussia at the Congress of Vienna. Since 1947, it has been part of the then newly founded state of Rhineland-Palatinate.

== Politics ==
=== Municipal council ===
The council is made up of 12 council members, who were elected by majority vote proportional representation at the municipal election held on 7 June 2009, and the honorary mayor as chairman.

The municipal election held on 7 June 2009 yielded the following results:

	SPD	WG Dresen	WG Konrad	Total
2009	3	5	4	12 seats

=== Coat of arms ===
The German blazon reads: Von Grün und Silber geteilt. In Grün ein 12endiges, silbernes Hirschgeweih mit Grind, einschließend ein silbernes Kreuz, in Silber 2 schragenförmig gekreuzte blaue Rodehacken mit schwarzen Stielen.

The municipality's arms might in English heraldic language be described thus: Per fess vert a stag's attires each pointed of six fixed to the scalp, between them a Latin cross, all argent, and argent two clearing hoes in saltire azure helved sable.

== Culture and sightseeing ==
=== Clubs ===
Hupperath currently has at its disposal a music club, a sport club (Spielvereinigung Minderlittgen-Hupperath e. V.), a men's singing club (together with Minderlittgen), a volunteer fire brigade and a youth fire brigade.

=== Regular events ===
- Neujahrsrock (“New Year’s Rock”): a rock event held each year on the first weekend in January. The event is organized by the Hupperath music club.
- Kappensitzung: a Carnival event staged by the volunteer fire brigade
- Music club's Concert Evening: This is held once yearly in November.
- Fat Thursday (locally known as Weiberdonnerstag): Children's Carnival in the afternoon, after which comes a colourful evening with Carnival speeches and sketches.

=== Ferien am Ort ===
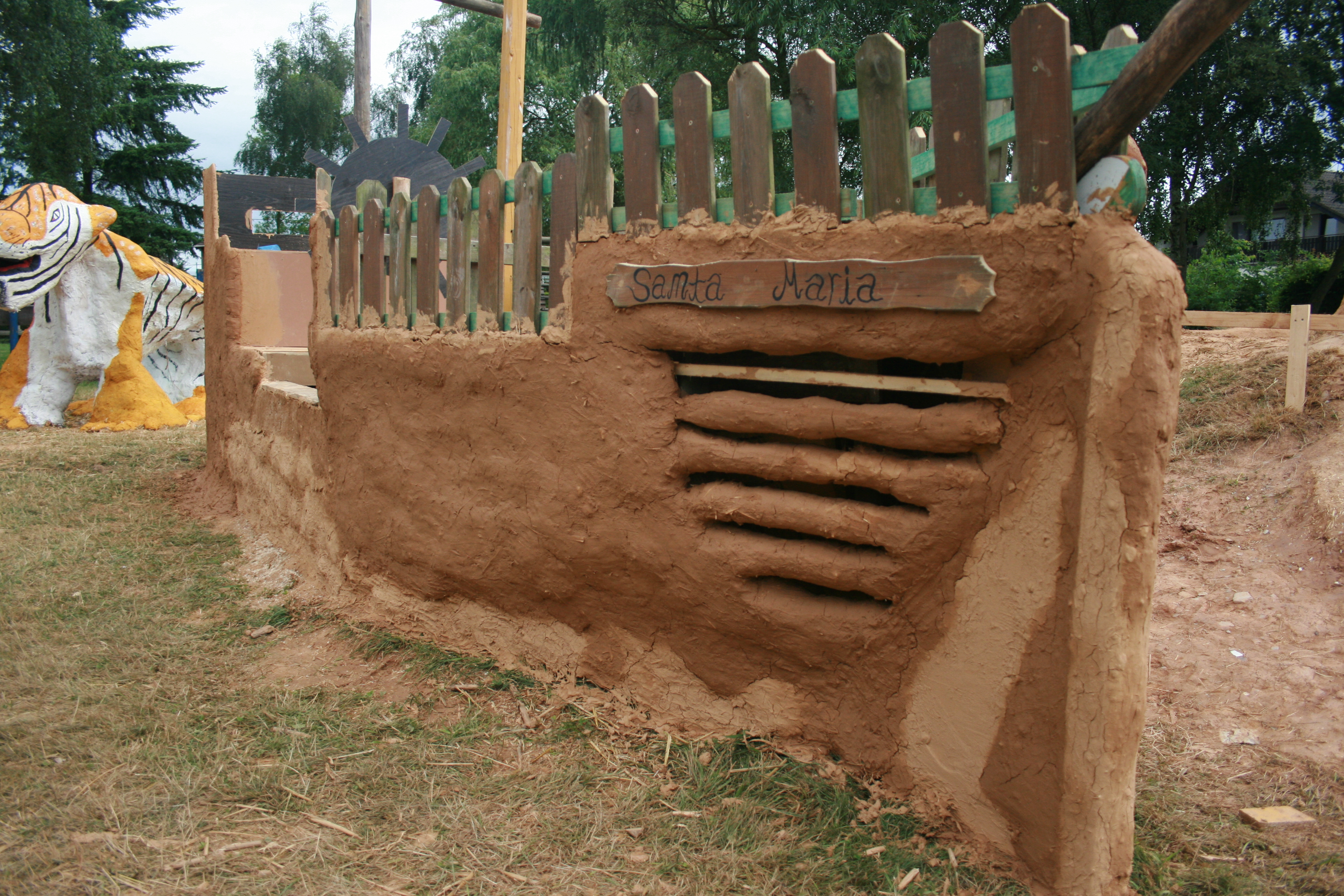
A ship built out of loam

The leisure week Ferien am Ort (roughly “Holiday in Town”) is staged by the Minderlittgen/Hupperath Spielvereinigung (“game union”). It offers youngsters varied leisure activities during the summer holidays. Ferien am Ort, also known as Lehmdorf (“Loam Village” – daily, figures and buildings are made out of loam), has a new motto every year (in 2008: In 7 Tagen um die Welt – “Around the world in 7 days”).

== Notable people ==
Josef Simon (1930–2016), German philosopher
