= Salah Foundation Children's Hospital =

Children's hospital in Fort Lauderdale, Florida, U.S.

- Broward Health

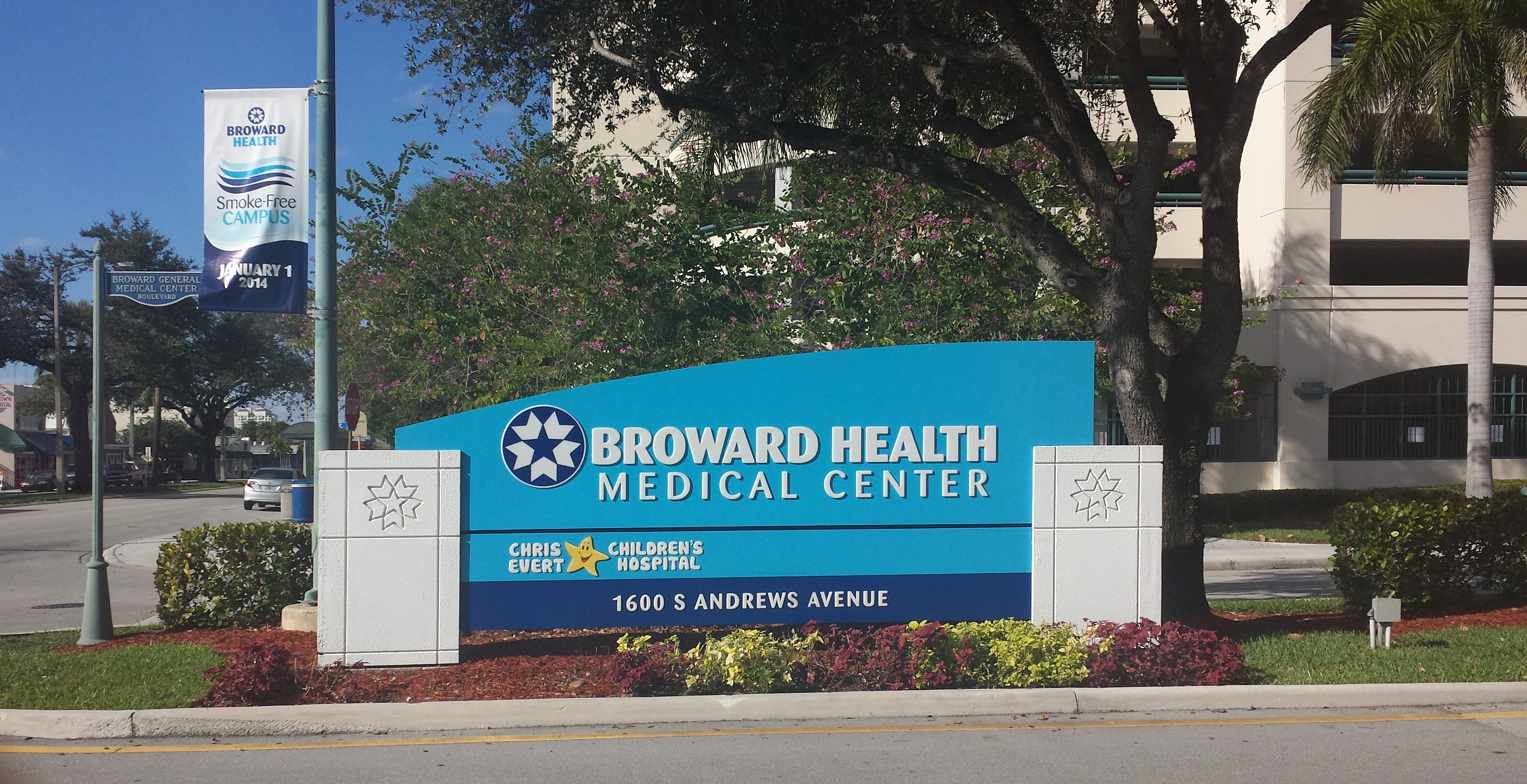
- Entrance sign before the name change.

Geography
- Location: 1600 S. Andrews Avenue, Fort Lauderdale, Florida, United States
- Coordinates: 26.102253577536267°N 80.14078357660973°W

Organization
- Type: Children's hospital
- Affiliated university: Nova Southeastern College of Osteopathic Medicine

Services
- Emergency department: Level I Pediatric Trauma Center
- Beds: 135

Helipads
- Helipad: FAA LID: 6FD8 (Shared with Broward Health)
Number	Length		Surface
Number	ft	m	Surface
H1	60 x 60	18 × 18	concrete

History
- Former name: Chris Evert Children's Hospital
- Opened: 1996

Links
- Website: www.browardhealth.org/locations/salah-foundation-childrens-hospital
- Lists: Hospitals in the United States

Salah Foundation Children's Hospital (SFCH), formerly Chris Evert Children's Hospital, is a pediatric acute care children's hospital located within Broward Health Medical Center in Fort Lauderdale, Florida, United States. The hospital has 135 pediatric beds. It is affiliated with Nova Southeastern University College of Osteopathic Medicine, and is a member of Broward Health. The hospital provides comprehensive pediatric specialties and subspecialties to infants, children, teens, and young adults aged 0–21 throughout southeastern Florida. The hospital is also a Level I Pediatric Trauma Center.

The Broward Health Children's Hospital at Broward Health Medical Center was originally named after Broward native Chris Evert, before being renamed the "Salah Foundation Broward Health Children's Hospital." The hospital is one of less than 200 facilities recognized in the United States by the National Association of Children's Hospitals.

== History ==
Pediatric services at Broward Health Medical Center date back to the founding of the medical center in 1938. In 1996 Broward Health expanded their pediatric services and opened up a full service pediatric "hospital within a hospital."

In 2006, the children's hospital opened a newly renovated, expanded pediatric sedation unit, the only one in Broward County. The pediatric sedation unit specializes in the safest techniques for pediatric sedation.

In November 2007, the Chris Evert Children's Hospital at Broward General received the Ernest Amory Codman Award for their advances in pediatric sedation.

In January 2013 local NHL team, the Florida Panthers announced a $400,000 commitment towards the renovation of the neonatal intensive care unit at the hospital, with $100,000 of the donation going towards the pediatric hematology/oncology unit.

In 2013 doctors at the hospital pioneered the use of a high-powered camera that is able to detect early changes that can lead to blindness or cancer in neonatal patients.

In September 2014, the officials from the Chris Evert Children's Hospital announced a $10 million "challenge grant" from the Salah Foundation. If Broward Health was able to raise $10 million before July 2016, Salah Foundation would match. Also in 2014, local philanthropist, Lorraine Thomas donated $1.5 million to the hospital's pediatric hematology/oncology unit, resulting in the hospital naming the floor after Thomas.

In 2015 the hospital began a multi-phased expansion and renovation of all of their pediatric units. The expansion/renovation was contracted out to Swedish firm, Skanska who was awarded a contract of $27.5 million. Also in 2015, the hospital received a $2 million donation from Sunrise based, Pediatrix Medical Group. The project included renovations to 102,000 square feet of space at the hospital.

On October 1, 2016, the name of the hospital was officially changed from "Chris Evert Children's Hospital" to the "Salah Foundation Children's Hospital" after the Salah Foundation matched fundraising efforts and donated $10 million to the renovation.

In 2018 the hospital was the runner up for best pediatric emergency department in Broward County (after Joe DiMaggio Children's Hospital) on the South Florida Parenting Magazine's 2017 Kids Crown Awards.

The expansion was completed in 2018 with the addition of the addition of 30 new rooms in the neonatal intensive care unit (NICU), 12 beds in the pediatric intensive care unit (PICU), 20 new beds in the pediatric step-down unit, and 12 in the pediatric oncology and hematology units. The NICU consists of a mix of private Level II and Level III rooms.

In addition to the creation of bed space, the renovations redesigned current pediatric units to include nautical design themes throughout featuring different sea creatures.

The cost of the entire set of renovations and expansions totaled out to be $52 million with a majority of the funds provided by the Broward Health Foundation.

In December 2020 the hospital (along with Broward Health Medical Center) was approved as a kidney transplant center by the United Network for Organ Sharing.

== About ==
Along with Broward Health Medical Center, Salah Foundation Children's Hospital is a Level I Trauma Center and has a helipad for critical transport of pediatric patients to and from the hospital.

=== Ronald McDonald House ===
SFCH is affiliated with the Ronald McDonald House of South Florida (RMHSF) to provide housing for parents of children under 21 who live outside of the area. Previously, a Ronald McDonald house existed near the campus, (Fort Lauderdale Ronald McDonald House) but after the renovation of SFCH allowed for the addition of 22 family bedrooms within the hospital, use of the local Ronald McDonald House fell to an all-time low. In January 2018 the Fort Lauderdale Ronald McDonald House closed leaving the next closest one in Miami (RMHSF).

=== Patient care units ===
The hospital has a few units of all private patient rooms to care for pediatric patients of all ages.

- 63-bed Level III Neonatal Intensive Care Unit
- 12-bed Pediatric Intensive Care Unit
- 50-bed General Pediatric/Oncology

== See also ==
- Broward Health
- Nova Southeastern University College of Osteopathic Medicine
- Chris Evert
- List of children's hospitals in the United States
