= Michael LaRosa =

American lobbyist and political advisor

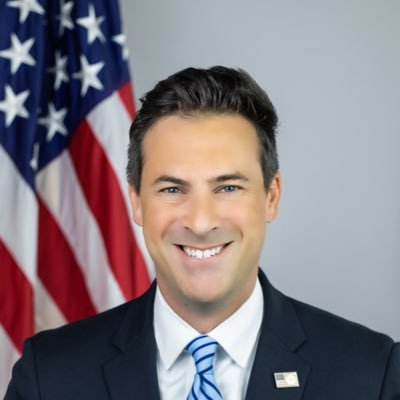
- Official portrait, 2022

Press Secretary for the First Lady
- In office January 20, 2021 – July 31, 2022
- President: Joe Biden
- First Lady: Jill Biden
- Preceded by: Stephanie Grisham (2020)

Personal details
- Party: Democratic
- Education: Seton Hall University (BA); American University (MA)

Michael LaRosa is an American lobbyist and political strategist who formerly served as the press secretary for the First Lady in the Biden administration from 2021 to 2022. LaRosa previously worked as a spokesman for Jill Biden and the Joe Biden 2020 presidential campaign. Since 2023 he has been a partner at Ballard Partners, a lobbying firm known for its ties to Donald Trump. Prior to his career in politics, LaRosa worked as a television producer for Hardball with Chris Matthews on MSNBC.

== Education ==
LaRosa graduated from Easton Area High School in 2002. He earned a Bachelor of Arts degree in political science and communications from Seton Hall University and a Master of Arts in political science and government from American University. During high school and college, LaRosa was a competitive swimmer.

== Career ==
LaRosa began his career in politics as an intern for Hillary Clinton's re-election campaign for the United States Senate. He later worked as a personal assistant to Representative Melissa Bean and as a scheduler for Senator Kirsten Gillibrand. He also worked as special assistant to the deputy director of the United States Office of Personnel Management.

LaRosa worked as a segment producer and writer for Hardball with Chris Matthews. From 2017 to 2019, he was the communications director for Senator Maria Cantwell. He was also the communications director for the United States Senate Committee on Energy and Natural Resources. From April to November 2019, he was the deputy director of the House Democratic Policy and Communications Committee. He joined the Joe Biden 2020 presidential campaign in November 2019, working as chief spokesman and traveling press secretary for Jill Biden. In January 2021, LaRosa was selected to serve as Press Secretary for the First Lady in the incoming Biden administration. On July 31, 2022, LaRosa resigned as press secretary for First Lady, taking a job with the lobbying firm Penta Group (then known as Hamilton Place Strategies) as managing director for strategy.

Since September 2023, LaRosa has been a partner at Ballard Partners, a lobbying firm which is known for its ties to the Trump Administration.
