= Mary McCarty =

American politician (born 1954)

- Born: December 8, 1954 (age 71)
- Education: University of Florida
- Occupation: Politician
- Spouse: Kevin McCarty
- Relatives: Brian D. Ballard (brother)

Mary Ballard McCarty (born December 8, 1954) is a politician and former County Commissioner in Palm Beach County, Florida, and served in office from November 1990 until resigning for corruption, announced on January 8, 2009. McCarty resigned from the Board of County Commissioners after she pleaded guilty to one count of honest services fraud. The charges stemmed from votes on projects that indirectly benefited her husband, Kevin McCarty a former employee of Raymond James, without the required disclosure and she received reduced hotel rates from a company that did business with Palm Beach County.

Prior to joining the County Commission, McCarty was elected to the Delray Beach, Florida City Commission; she was first elected to the post in 1987 at the age of 32. In December 2000 McCarty became the chair of the Palm Beach County Republican Party. and served two years.

After pleading guilty, McCarty served 21 months of a 3½-year prison sentence. After being released from a Texas prison, McCarty and her husband (who also served prison time) returned to Palm Beach County and jointly started a management consulting business. Mary McCarty also opened a life coaching business.

== Early life, education and family ==
Mary Ballard McCarty was born in Chicago, Illinois on December 8, 1954, the eldest of six children. One of his brothers, Brian D. Ballard, became lobbyist and founder of lobbying firm Ballard Partners. The family lived there for a time in Arlington Heights and Northbrook, both suburbs of Chicago. In 1969, McCarty's family moved to Spooner, Wisconsin, where McCarty graduated from Spooner High School in June, 1972. In the same month, McCarty's family moved to Delray Beach, Florida. McCarty started attending the University of Florida in 1973. She began her career in politics as an intern for U.S. House Majority Leader Tip O'Neill in Washington D.C. in 1974 and helped to monitor the Watergate Hearings. She worked as a waitress to help pay for college.

McCarty graduated from the University of Florida in 1977 with a bachelor's degree in journalism. McCarty went on to work in many capacities in the restaurant industry including, waiting tables, bar-tending, and management. McCarty is married to Kevin McCarty

In 1986, McCarty co-chaired the Delray Beach 75th Diamond Jubilee, a month-long city anniversary celebration.

== Public office ==
From 1987 - 1990, she was a City Commissioner and Vice-Mayor of Delray Beach. From November 1990 until her 2009 resignation, she was a county commissioner of Palm Beach County. In 2002, CEO Magazine named her as one of the "100 Most Powerful People in South Florida".

== Federal felony conviction ==
On January 8, 2009, McCarty resigned from office after 18 years and pleaded guilty to one count of conspiracy to commit honest services fraud. The charges stemmed from votes on projects that indirectly benefited her husband’s employer without the required disclosure and failed to disclose that she received reduced hotel rates from a company that did business with the county (in establishing a Palm Beach County Convention Center hotel).

In June 2009, U.S. District Judge Donald M. Middlebrooks sentenced McCarty to 42 months in federal prison, to be followed by three years of supervised release. McCarty served her sentence at the Federal Prison Camp, Bryan in Texas. She ultimately served 21 months in prison.

Her husband, Kevin also pleaded guilty to a misprision of a felony for not reporting his wife’s crimes to authorities. He was sentenced to 8 months and spent 5 months in Miami Federal Prison Camp, serving the remaining time under Halfway House supervision.

== Life after prison ==
After being released from a Texas prison, McCarty and her husband (who also served prison time) returned to Palm Beach County and jointly started a management consulting business. Mary McCarty also opened a life coaching business.

== Presidential pardon ==
December 2020 pardon granted by Donald Trump

On December 23, 2020, McCarty received a full pardon from President Donald Trump.
