= Susan Whelchel =

American politician (1944–2022)

Mayor of Boca Raton, Florida
- In office April 2008 – March 31, 2014
- Preceded by: Steven L. Abrams
- Succeeded by: Susan Haynie

Personal details
- Born: August 13, 1944 Baxley, Georgia, U.S.
- Died: August 5, 2022 (aged 77)
- Party: Republican
- Spouse: John Whelchel
- Children: 4

Susan Whelchel (August 13, 1944 – August 5, 2022) was an American politician and teacher. She served two terms as the Mayor of the city of Boca Raton, Florida, from 2008 until 2014.

Whelchel received a Bachelor of Science from Jacksonville University. She was a former teacher. Before becoming mayor, Whelchel served on the Boca Raton city council, a member of the Community Redevelopment Agency, and a member of the local school board.

Whelchel was elected Mayor of Boca Raton in 2008 unopposed, succeeding outgoing Mayor Steven L. Abrams, who was term limited. She took office in April 2008. The 2008 mayoral election marked the first time that a candidate had run unopposed for mayor since 1978, when Boca Raton voters began electing their mayor directly.

Initially, it appeared that Whelchel would again run for re-election unopposed in 2011, but a second candidate, Linda Spurling Gruneisen, filed to run just before the deadline. Whelchel defeated Spurling Gruneisen by a nine to one margin in the mayoral election held on March 8, 2011, to win a second, three-year term. Whelchel received 3,903 votes (85.37%), while Spurling Gruneisen garnered 669 votes (14.63%).

Under Whelchel, Boca Raton installed red light cameras, as well as the city's first parking meters. In addition, she advocated for the use of green technology in building construction, opposed tax increases, and advocated for cuts to city spending. During her second term, Whelchel promised to focus on job creation and the revitalization of downtown Boca Raton.

Whelchel, who was term limited and ineligible to run for mayor again, left office in March 2014. She was succeeded by then-Deputy Mayor Susan Haynie.

Whelchel died from Alzheimer's disease on August 5, 2022, at the age of 77.
