= Online Lenders Alliance =

Industry association

The Online Lenders Alliance (OLA) is an industry association that represents members of the online financial services community. The OLA sets best practices and standards for online lending businesses and monitors the Internet for bad actors operating in the field. OLA members account for an estimated 80% of the nation's small-dollar online lending volume.

== History ==
In addition to setting industry standards, the OLA has been lobbying on issues related to hidden interest rates created by malicious online lenders, and industry concerns related to online advertising.
