= Josef Simon =

German philosopher (1930–2016)

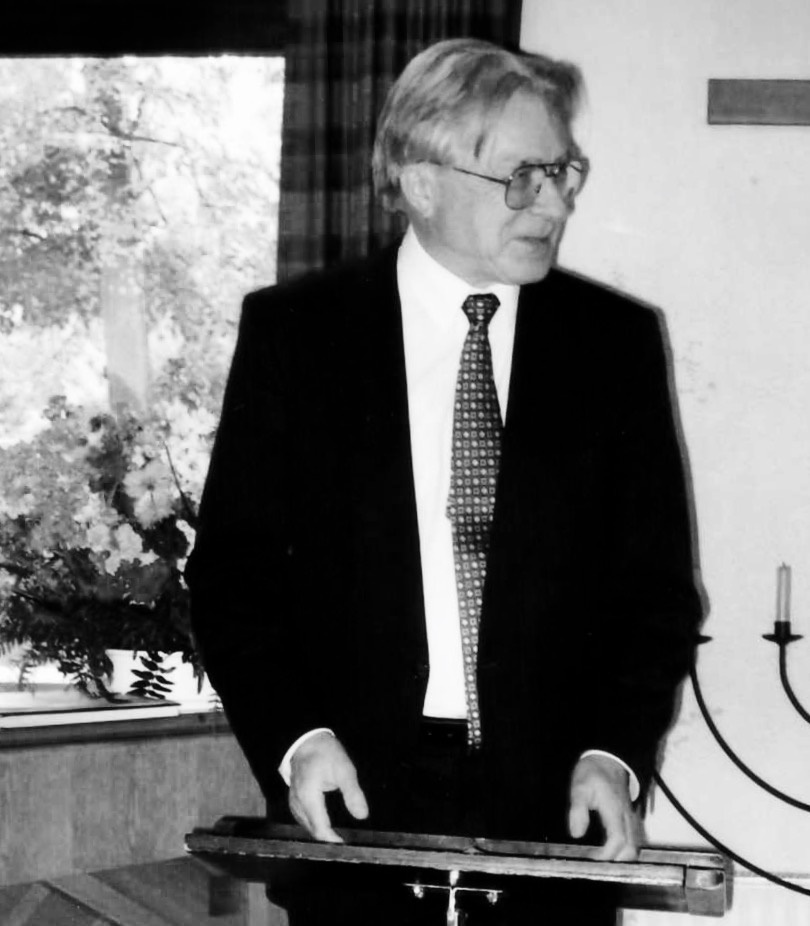
- Simon in Reichelsheim
- Born: August 1, 1930; Hupperath
- Died: March 28, 2016 (aged 85); Bonn
- Occupation: Philosopher

Josef Simon (1 August 1930 – 28 March 2016) was a contemporary German philosopher and professor of the University of Bonn, born in Hupperath. He wrote extensively on metaphysics, epistemology, the philosophy of German idealism and various philosophers, mainly Kant, Hamann and Nietzsche. Perhaps Simon's most influential work has been in the philosophy of language. His main work, Philosophie des Zeichens, has been influenced by, among others, Kant, Hegel, Peirce and Wittgenstein, Hamann, Humboldt or Nietzsche.

He died in Bonn.

== Selected publications ==
Das Problem der Sprache bei Hegel. Kohlhammer Verlag, Stuttgart 1966.

Sprache und Raum. Philosophische Untersuchungen zum Verhältnis zwischen Wahrheit und Bestimmtheit von Sätzen. Verlag Walter de Gruyter, Berlin 1969.

Sprachphilosophische Aspekte der Kategorienlehre. Heiderhoff Verlag, Frankfurt/Main 1971

Philosophie und linguistische Theorie. Verlag Walter de Gruyter, Berlin/New York 1971.

Wahrheit als Freiheit. Zur Entwicklung der Wahrheitsfrage in der neueren Philosophie. Verlag Walter de Gruyter, Berlin/New York 1978.

Sprachphilosophie, Karl Alber Verlag, Freiburg/München 1981.

Philosophie des Zeichens. Verlag Walter de Gruyter, Berlin/New York 1989. English translation: Philosophy of the Sign. State University of New York Press, 1995. Spanish translation: Filosofia del signo. Gredos, Madrid 1998.

Kant. Die fremde Vernunft und die Sprache der Philosophie. Verlag Walter de Gruyter, Berlin/New York 2003.

Philosophie als Verdeutlichung. Abhandlungen zu Erkennen, Sprache und Handeln. Herausgegeben von Thomas Sören Hoffmann, Verlag Walter de Gruyter, Berlin/New York 2010.
