= Shane Strum =

American healthcare executive and political advisor

President and CEO of Broward Health
- Incumbent
- Assumed office March 2021
- Preceded by: Gino Santorio

Interim CEO of Memorial Healthcare System
- Incumbent
- Assumed office 2024

Personal details
- Born: Broward County, Florida, U.S.
- Party: Republican
- Education: University of Alabama (BA); Nova Southeastern University (MBA)
- Occupation: Healthcare executive, political advisor
- Known for: Chief of Staff to Ron DeSantis; CEO of Broward Health

Shane Strum is an American healthcare executive and political advisor who currently serves as the President and Chief Executive Officer (CEO) of Broward Health, a public health system based in Broward County, Florida. In 2024, he was also named CEO of Memorial Healthcare System, one of the largest public healthcare systems in Florida.

Strum previously held several senior roles in Florida government, including serving as Chief of Staff to Governor Ron DeSantis and to former Governor Charlie Crist. He also served in the Florida Department of Management Services and was involved in multiple gubernatorial transition teams.

As a healthcare leader, Strum has been credited with overseeing financial improvements, service expansions, and academic partnerships at Broward Health. His work in both public administration and healthcare has been recognized by regional and national organizations, including the South Florida Business Journal and Becker’s Hospital Review.

== Early life and education ==
Shane Strum was raised in Broward County, Florida, where he attended local schools and became active in community and civic life from a young age. His early experiences in the region later informed both his public service career and leadership roles in the local healthcare sector. Specific details about his family background or upbringing have not been widely reported in independent sources.

Strum earned a bachelor's degree from the University of Alabama, followed by a master's degree in business administration from Nova Southeastern University. His academic background in business and public administration laid the foundation for his subsequent roles in both government and healthcare leadership.

== Political career ==
=== Early political involvement ===
Strum began his career in public service in South Florida, where he held various roles in local and regional government and politics. He served as Chief of Staff to Florida Governor Charlie Crist during Crist’s term from 2007 to 2011. Strum was also involved in political strategy and campaign operations in the state, including advisory roles in gubernatorial transition teams. His early work focused on administrative policy, budgeting, and operational reforms within state government.

=== Roles in Florida governors' administrations ===
After serving under Governor Charlie Crist, Strum later joined the administration of Governor Ron DeSantis, where he was appointed as Chief of Staff in 2019. In that capacity, he was responsible for overseeing the operations of the executive office and coordinating policy across state agencies. During his tenure, Strum was involved in various aspects of state governance, including budget planning, agency leadership appointments, and public health coordination.

Strum also participated in the transition team for Governor Rick Scott following the 2010 election, providing strategic guidance during the formation of the new administration.

=== Political influence and policy areas ===
As Chief of Staff to Governor DeSantis, Strum played a behind-the-scenes role in shaping executive policy and administrative priorities in Florida. While not a public-facing official, he was reported to have been influential in key decisions related to state budgeting, healthcare policy, and emergency response coordination. His administrative style emphasized agency accountability and streamlined operations across departments.

Strum’s experience in both public administration and healthcare informed his policy approach, particularly during the early stages of the COVID-19 pandemic. He worked closely with state agencies to coordinate resource allocation and emergency health responses, though his specific role in policy formation was not widely publicized.

== Healthcare administration ==
=== Appointment to Broward Health ===
In March 2021, Strum was appointed President and Chief Executive Officer of Broward Health, one of the largest public healthcare systems in the United States. His selection followed a national search and marked a transition from his previous roles in state government to healthcare administration. Broward Health's board cited his experience in public service and executive leadership as qualifications for the position.

At the time of his appointment, Broward Health was undergoing operational restructuring and sought leadership with a background in both administration and policy. Strum’s hiring was covered by regional media and healthcare industry publications, noting the strategic importance of the role within South Florida’s medical landscape.

=== Initiatives and achievements at Broward Health ===
During Strum's tenure at Broward Health, the system reported financial improvements, including a significant increase in net operating revenue and upgraded credit ratings from Fitch, Moody’s, and S&P. These changes were part of broader efforts to stabilize the organization’s finances and improve operational efficiency.

Strum also oversaw the expansion of clinical services, including the development of advanced cardiology programs and the addition of new primary and specialty care access points throughout Broward County. Under his leadership, Broward Health established academic partnerships with Florida Atlantic University and the University of Florida to introduce new residency programs and enhance physician training in the region.

These initiatives were aimed at addressing healthcare workforce shortages and expanding access to care in underserved areas. Coverage from industry publications noted the system's progress under Strum’s leadership while also highlighting ongoing challenges in public health infrastructure.

=== CEO of Memorial Healthcare System ===
In 2024, Strum was appointed Chief Executive Officer of Memorial Healthcare System, one of the largest public healthcare providers in Florida. The appointment was made while a national search was underway to identify a permanent CEO. At the time, Strum continued to serve concurrently as President and CEO of Broward Health.

During his interim period, Memorial Healthcare System (MHS) and Broward Health launched the "Better Together" initiative, a collaboration aimed at improving access to primary and maternal healthcare services in underserved areas of Broward County. The initiative received attention from state and local media as a model for public health cooperation and care coordination.

Strum's dual leadership role was described by stakeholders as a temporary solution to ensure stability and strategic alignment between the two major healthcare systems during a period of administrative transition.

== Affiliations and boards ==
Strum serves on the board of the Safety Net Hospital Alliance of Florida, an organization representing Florida’s public and teaching hospitals. In this role, he contributes to policy discussions and advocacy efforts related to healthcare access and funding for vulnerable populations.

He also chairs the policy committee of America’s Essential Hospitals, a national organization focused on healthcare systems that provide a high level of care to uninsured and underserved communities. His involvement reflects an ongoing engagement with statewide and national healthcare policy, particularly in areas related to public health infrastructure and system-level coordination.

== Awards and honors ==
Awards and honors include:

- Inducted into the Fort Lauderdale Walk of Fame in 2023 for contributions to the local community.
- Named a “Power Leader in Healthcare” by the South Florida Business Journal.
- Included on Becker’s Hospital Review’s 2025 list of “Great Healthcare Leaders to Know.”

== See also ==
- Charlie Crist
- Healthcare in Florida
- Ron DeSantis
- Broward Health
