= Paragon Systems =

Private security and investigation firm

Paragon Systems Inc. is a United States-based private security and investigation firm headquartered in Herndon, Virginia. Paragon Systems is a subsidiary of Securitas.

== Overview ==
In April 2008, Paragon Systems was awarded a $56 million contract from the United States Department of Homeland Security. Paragon took over the contract from USProtect and provided security services for federal government facilities.

In December 2006, the company reportedly lost accountability of four Glock 23 pistols from their armory at the DHS headquarters facility.

In 2016 employees at Paragon Systems went on strike with employees citing ”work rules” as the reason.

In November 2024, the company settled a $52 million lawsuit with the United States Department of Justice for their participation in a kickback scheme.
