= Hyperice =

American health technology company

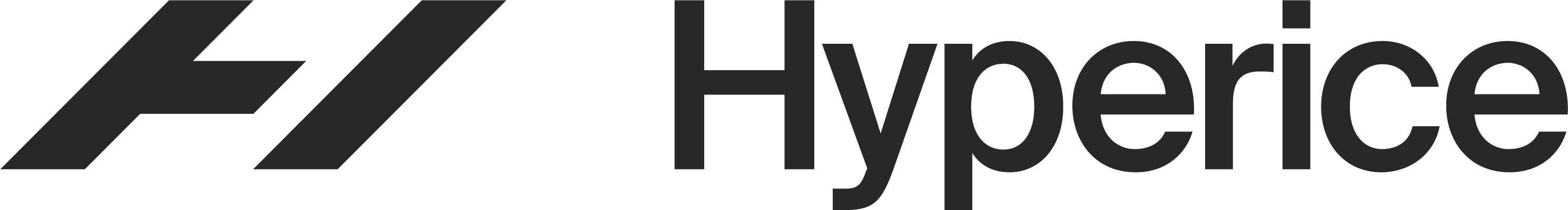

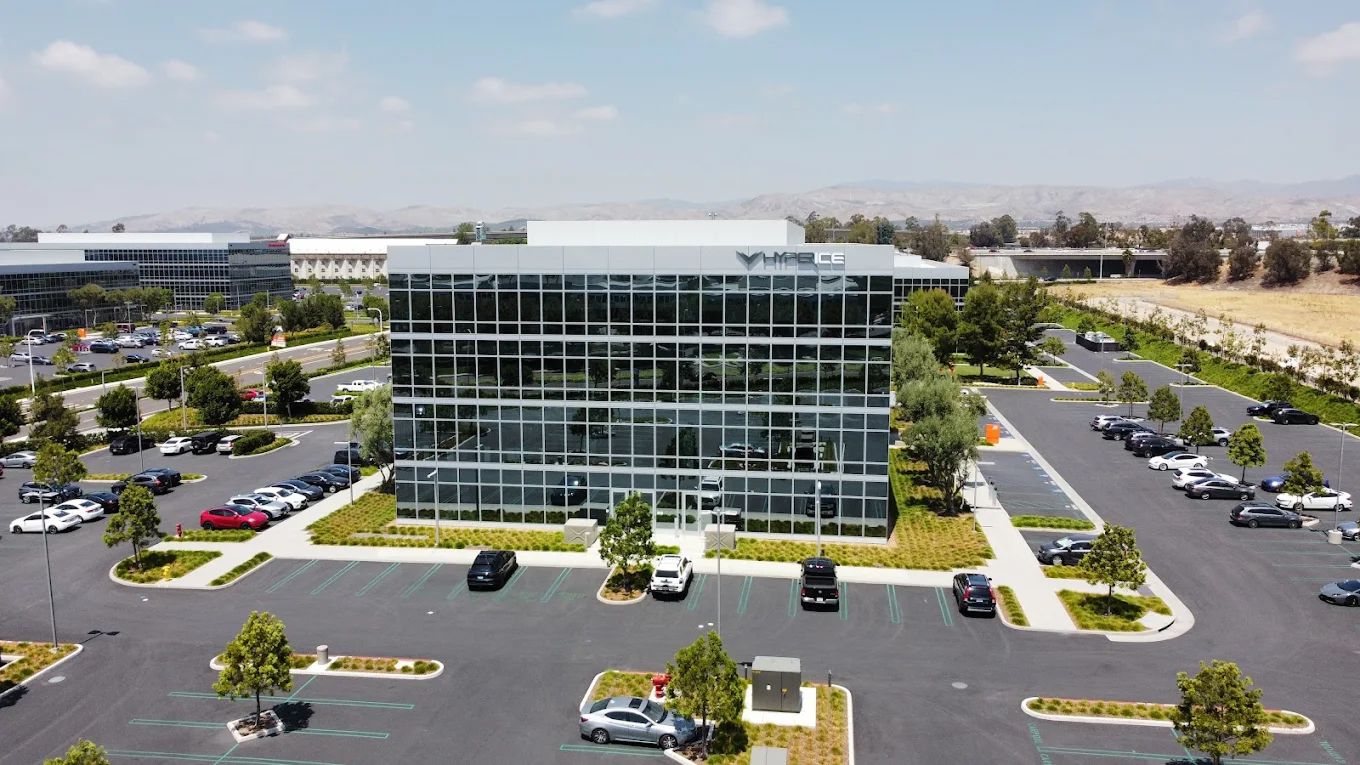
- Industry: Body recovery systems
- Founded: 2010
- Founder: Anthony Katz
- Headquarters: Irvine, California, United States
- Website: http://hyperice.com/

Hyperice is an American health technology company founded in 2010. It designs and manufactures products for recovery and movement enhancement.

The company is headquartered in Irvine, California.

== History ==
Hyperice was founded by Anthony Katz in Southern California in 2010. Its first product was an ice-compression wrap to help with sports-related injuries. Kobe Bryant, the American professional basketball player, became the first recipient of the Hyperice Knee ice and compression wrap.

Hyperice launched a Kickstarter campaign in 2014 and a year later, mass-produced the Vyper 1. That same year, the Hypersphere- a vibrating fitness and recover device- was released. Blake Griffin and Lindsey Vonn served as ambassadors for Hypersphere for pre- and post-training sessions.

In 2016, the company started production of Venom, a heat and vibration wearable back device for muscle warm-up and recovery. Later in 2017, it launched Venom Leg and Venom Shoulder products.

In 2018, Hyperice introduced Hypervolt 1, a portable percussion massage gun. In 2019, the company expanded its product line with the launch of the Hypersphere Mini and Hypervolt Plus.

In 2020, Hyperice acquired Normatec, known for developing a popular recovery system used by professional athletes. During 2020, the company introduced some other products, Hypervolt Bluetooth/Hypervolt Plus Bluetooth and the Hypervolt Go, along with the Hyperice app, which enables the devices to connect for automatic speed control and access to specialized content series. Also in 2020, Hyperice signed a deal with the NBA for a season ahead of the brand's original timeline because of the advantages afforded to the brand by the 'NBA Bubble'.

Following its sponsorship agreement with the NBA in July, Hyperice signed a new deal with the National Football League (NFL) in November, becoming the league’s first official recovery technology partner.

Through the partnership with the PGA TOUR, Hyperice changed the on-course rules to allow players access to percussion massage during competitive play. At the same time, Hyperice raised $48 million in a new round of investments and had a valuation of $700 million.

In 2021, the company approved the purchase of Recoverx, a San Diego-based technology company specializing in intelligent contrast technologies, as well as Core, a mental wellness company.

In 2021 Hyperice rebranded itself as a comprehensive high-performance wellness brand, unveiling a new logo and vision. The company launched several innovative devices, including the Hyperice X, Hypervolt 2 Pro, Hypervolt 2, Vyper 3, and Vyper Go.

In 2022, Hyperice launched a series of new innovations and updated several existing devices on the market: Normatec 3, Normatec Go, Venom Go, and the Venom 2.

In 2023, Hyperice signed a partnership with WHOOP, the human performance company, for data integration. Through the WHOOP app, users can track their body's recovery levels when using the Hypervolt line of percussion massage devices and Normatec dynamic air compression systems.

That same year, the company signed another partnership agreement with Westin Hotels & Resorts to incorporate Hyperice compression and massage products—specifically designed for post-workout recovery—into the “WestinWORKOUT Gear Lending” program. This initiative was introduced as a new service for guests at over 230 Westin properties worldwide.

In 2025, Hyperice and Nike launched the Hyperboot Nike x Hyperice compression boots. Designed to enhance warm-ups and aid post-workout recovery, the boots can also be worn as regular athletic footwear.

The compression boots incorporate air compression technology from Hyperice's Normatec line. Additionally, the Hyperboot Nike x Hyperice boots offer three levels of heat and compression, with individual controls for each boot—either manually or through the app.

Olympic athletes such as Sha'Carri Richardson and NFL star Jayden Daniels were involved in the development of the Hyperboot Nike x Hyperice.

The company's investors and sponsored athletes are NFL quarterback Patrick Mahomes, Norwegian footballer Erling Haaland, and India's cricket captain Virat Kohli.
