= 1947 Fort Lauderdale hurricane =

Category 4 Atlantic hurricane

Hurricane Four (George)
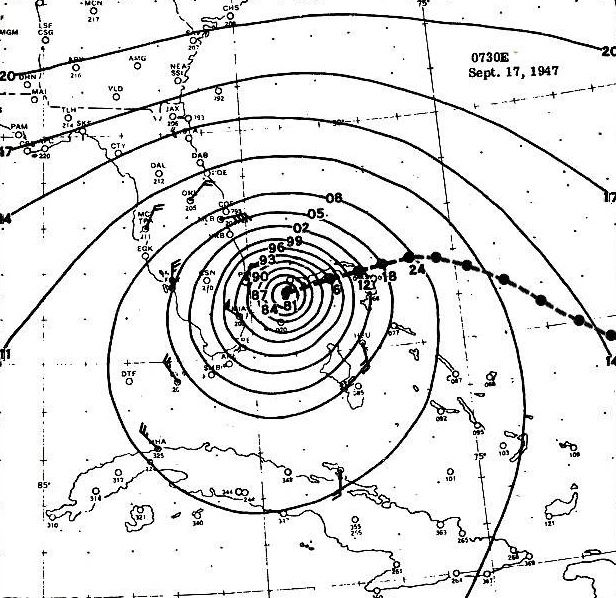
- Surface weather analysis of the hurricane nearing landfall in South Florida on September 17

Meteorological history
- Formed: September 4, 1947
- Extratropical: September 21, 1947
- Dissipated: September 21, 1947

Category 4 major hurricane
- 1-minute sustained (SSHWS/NWS)
- Highest winds: 145 mph (230 km/h)
- Lowest pressure: 938 mbar (hPa); 27.70 inHg

Overall effects
- Fatalities: 51 direct
- Damage: $84.2 million (1947 USD) ($1.21 billion in 2025 USD)
- Areas affected: The Bahamas; Florida; Louisiana; Mississippi
- IBTrACS /
- Part of the 1947 Atlantic hurricane season

The 1947 Fort Lauderdale hurricane (Air Weather Service designation: George (Note: Tropical cyclones in the Atlantic basin were not formally named prior to World War II. Storms such as this one were denoted by their attributes, including coincidence with Catholic saints' feasts. Starting in 1947 the United States Weather Bureau office in Miami, working with the military, informally applied the Joint Army/Navy Phonetic Alphabet to Atlantic tropical cyclones; the first storm to be so identified in public advisories was Hurricane Fox in 1950, when the names also first appear in Atlantic HURDAT. The 1947 storm has also been colloquially called the Pompano Beach (or simply Pompano), Broward, or Southeast Florida storm, as well as the New Orleans hurricane.)) was a long-lived and an intense tropical cyclone that affected the Bahamas, southernmost Florida, and the Gulf Coast of the United States in September 1947. The fourth Atlantic tropical cyclone of the year, it formed in the eastern Atlantic Ocean on September 4, becoming a hurricane, the third of the 1947 Atlantic hurricane season, less than a day later. After moving south by west for the next four days, it turned to the northwest and rapidly attained strength beginning on September 9. It reached a peak intensity of 145 mph (233 km/h) on September 15 while approaching the Bahamas. In spite of contemporaneous forecasts that predicted a strike farther north, the storm then turned to the west and poised to strike South Florida, crossing first the northern Bahamas at peak intensity. In the Bahamas, the storm produced a large storm surge and heavy damage, but with no reported fatalities.

A day later, the storm struck South Florida as a Category 4 hurricane, its eye becoming the first and only of a major hurricane to strike Fort Lauderdale. In Florida, advance warnings and stringent building codes were credited with minimizing structural damage and reducing loss of life to 17 people, but nevertheless widespread flooding and coastal damage resulted from heavy rainfall and high tides. Many vegetable plantings, citrus groves, and cattle were submerged or drowned as the storm exacerbated already high water levels and briefly threatened to breach the dikes surrounding Lake Okeechobee. However, the dikes held firm, and evacuations were otherwise credited with minimizing the potential death toll. On the west coast of the state, the storm caused further flooding, extensive damage south of the Tampa Bay Area, and the loss of a ship at sea.

On September 18, the hurricane entered the Gulf of Mexico and threatened the Florida Panhandle, but later its track moved farther west than expected, ultimately leading to a landfall southeast of New Orleans, Louisiana. Upon making landfall, the storm killed 34 people on the Gulf Coast of the United States and produced a storm tide as high as 15.2 ft (4.6 m), flooding millions of square miles and destroying thousands of homes. The storm was the first major hurricane to test Greater New Orleans since 1915, and the widespread flooding that resulted spurred flood-protection legislation and an enlarged levee system to safeguard the flood-prone area. In all, the powerful storm killed 51 people and caused $110 million (1947 US$) in damage. (Note: All damage totals are in 1947 United States dollars unless otherwise noted.)

== Meteorological history ==
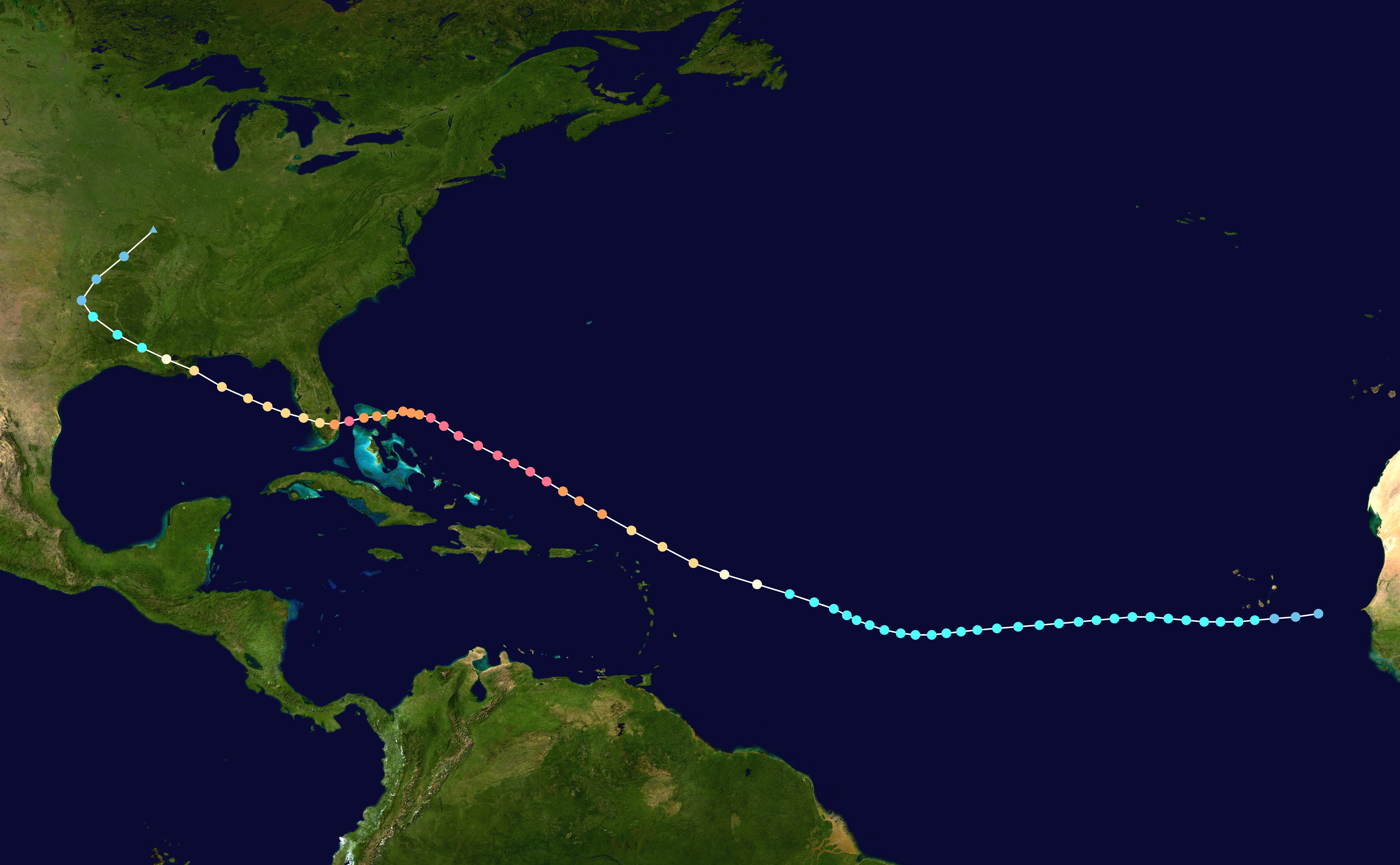
Map plotting the storm's track and intensity, according to the Saffir–Simpson scale Map key Saffir–Simpson scale Tropical depression (≤38 mph, ≤62 km/h) Tropical storm (39–73 mph, 63–118 km/h) Category 1 (74–95 mph, 119–153 km/h) Category 2 (96–110 mph, 154–177 km/h) Category 3 (111–129 mph, 178–208 km/h) Category 4 (130–156 mph, 209–251 km/h) Category 5 (≥157 mph, ≥252 km/h) Unknown Storm type Tropical cyclone Subtropical cyclone Extratropical cyclone, remnant low, tropical disturbance, or monsoon depression

On September 2, 1947, an observer for Pan American Airways at Dakar, French West Africa, noted a tropical wave. Within a few days it moved offshore, dropping 85.4 mm (3.36 in) of rain there. The wave was also discernible as a trough aloft, in the Intertropical Convergence Zone, and was seen near Cape Verde on September 5. At 12:00 UTC on September 4, the Atlantic hurricane database—HURDAT—initiated a tropical depression midway between Cap-Vert and the archipelago. Before 2014, HURDAT began it as a tropical storm and made it a hurricane within 18 hours of formation, raising its winds from 50 mph (85 km/h) to 75 mph (120 km/h); however, reanalysis found that it took more than a week to become a hurricane. For nearly six days the cyclone—at a brisk 17 mph (27 km/h)—headed south of due west, crossing half the tropical Atlantic, during which observers lost track of it after the second day, due to sparse in-situ data. Late on September 10, the ship Arakaka radioed the next definite report of its position, near 15°N 49°W. At 15:00 UTC the next day, reconnaissance was first sent to sample the storm, finding it of moderate intensity. At this point the cyclone began turning north of due west. Within a day it underwent rapid intensification, its winds increasing from 60 mph (95 km/h) to 100 mph (155 km/h), and a new flight reported a pressure of 977 mb (28.9 inHg), indicating a 24-hour drop of 22 mb (0.65 inHg). (Note: The same flight estimated winds of 144 mph (232 km/h). Note, however, that reconnaissance-derived estimates of wind speed are considered unreliable prior to the mid-1970s, if not more than a decade later.) Now equal to a Category 2 storm, the cyclone trekked west-northwest, a heading it kept for more than three days while being closely surveilled by aircraft. Just after, it attained winds of 115 mph (160 km/h)—major hurricane status—and for the first time aircraft noted concentric eyewalls in an Atlantic hurricane. The storm became a Category 4 hurricane on September 14. Late that day a flight found a pressure of 938 mb (27.7 inHg) in the storm's eye, a record low for a mission to date in the Atlantic, implying maximum sustained winds of 141 mph (227 km/h). Due to a 7-mile-wide (11 km) eye—smaller than average for its location—reanalysis assigned winds of 145 mph (230 km/h), equal to mid-range Category 4 status. Within a day the storm weakened and slowed considerably, nearing a "standstill" late on September 15 off the northernmost Bahamas, possibly due to a strong ridge.

Quasi-stationary, the storm lumbered west early on September 16, while sited 250 miles (405 km) east of Palm Beach, Florida. Its trajectory then shifted south of due west, nearing the Abaco Islands. At 19:00 UTC the cyclone made its first landfall, on Great Guana Cay, with winds of 120 mph (195 km/h). A weather station on a hilltop to its south—at Hope Town, Elbow Cay—recorded 160 mph (260 km/h), its highest winds on record, feeling the storm's radius of maximum wind. Shortly afterward it logged 60 mph (97 km/h) near the edge of the eye, along with a pressure of 960 mb (28 inHg) at the same time, suggesting a central pressure of 954 mb (28.2 inHg). (Note: According to one report, however, the pressure coincided with the station's strongest winds.) Both the pressure and the station's elevation justified Category 3 winds, a demotion from the storm's former Category 5 rank in HURDAT. Early on September 16 the storm, now very large—and accordingly described as a "monster" by media—turned west-southwest, brushed Grand Bahama, and began to regain force, closing in on peninsular Florida. By the time it reached the state's east coast, its twin eyewalls had formed a large eye, confirming its completion of an inner-core replacement.

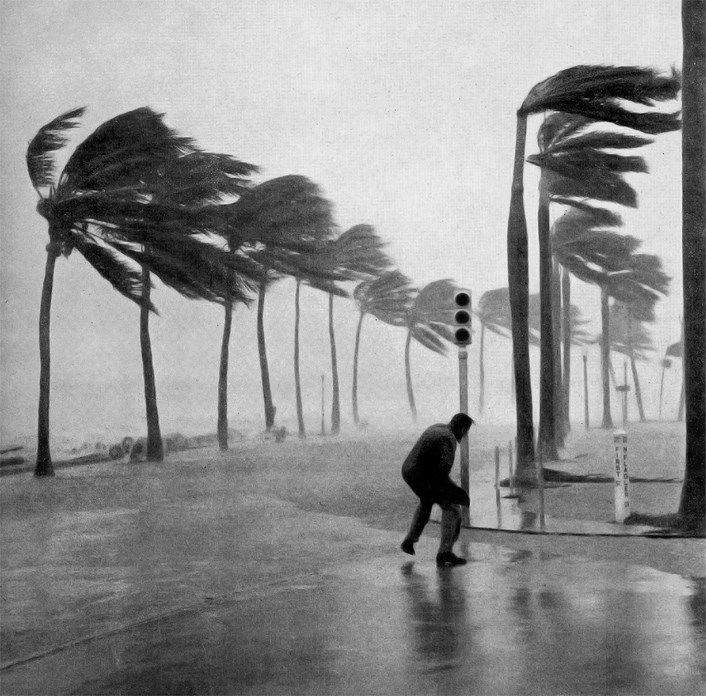
A man battles strong winds during the hurricane at South Flagler Drive in West Palm Beach

At 16:30 UTC on September 17, the cyclone struck South Florida near Fort Lauderdale with maximum sustained winds of 130 mph (215 km/h), equal to low-end Category 4 status. (Note: Original HURDAT showed landfall farther north, near Boca Raton, with winds of 155 mph (250 km/h), the latter derivative of the Hillsboro observation, which was erroneously taken to be a sustained wind.) At Hillsboro Inlet Light an anemometer, 43 m (141 ft) above sea level, measured a gust of 155 mph (249 km/h)—the strongest to be verified in a Florida hurricane before Andrew in 1992—and a brief lull, the latter during the eye passage; the former hinted at sustained winds of 131–138 mph (211–228 km/h) near standard height. (Note: The Saffir–Simpson scale uses an elevation of 10 m (33 ft) above mean sea level.) A barometer there sampled a low of 27.97 inHg (947 mb), and another at Cap's Place noted 945 mb (27.9 inHg), while readings farther south, nearer the center of the eye, varied from 951 to 956 mb (28.1 to 28.2 inHg); as Fort Lauderdale saw a longer calm than Hillsboro, the lowest pressures—reckoned to be near 943 mb (27.8 inHg) (Note: Before 2014 the lowest central value in Florida was officially listed as 940 mb (28 inHg).)—occurred by the eye's edge, implying eyewall mesovortices. The storm's radius of maximum wind was 15 miles (30 km)—near the mean for its intensity and location—but its size was huge and movement slow: hurricane-force winds extended outward 120 miles (195 km) and the storm crept inland at less than 10 mph (15 km/h). Winds over 100 mph (160 km/h) swept more than 70 miles (110 km) of coast between a point "well north" of Palm Beach and northern Miami. The storm's top winds were between Lake Worth and Fort Lauderdale, lashing lesser-populated areas such as Pompano, Deerfield, Boca Raton, Delray Beach, Coconut Creek, Coral Springs, and Margate. Winds topped 50 mph (80 km/h) over most of Florida below Brevard County, a radius of 150 miles (240 km). Meteorologist Grady Norton dubbed the storm a "Great Hurricane", one of only 10 such Florida storms on record (from 1880–1948), signifying overall intensity and impact; 13 years later his understudy Gordon Dunn deemed it "Extreme". (Note: A "Great Hurricane" contained winds over 125 mph (200 km/h) and spread hurricane-force winds over 100 miles (160 km) or more, while also generating high tides, low pressures, extensive damage, and casualties. An "Extreme" hurricane featured winds of at least 136 mph (219 km/h)—roughly equivalent to Category 4 on the Saffir–Simpson scale—and a barometric pressure of no more than 28.00 inHg (948 mb). The 1947 hurricane was the sole "Great Hurricane" in the late 1940s.)

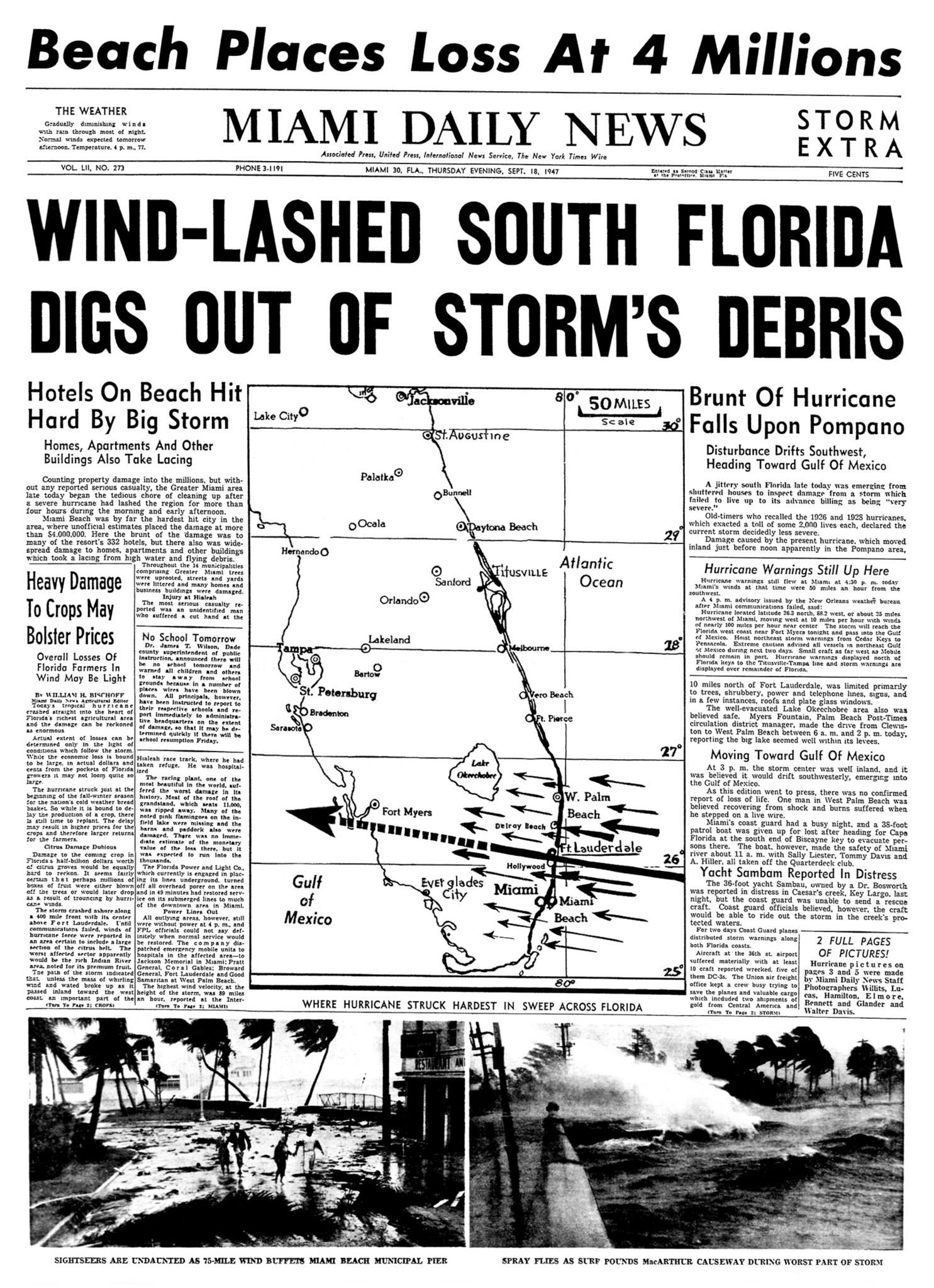
Front page of The Miami Daily News on September 18, regarding the hurricane's impact

Upon landfall, the sprawling storm headed west over the marshy Everglades and the Big Cypress region; while slowly weakening, it lightly damaged rural Collier and Broward counties. Just north of Naples, which received the southern side of the eye, the storm entered the Gulf of Mexico around 03:00 UTC on September 18, bearing winds of 100 mph (155 km/h). Moving offshore, it skirted Sanibel and Captiva islands, the latter of which recorded a pressure of 969.5 mb (28.63 inHg). Once over water, the hurricane turned more northwesterly and began to restrengthen, its forward pace rising to 18 mph (29 km/h). Around 14:00 UTC on September 19, the hurricane traversed the Chandeleur Islands and hit St. Bernard Parish, Louisiana, as a high-end Category 2 hurricane with sustained winds of 110 mph (175 km/h). (Note: Saffir–Simpson rankings were first given United States storms in 1975. Before reanalysis the 1947 storm was ranked Category 3 in both Louisiana and Mississippi, on the basis of pressure; however, since the late 1980s storms have been rated by wind alone.) Its 25-mile-wide (40 km) eye passed over Saint Bernard, Belle Chasse, and downtown New Orleans; several barometers read 967 to 974 mb (28.6 to 28.8 inHg), supporting a central value of 966 mb (28.5 inHg), as Belle Chasse Naval Air Station and the U.S. Weather Bureau office in New Orleans intercepted the calm center. After passing inland, the vortex hit the Louisiana state capital Baton Rouge with sustained winds of 96 mph (154 km/h), but degenerated rapidly thereafter: within 10 hours of landfall it lost hurricane status. Over Ark-La-Tex the tropical storm weakened further, becoming a tropical depression in North Texas late on September 20. Past the Red River its track bent northeast, and by 12:00 UTC the next day the system became extratropical, at which time it also dissipated.

== Preparations ==
On the evening of September 15, the U.S. Weather Bureau foresaw a north turn, suggestive of landfall between Jacksonville, Florida, and Savannah, Georgia. As a precautionary measure, small watercraft between Jupiter, Florida, and Cape Hatteras, North Carolina, were advised to remain in port. Early on September 16, the forecast was revised, and hurricane warnings were issued for eastern Florida from Titusville to Fort Lauderdale, later to be expanded to Miami. These were eventually issued for the west coast of the state south of Tampa, along with storm warnings in the Florida Keys. At least 5,000 people sheltered in a courthouse at Miami. As the hurricane approached Northern commercial flights were grounded, and 1,500 National Guard troops were readied to be mobilized if needed by Florida Governor Millard Caldwell. 4,700 persons in Broward County moved into Red Cross shelters, while up to 15,000 people evacuated the flood-prone Lake Okeechobee region. In all, more than 40,000 people statewide moved into Red Cross shelters. Military aircraft were flown to safer locations, in some cases four or days more in advance. Hotels in the at-risk area filled quickly due to fears of a disaster like the 1928 Okeechobee hurricane; at Melbourne and Cocoa no vacant hotels were left for evacuees. During the storm, the MacArthur, North Bay (now Kennedy), and Venetian Causeways in Miami were closed to traffic. At Lake Worth alone, 1,800 people sheltered in nine official shelters during the storm. As the hurricane reached the Gulf of Mexico, forecasters thought it would hit between Apalachicola and Pensacola, Florida, but by 04:15 UTC on September 19, the Weather Bureau office in New Orleans posted hurricane warnings from St. Marks, Florida, to Morgan City, Louisiana. As the storm neared Louisiana, Emile Verret, the acting governor of Baton Rouge, closed the state capital and sent public officials home. In New Orleans, local National Guard units were mobilized.

== Impact ==
Impacts by region
Region	Deaths	Injuries	Locale	Deaths	Injuries	Damages	Source
Caribbean and Bahamas	0	?	Bahamas	0	—N/a	—N/a	
United States	51	935	Florida	17	186	$31,800,000	
United States	51	935	Louisiana	12	95	$24,000,000	
United States	51	935	Mississippi	22	654	$28,438,000	
Total				51	935	$84,238,000	

=== The Bahamas ===
As the storm passed nearby, Green Turtle Cay was flooded by 2 ft (0.61 m) of water and the local weather station abandoned. Heavy seas flooded Hope Town during the storm. On the Abaco Islands the storm destroyed all crops, leading to food shortages. On Abaco Island winds hurled most of the coconuts off the palms, and seawater washed over vegetation, causing the latter to wither. No casualties occurred on the island, though settlements noted substantial damage. Strong winds badly damaged or destroyed the majority of docks and homes on the western end of Grand Bahama. At West End, then Settlement Point, a storm surge of 12 ft (3.7 m) destroyed half the community. Out of roughly 300 families there, the storm left 111 homeless. It leveled or overturned 56 homes and badly damaged 55 more. A weather station during the storm measured winds of 125 mph (201 km/h) at 07:00 UTC on September 17. Fierce winds downed a 40-foot-tall (12 m) tower and extensively damaged the island's primary fishing cannery, the Grand Bahama Packing Company; at the latter they unroofed the main building and collapsed a warehouse. (Note: The company belonged to Swedish industrialist Axel Wenner-Gren.) Damages were severer on Grand Bahama than on either Bimini or the Abaco Islands. On September 19 the United States Coast Guard dispatched the cutter Macoma to supply Grand Bahama with food and medical necessities. Aircraft also dropped food onto the island. Despite its intensity, the storm was not blamed for any deaths in the Lucayan Archipelago, and only slight injuries were reported.

=== Florida ===
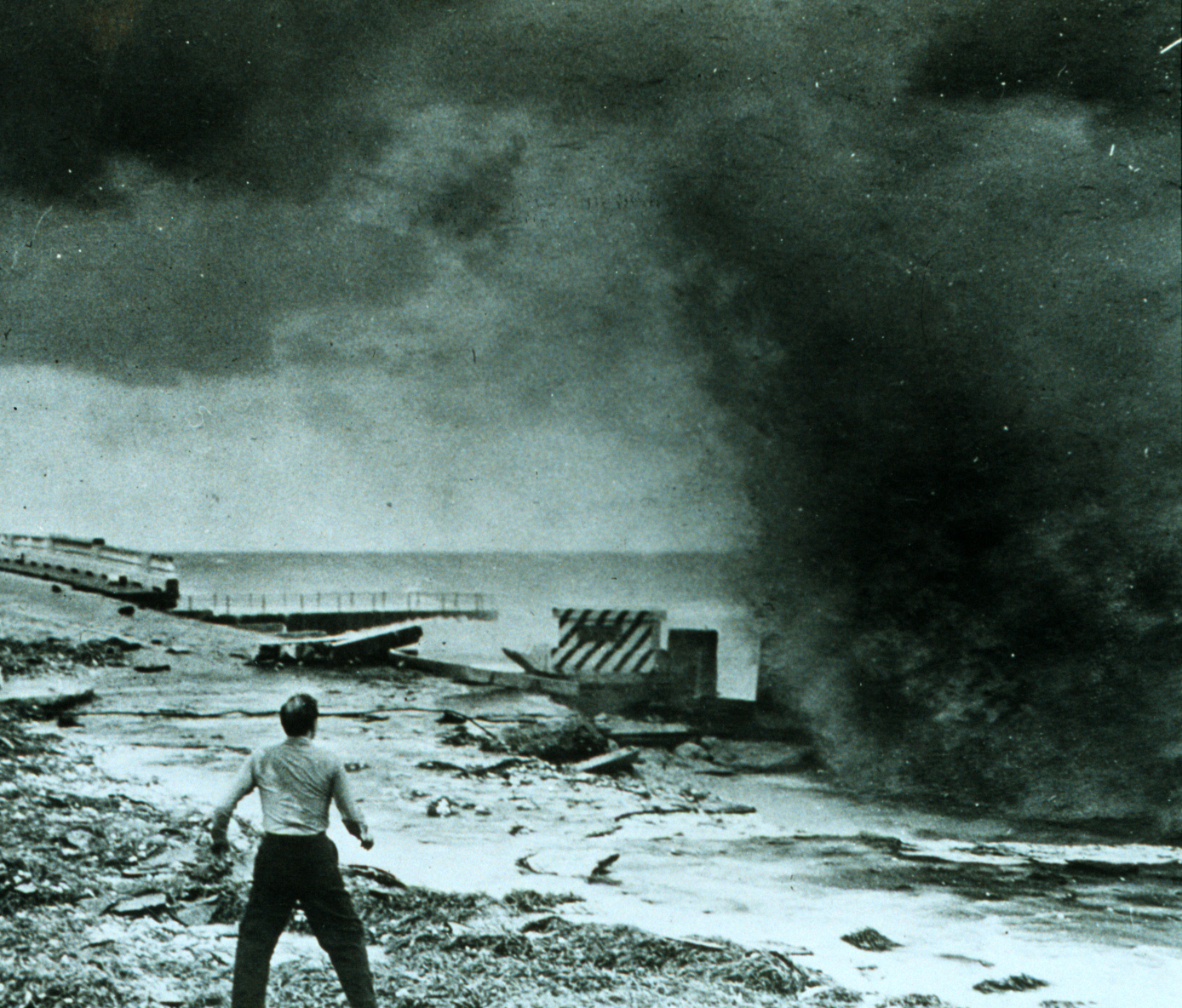
Man dwarfed by heavy surf near Miami

Statewide the storm destroyed 205 homes and severely damaged 10,543. Broadly comparable to the great 1926 and 1928 hurricanes, it killed far fewer people—only 17—than its size and intensity suggested, largely due to improvements in warnings, preparations, and building codes since the 1920s. As a result, its winds lightly damaged structures, destroying just 37 homes, mainly small, in Broward County, blowing hundreds more off their foundations, and unroofing lightweight structures in the Palm Beaches, while doing less damage to new buildings. Rainfall and surf did most damage. Gusts of 127 to 150 mph (204 to 241 km/h) in the Fort Lauderdale–Hollywood area tore off roofs and broke utility poles "like toothpicks". At Hillsboro Beach homes suffered roof and window damage but survived. At West Palm Beach, 40% of the initial $1 1/2 million in losses were to roofs. Gusts there reached 140 mph (230 km/h), snapping many trees.

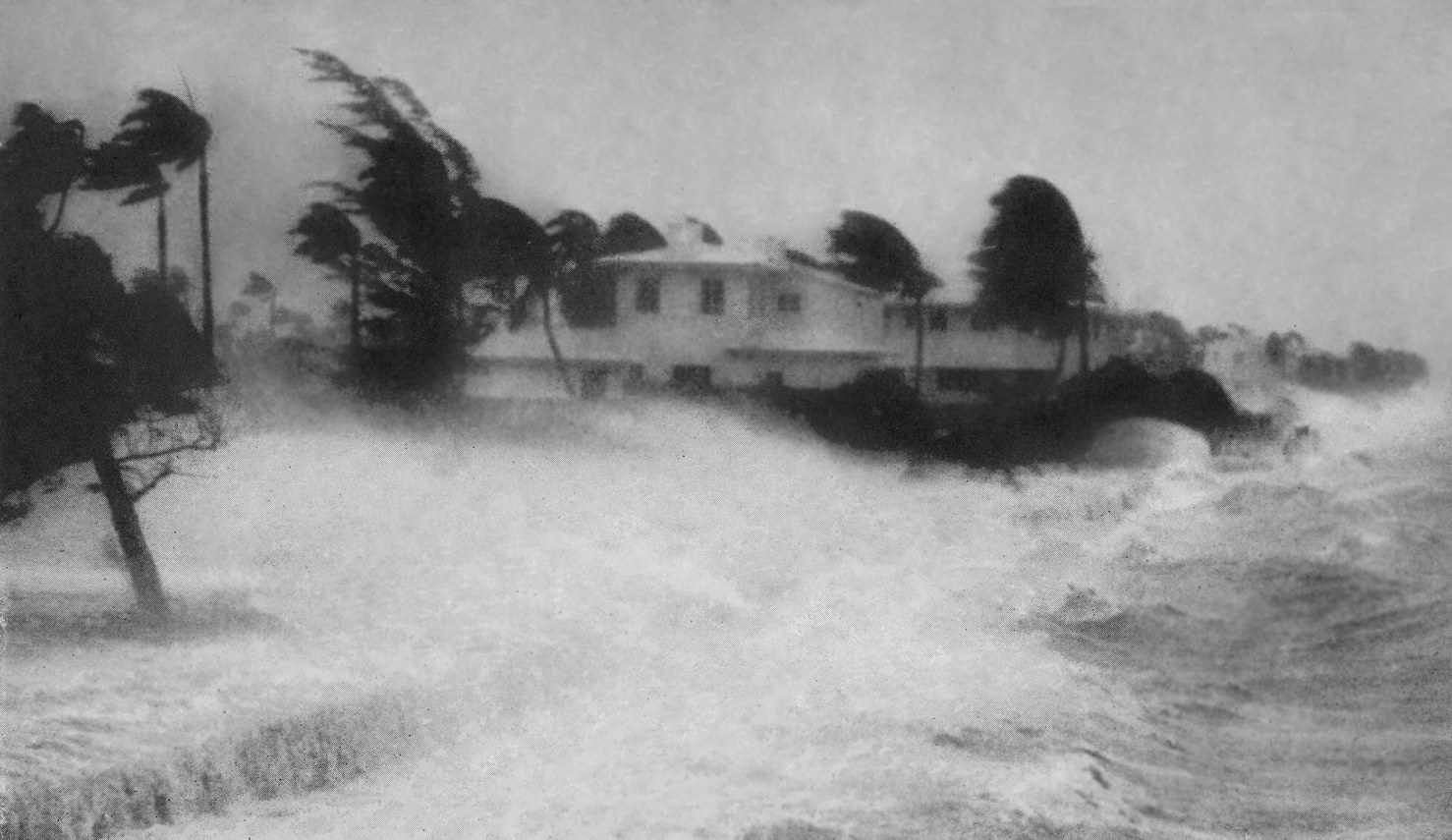
Storm surge battering a seawall in the west side of North Bay Village in Miami during the hurricane

The storm ravaged the Boca Raton Army Air Field, doing $4 1/2 million in losses there and hastening its closure; on base the hurricane mostly destroyed makeshift structures, including 150 barracks, supply houses, warehouses, the post stockade, the fire station, and the theater and mess buildings. At Hialeah, the 11,000-seat race track was mostly unroofed, its barns and paddocks damaged and many of its flamingos missing. Gusts of 110 mph (180 km/h) flipped and wrecked aircraft at Miami International Airport, while destroying hangars. Across Miami the winds felled power lines, signage, awnings, and trees.

A large storm tide inundated the beaches, peaking at 11 ft (3.4 m) at Hillsboro Inlet; similar levels occurred elsewhere from Fort Lauderdale to Palm Beach, eroding long swaths of State Highway A1A. Washouts also occurred from Sunny Isles Beach to Baker's Haulover Inlet. Near Lake Worth the ocean eliminated a 5-mile-long (8.0 km) segment of roadway, and washed out a 1-mile (1.6 km) section at Delray Beach. High tides reconfigured the coast, opening new channels and old inlets, and "whitecaps broke" 1 mi (1.6 km) inland on Las Olas Boulevard. The waves unmoored a few freighters at Port Everglades. A 6 1/2-foot-high (2.0 m) storm tide hit Bahia Mar Yacht Club, near the port. Large waves battered apartments, homes, and many of the 334 resorts on Miami Beach, causing severe flooding. A 3-to-4-foot-deep (0.91 to 1.22 m) layer of sand covered many grounds, and nearby neighborhoods on the Venetian Islands, like Belle Isle, were flooded to a depth of several feet. At Pompano floods lingered five days after the storm, covering the municipal beach and isolating the Hillsboro Inlet bridge. The sea also left sand drifts at Dania Beach, and swept away six homes at Deerfield. Tides reached 5.8 ft (1.8 m) at Fort Pierce.

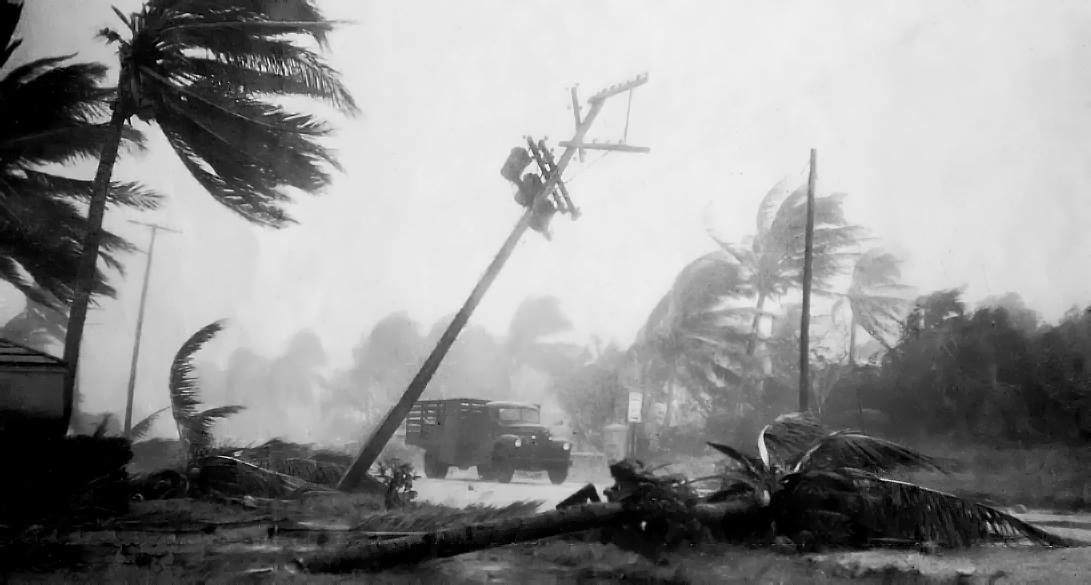
Downed palms and utility poles in South Florida

As it crossed South Florida, the storm dropped prolific rains over a broad area, peaking at 10.12 in (257 mm) at St. Lucie Lock, and so worsened a rainier-than-average wet season. (Note: Since March heavy rains had deluged the region; by July a "flood emergency" prevailed. Before the storm the area was waterlogged.) In Miami, floods swamped 200 mi (320 km) of city streets, and in Miami Springs over half the homes. Homestead "resembled Venice". Davie, having lost 35,000 citrus trees to floodwaters in past months, incurred devastating losses to groves and vegetable beds. In Fort Lauderdale the New River overran its banks, submerging downtown streets. The storm ruined vegetable beds in Broward County, delaying cultivation. It yielded 6 to 8 in (150 to 200 mm) of rain over the Everglades, flooding farms and drowning cattle. On Lake Okeechobee, the cyclone rivaled the 1928 hurricane, imperiling—but not overtopping—the Herbert Hoover Dike. Tides reached 21.6 ft (6.6 m) at Clewiston and 20.9 ft (6.4 m) at Moore Haven. Near the north shore, tides crested at 13 ft (4.0 m). A 150-foot-long (46 m) section of dike collapsed, stranding 700 cattle and flooding 1,800 acres (730 ha) of cropland. On Conners Highway floodwaters and debris combined to obstruct motorists; the former seeped over at 30 spots and overwhelmed a 3,000-foot-long (910 m) stretch.

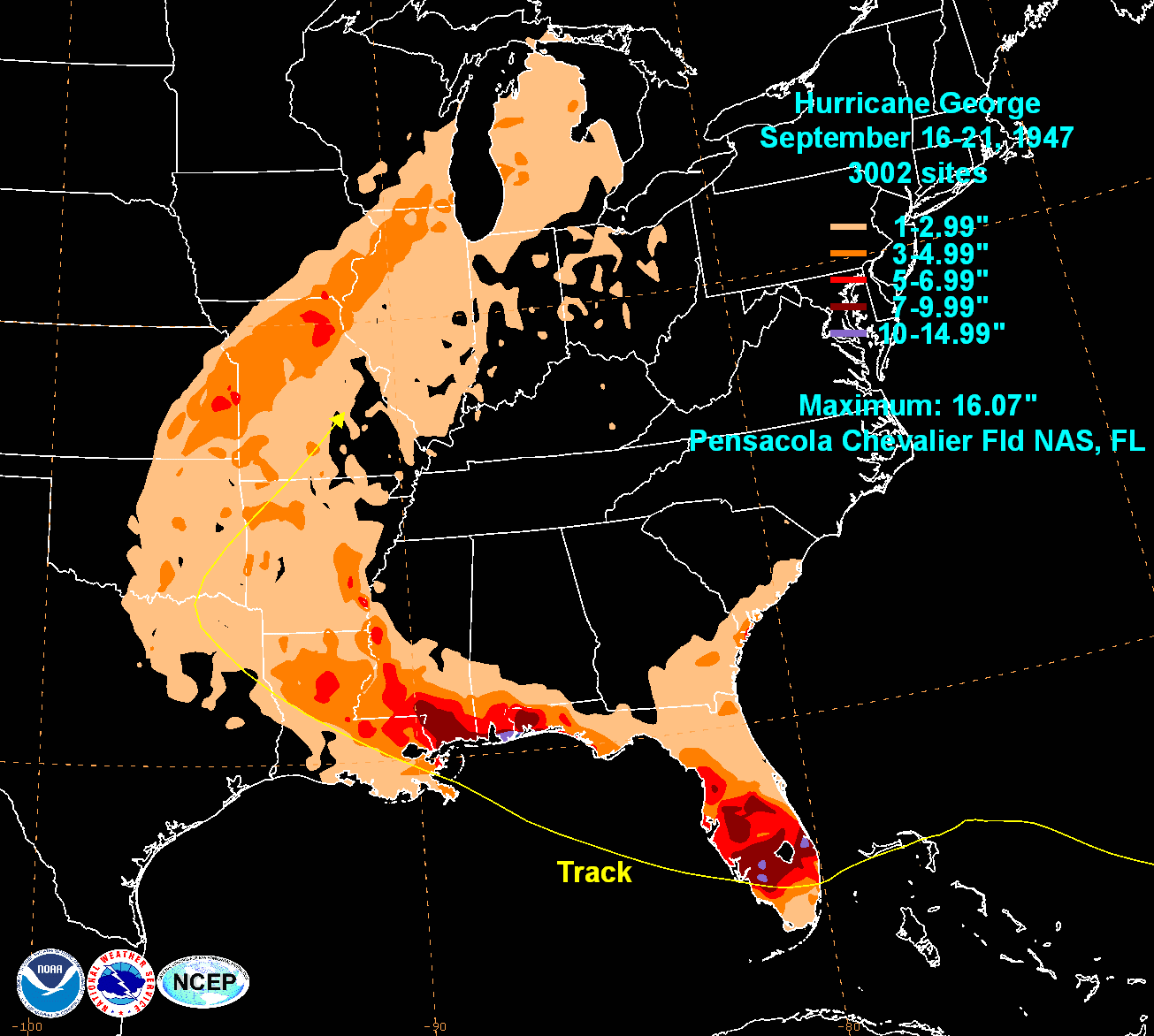
Map of the total rainfall from the hurricane across the United States

On the state's west coast, sustained winds of 105 mph (169 km/h) buffeted Naples, which likely missed the worst conditions. "Heavy" impacts affected the Fort Myers–Punta Gorda area, and 3 ft (0.91 m) of water covered the Sanibel Island Light grounds. Tides at Everglades City peaked at 5 1/2 ft (1.7 m), forcing denizens into attics and flooding local streets. However, winds blew offshore over Tampa Bay, resulting in below-normal tides and lesser damages. In Pinellas County winds damaged boats and ripped off roof shingles. In St. Petersburg the storm and a walk-out strike coincided, disrupting trolley service for 15 hours. In Fort Myers, hundreds of trees were prostrated and the city left powerless. During the storm, two vessels, with a total combined crew of nine people, went missing; as of September 18, contact had been established with the former and the crew declared safe, but the remaining vessel, with a crew of two, had not been accounted for. Additionally, six Cuban schooners carrying 150 crew members in all sheltered off Anclote Key late on September 17 and rode out the storm. However, another Cuban vessel, the Antonio Cerdedo, foundered and sank off Fort Myers with a loss of seven of its crew members. On September 19, a tornado generated by the storm struck Apalachicola, cutting a 3-mile (4.8 km) path, killing two people, and injuring 100 others. The tornado damaged or destroyed 58 homes over a 100-yard-wide (91 m) area, inflicting F3-level damage on the present Fujita scale.

=== Gulf Coast of the United States ===
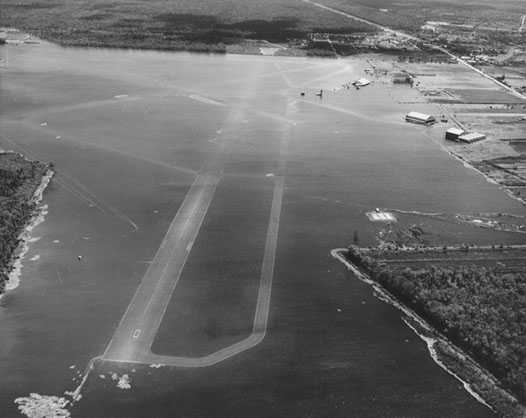
Moisant Airport flooded

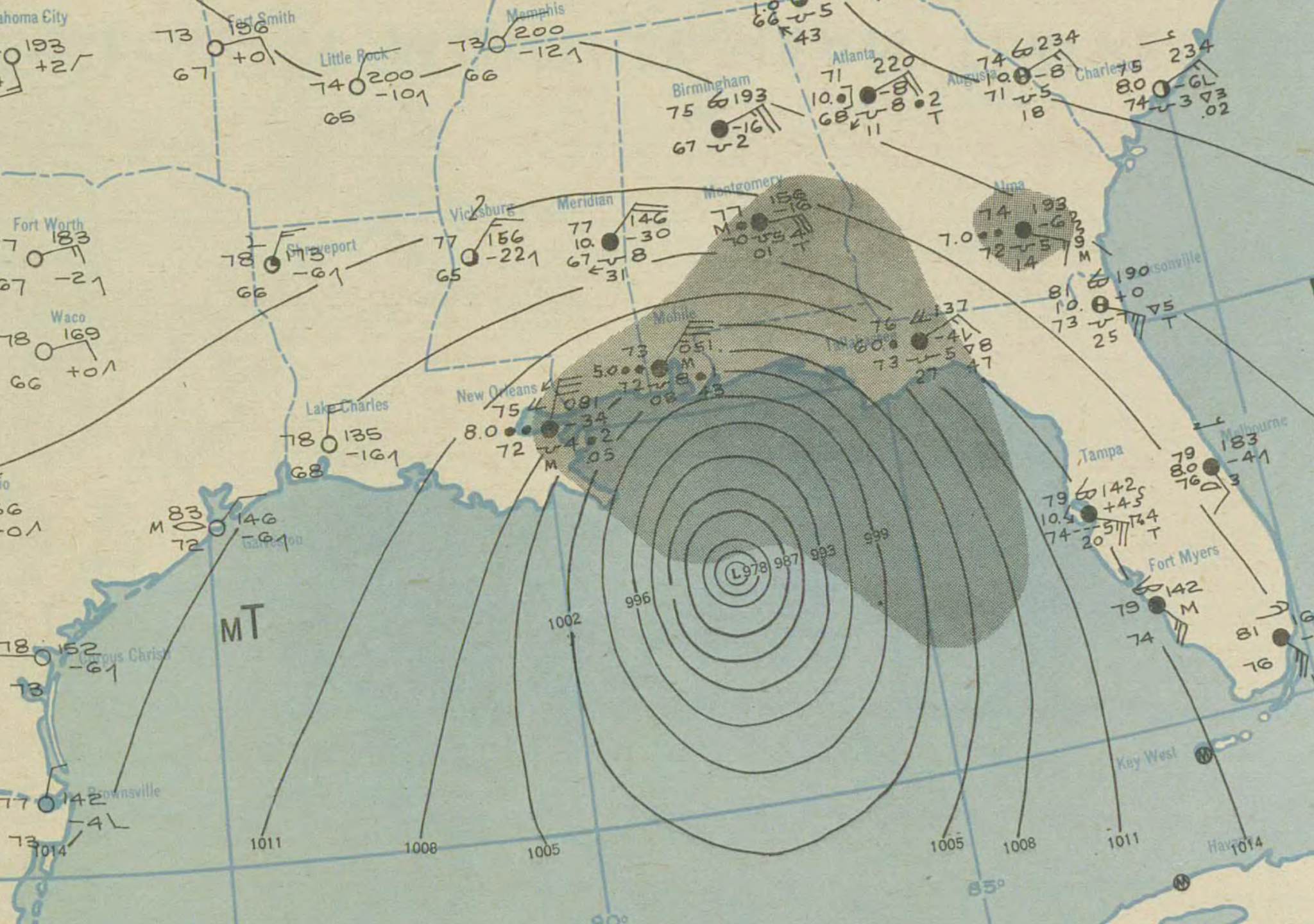
Weather map of the hurricane approaching southeast Louisiana on September 19

Wind instruments at Moisant Field were disabled after recording sustained winds of 90 mph (140 km/h). Due to northerly winds, water overtopped sections of the levees on Lake Pontchartrain, leaving some lakefront streets "waist deep," above the 3-foot (0.91 m) delimiter. Local communications failed during the storm, so the New Orleans Weather Bureau office handed responsibility to its counterpart in Fort Worth, Texas, which issued public advisories instead. The storm flooded a large part of Greater New Orleans: up to 2 ft (0.61 m) of water covered Moisant Field, forcing it to shut down, and up to 6 ft (1.8 m) in parts of Jefferson Parish. The storm surge in Louisiana peaked at 9.8–11.2 ft (3.0–3.4 m) at Shell Beach on Lake Borgne and at 11.5 ft (3.5 m) in Ostrica. (Note: The completion of the Mississippi River Gulf Outlet in 1968 led to erosion, so Shell Beach is submerged today.) In Orleans Parish the surge overtopped the 9-foot-tall (2.7 m) seawall—built by the Orleans Levee Board in the 1920s to stop a repeat of the 1915 hurricane there—and spread water over 9 mi^{2} (23 km^{2}) of the parish, as far from Lake Pontchartrain as Gentilly Ridge. Water covered large parts of Jefferson Parish for as long as two weeks.

Subsidence settled behind the levees, forming "topographic bowls". These contained up to 6 ft (1.8 m) of water, which was dredged and pumped back into Lake Pontchartrain. An 11-foot (3.4 m) storm surge also hit remote areas of St. Bernard and Plaquemines parishes. Tides of up to 15.2 ft (4.6 m) impacted the western half of the Mississippi coast, causing heavy damage in Bay St. Louis, Gulfport, and Biloxi. These recorded their highest tides on record until Hurricane Camille. Although the storm was not a major hurricane at landfall, it still did significant damage, in part owing to the hydrology of the region. 12 people were killed in Louisiana and 22 in Mississippi. In both states combined, the Red Cross reported that the storm destroyed 1,647 homes and damaged 25,000 others, mostly by water. In New Orleans, the storm produced an estimated $100 million worth of damage to the city.

== Aftermath ==
In Florida, a federal state of emergency was declared by then-U.S. President Harry S. Truman. The hurricane, a subsequent tropical storm, and an October hurricane generated one of the worst floods in South Florida's history, spurring the creation of the Central and Southern Florida Flood Control District, along with a plan for new flood-control levees and canals. In New Orleans, the United States Congress approved the Lake Pontchartrain and Vicinity Project to assist ongoing efforts to increase the height of the existing levee along the lakeshore; to bolster the existing seawall in Orleans Parish, an 8-foot-high (2.4 m) levee was erected along the lakeside in Jefferson Parish. New Orleans' Walnut Street Ferry was damaged and never replaced. If this same storm were to hit in 2006 it would probably do around $14.406 billion (2006 USD) in damages.

== See also ==
- List of Category 4 Atlantic hurricanes
- List of Florida hurricanes (1900–1949)
- List of storms named George
- Hurricane Betsy (1965) – Headed south of west for a while, affecting Florida and Louisiana
- Hurricane Andrew (1992) – A devastating Category 5 hurricane that took a similar path

== Sources ==
- Air Weather Service (July 1948). West, W. A. (ed.). Report on the Off-Season Operations of the Air Force Hurricane Office 1947–1948 (PDF) (Technical report). Air Weather Service Technical Report. Washington, D.C. 105-37, Report on the Off-Season Operations – via Defense Technical Information Center.
- Barnes, Jay (1998). Florida's Hurricane History (1st ed.). Chapel Hill, North Carolina: UNC Press. ISBN 0-8078-2443-7 – via Internet Archive.
- Blake, Eric; Rappaport, Edward N. & Landsea, Christopher (April 15, 2007) [2006]. The Deadliest, Costliest, and Most Intense United States Tropical Cyclones (1851 to 2006) (PDF) (Technical report). NOAA Technical Memorandum. Miami: National Hurricane Center. NWS TPC-5. Archived (PDF) from the original on February 16, 2008.
- Bush, David M.; Neal, William J.; Longo, Norma J.; et al. (2004). Pilkey, Orrin H.; Neal, William J. (eds.). Living with Florida's Atlantic Beaches: Coastal Hazards from Amelia Island to Key West. Living with the Shore. Durham, North Carolina: Duke University Press. ISBN 978-0-822-33289-3 – via Internet Archive.
- Churl, Donald W.; Johnson, John P. (1990). Boca Raton: A Pictorial History. The Downing Company Publishers. ISBN 978-0-89865-792-0 – via Internet Archive.
- Colten, Craig C. (2009). Perilous Place, Powerful Storms: Hurricane Protection in Coastal Louisiana. University Press of Mississippi. ISBN 9781604733457 – via Internet Archive.
- Doehring, Fred; Duedall, Iver W.; Williams, John M. (June 1994). Florida Hurricanes and Tropical Storms, 1871–1993: An Historical Survey (Technical report). Technical Paper. Gainesville, Florida: Florida Sea Grant. 71, Florida Hurricanes and Tropical Storms – via National Oceanic and Atmospheric Administration.
- Douglas, Marjory Stoneman (1976) [1958]. Hurricane. Covington, Georgia: Mockingbird Books. SBN 89176-015-6 – via Internet Archive.
- Dunn, Gordon; Miller, Banner I. (1960). Atlantic hurricanes. Louisiana State University Press. LCCN 60-10630 – via Internet Archive.
- Grazulis, Thomas P. (November 1990). Significant Tornadoes 1880–1989. Vol. 2. St. Johnsbury, Vermont: The Tornado Project of Environmental Films. ISBN 1-879362-02-3.
  - — (July 1993). Significant Tornadoes 1680–1991: A Chronology and Analysis of Events. St. Johnsbury, Vermont: The Tornado Project of Environmental Films. ISBN 978-1879362031.
- Harris, D. Lee (1963). Characteristics of the Hurricane Storm Surge (PDF) (Technical report). Weather Bureau Technical Papers. Washington, D.C.: United States Weather Bureau. 48, Characteristics of the Hurricane Storm Surge.
- Heath, Richard C.; Conover, Clyde S. (1981). Hydrologic almanac of Florida (PDF) (Report). United States Geological Survey. 81-1107. Archived from the original (PDF) on May 1, 2019.
- Ho, Francis P.; Su, James C.; Hanevich, Karen C.; et al. (April 1987). Hurricane climatology for the Atlantic and Gulf coasts of the United States (Technical report). NOAA Technical Memorandum. Silver Spring, Maryland: National Weather Service. NWS 38.
- International Best Track Archive for Climate Stewardship (IBTrACS) (September 2022). IBTrACS browser (hosted by UNC Asheville) (Report). National Centers for Environmental Information – via World Data Center for Meteorology.
- Jarrell, Jerry P.; Herbert, Paul J.; Mayfield, Max (August 1992). Hurricane experience levels of coastal county populations, Texas to Maine (Technical report). NOAA Technical Memorandum. Coral Gables, Florida: National Weather Service. NWS NHC-46.
- Johnson, Lamar (1974). Beyond the Fourth Generation. Gainesville: University Press of Florida. ISBN 978-0813003986 – via Internet Archive.
- Kleinberg, Eliot (2003). Black Cloud: The Deadly Hurricane of 1928. Carroll and Graf Publishing. ISBN 0-7867-1386-0 – via Internet Archive.
- Landsea, Christopher W.; Franklin, James L.; McAdie, Colin J.; et al. (November 2004). "A Reanalysis of Hurricane Andrew's Intensity" (PDF). Bulletin of the American Meteorological Society. 85 (11): 1699–1712. Bibcode:2004BAMS...85.1699L. doi:10.1175/BAMS-85-11-1699.
  - —; Glenn, David A.; Bredemeyer, William; et al. (2007). "A Reanalysis of the 1911–20 Atlantic Hurricane Database" (PDF). Journal of Climate. 21 (10). American Meteorological Society: 2138–2168. Bibcode:2008JCli...21.2138L. doi:10.1175/2007JCLI1119.1. Archived (PDF) from the original on May 14, 2016 – via Atlantic Oceanographic and Meteorological Laboratory.
  - —; Strahan-Sakoskie, Donna; Hagen, Andrew (July 2012). "A Reanalysis of the 1944–53 Atlantic Hurricane Seasons—The First Decade of Aircraft Reconnaissance" (PDF). Journal of Climate. 25 (13). Boston: American Meteorological Society: 4441–4460. Bibcode:2012JCli...25.4441H. doi:10.1175/JCLI-D-11-00419.1 – via Atlantic Oceanographic and Meteorological Laboratory.
- Ling, Sally J. (2012) [2005]. Small Town, Big Secrets: Inside the Boca Raton Army Air Field During World War II. History Press. ISBN 978-1475251944 – via Internet Archive.
- McIver, Stuart (1983). Fort Lauderdale and Broward County: An Illustrated History. Fort Lauderdale Historical Society. ISBN 978-0897810814.
- Norcross, Bryan (2007). Hurricane Almanac: The Essential Guide to Storms Past, Present, and Future (2nd ed.). St. Martin's Griffin. ISBN 978-0312371524 – via Internet Archive.
- Norton, Grady (September 1947). Written at Miami. Bennett, W. J. (ed.). "Reports of hurricanes, September 1947". Florida section. Climatological Data. 51 (9). Washington, D.C.: United States Weather Bureau: 53–4, 56.
  - — (October 15, 1947). "Forecaster's Report of Hurricanes of September, 1947" (PDF). Letter to Chief, U.S. Weather Bureau. pp. 1–6.
- Schoner, R. W.; Molansky, S. (July 1956). Rainfall associated with hurricanes (PDF) (Technical report). National Hurricane Research Project. Washington, D.C.: United States Weather Bureau. pp. 85, 216. 3 – via Weather Prediction Center.
- "Severe Local Storms for September 1947". Monthly Weather Review. 75 (11): 183–84. September 1947. Bibcode:1947MWRv...75..183.. doi:10.1175/1520-0493(1947)075<0183:SLSFS>2.0.CO;2.
- Simiu, Emil; Vickery, Peter; Kareem, Ahsan (July 2007). "Relation Between Saffir-Simpson Hurricane Scale Wind Speeds and Peak 3-s Gust Speeds Over Open Terrain". Journal of Structural Engineering. Technical Notes. 133 (7). Reston, Virginia: 1043–5. doi:10.1061/(ASCE)0733-9445(2007)133:7(1043).
- Sumner, H. C. (December 1947). "North Atlantic hurricanes and tropical disturbances of 1947". Monthly Weather Review. 75 (11): 251–55. Bibcode:1947MWRv...75..251S. doi:10.1175/1520-0493(1947)075<0251:NAHATD>2.0.CO;2.
- Tannehill, I. R. (1952) [1938]. Hurricanes: Their Nature and History (8th ed.). Princeton, New Jersey: Princeton University Press. OCLC 3024697 – via Internet Archive.
- Turpin, Roger J. B. (1982). "Analysis of the Tropical Cyclone Threat at Port Everglades". In Brand, Samson (ed.). Hurricane Havens Handbook for the North Atlantic Ocean (PDF) (Technical report). Hurricane Havens Handbook. Monterey, California: Naval Research Laboratory. pp. XIX-7–18. TR 82-03.
- U.S. Army Engineer District, Mobile Corps of Engineers (May 1970). Hurricane Camille: 14 – 22 August 1969 (PDF) (Report). Mobile District: United States Army Corps of Engineers. Archived from the original (PDF) on September 6, 2012.
- Will, Lawrence E. (1961). Okeechobee Hurricane and the Hoover Dike (1st ed.). St. Petersburg, Florida: Great Outdoors Publishing. OCLC 1309988 – via Internet Archive.
- Williams, John M.; Duedall, Iver W. (2002) [1997]. Florida Hurricanes and Tropical Storms, 1871–2001 (2nd ed.). Gainesville: University Press of Florida. ISBN 0-8130-2494-3 – via Internet Archive.
- Winsberg, Morton D. (1990). Florida Weather (1st ed.). Orlando, Florida: University of Central Florida Press. ISBN 0-8130-0989-8 – via Internet Archive.
  - — (2003) [1990]. Florida Weather (2nd ed.). Gainesville: University Press of Florida. ISBN 0-8130-2684-9.
