= Deerfield Beach Island =

Island in Broward County, Florida, United States

Coordinates: 26°18′02″N 80°04′42″W

Deerfield Beach Island, also colloquially known as DBI, is an island off the eastern mainland of Boca Raton and Deerfield Beach, Florida, United States.

The island is approximately 5.5 miles long, consisting of three municipalities and two counties. The island runs from Lake Boca and Boca Inlet on the north end through Deerfield Beach to the Hillsboro Inlet and lighthouse on the south end of the island. The north end of the island is part of Boca Raton in Palm Beach County with approximately 3000 residences, several recreational parks and two drawbridges. The middle of the Island is part of Deerfield Beach (in Broward County) with approx. 2000 residences, public beaches, Deerfield Beach International Fishing Pier, numerous restaurants/shops, and one drawbridge (Hillsboro Blvd.) leading to the mainland. The south end of Deerfield Beach Island is the town of Hillsboro Beach in Broward County with approx. 3000 residences, Hillsboro Mile, Hillsboro Inlet, Hillsboro Club, Hillsboro Lighthouse and some of the most expensive beach homes in the U.S.

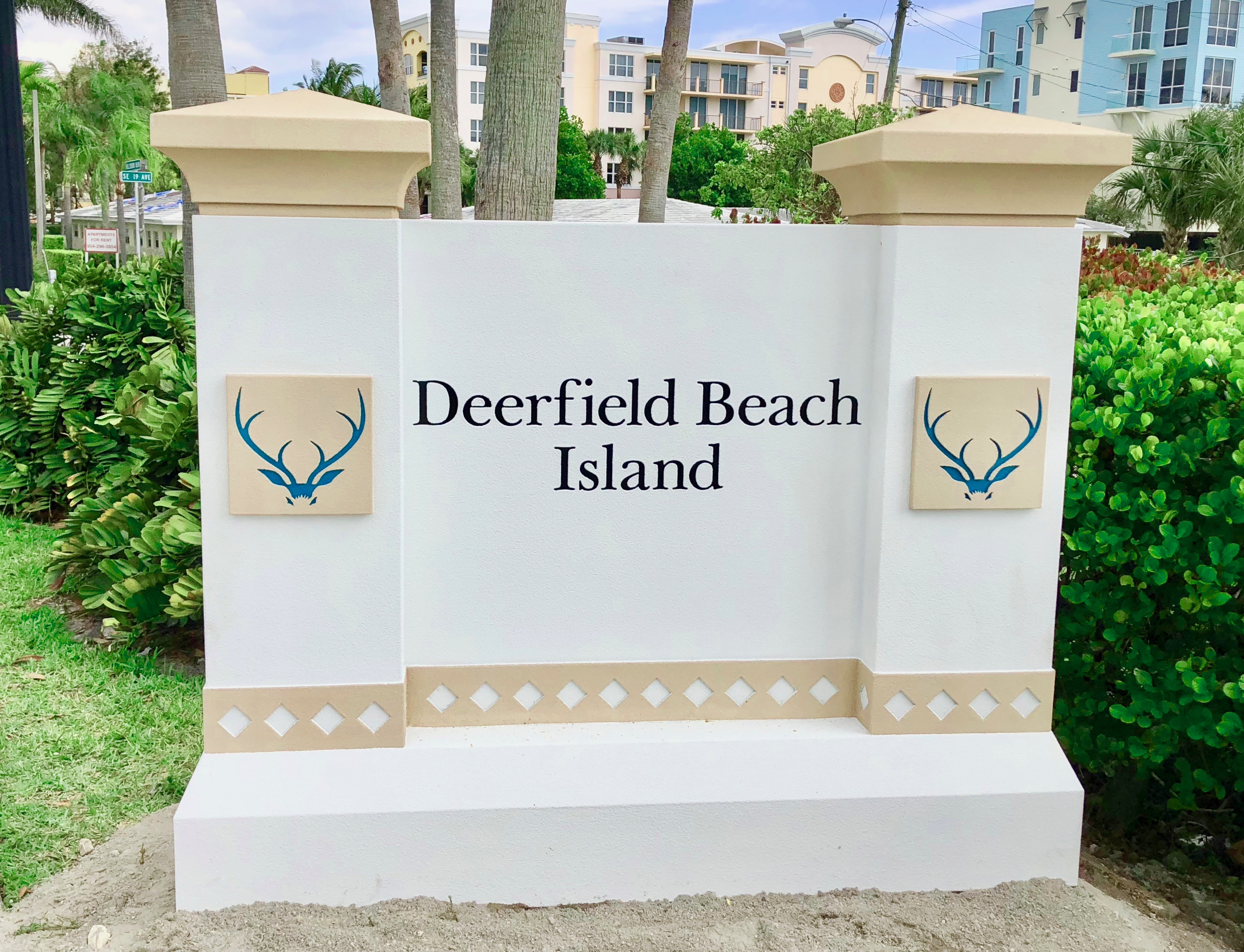
Monument/Sign erected by the City of Deerfield Beach and state funded Community Redevelopment Agency on April 30, 2018.

On 30 April 2018, the City of Deerfield Beach and the state-funded Community Redevelopment Agency erected a monument on the Southeast corner of the Hillsboro Bridge recognizing the section of the island that is exclusively Deerfield Beach and creating the "Deerfield Beach Island" District".
