= JW Bible College =

Coordinates: 26.2804°N 80.0960°W

- Motto: "Teaching with Excellence"
- Type: Bible College
- Established: 1998
- Affiliations: Assembly of God Bethlehem Ministry
- Location: Lighthouse Point, Florida, United States
- Website: www.jwbc.usfacil.com

JW Bible College (JW) is a Bible college in Lighthouse Point, Florida, United States. It is affiliated with the Assembly of God Bethlehem Ministry. The school was first founded in Lighthouse Point, Florida in 1998. The school primarily offers instruction in theology.
