= Assembly of God Bethlehem Ministry (Congregations) =

Assembly of God Bethlehem Ministry also has Churches in other parts of the United States and other countries in the world. Serving in different languages too. Here are all of the Congregations:

| Country (State/Province) | City | Description |
|---|---|---|
| Spain | Almería | |
| Spain | Barcelona | |
| Spain | Madrid | |
| Spain | Girona | |
| Spain | Figueres | |
| Switzerland | Bern | |
| Switzerland | Lausanne | |
| Switzerland | Geneva | |
| Switzerland | Winterthur | |
| Switzerland | Nyon | |
| Switzerland | Zurich | |
| Italy | Mantua | |
| Italy | Milan | |
| Italy | Turin | |
| Australia | Melbourne | |
| Australia | Rockhampton | |
| Australia | Toowoomba | |
| Australia | Brisbane | |
| United States | Boca Raton, Florida | |
| United States | Boston, Massachusetts | Spanish |
| United States | Boston, Massachusetts | |
| United States | Boynton Beach, Florida | Spanish |
| United States | Charlotte, North Carolina | Spanish |
| United States | Charlotte, North Carolina | |
| United States | Chicago, Illinois | |
| United States | Columbus, Ohio | |
| United States | Dallas, Texas | Spanish |
| United States | Fall River, Massachusetts | |
| United States | Fort Myers, Florida | |
| United States | Garden Grove, California | |
| United States | Glendale, California | |
| United States | Haleiwa, Hawaii | |
| United States | Hollywood, Florida | |
| United States | Hollywood, Florida | Spanish |
| United States | Hyannis, Massachusetts | |
| United States | Jacksonville, Florida | |
| United States | Lighthouse Point, Florida | Spanish |
| United States | Lighthouse Point, Florida | Headquarters |
| United States | Lighthouse Point, Florida | English |
| United States | Los Angeles, California | |
| United States | Naples, Florida | |
| United States | Naples, Florida | English |
| United States | Naples, Florida | Spanish |
| United States | Orlando, Florida | |
| United States | Palm Bay, Florida | |
| United States | Port St. Lucie, Florida | |
| United States | Richmond, Virginia | |
| United States | Sarasota, Florida | |
| United States | Sarasota, Florida | Spanish |
| United States | Vero Beach, Florida | |
| United States | Washington D.C. | |
| United States | Weymouth, Massachusetts | |
| Belgium | Brussels | |
| England | Stoke Newington | |
| England | London | |
| England | Bristol | |
| England | Newham | |
| England | Rugby | |
| France | Orléans | |
| France | Paris | |
| France | Chartres | |
| Germany | Cologne | |
| Germany | Essen | |
| Germany | Frankfurt | |
| Germany | Hamburg | |
| Germany | Munich | |
| Germany | Nuremberg | |
| El Salvador | Santa Ana | |
