= Cap's Place =

- U.S. National Register of Historic Places
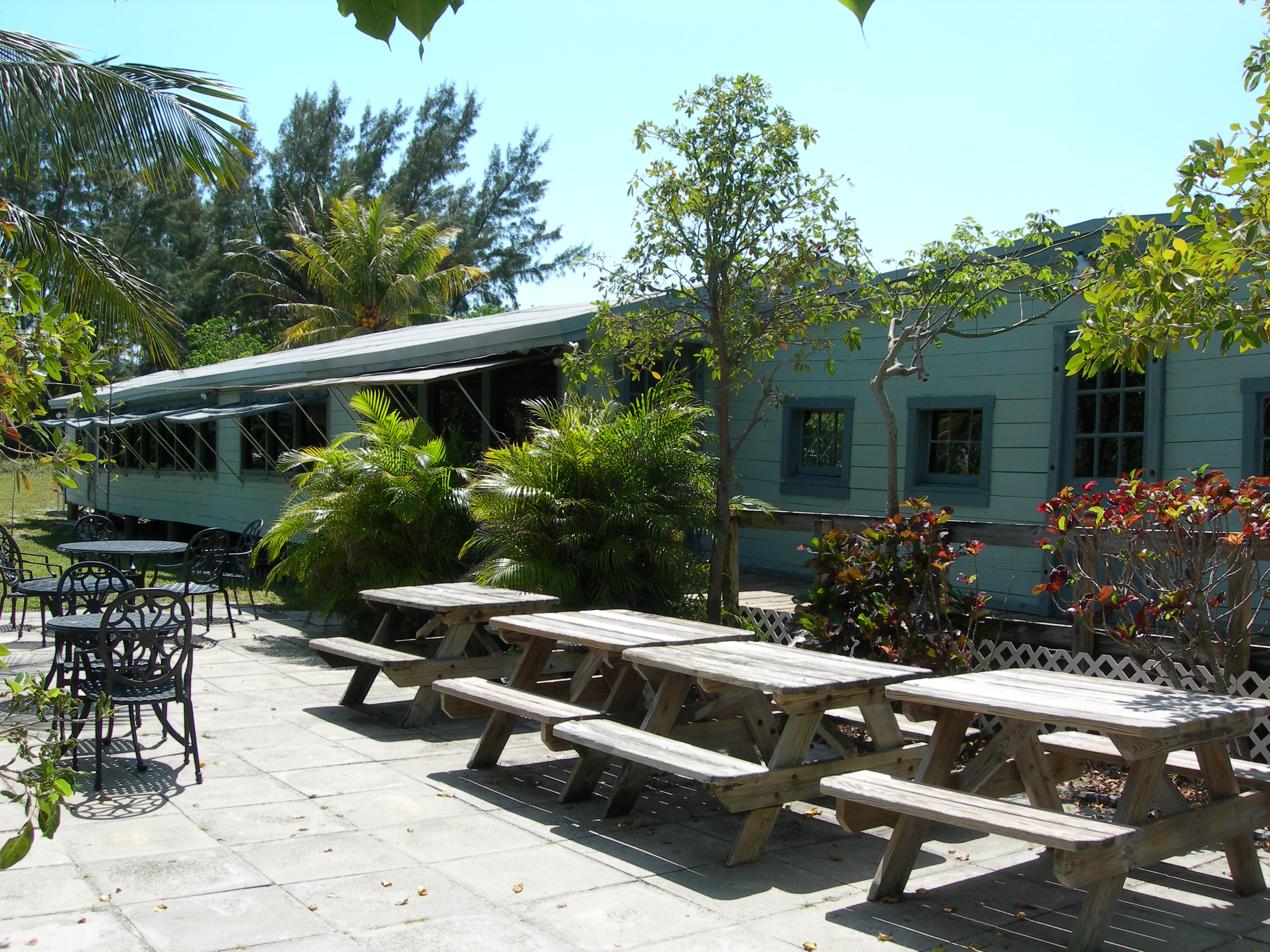
- Outside tables with Intracoastal Waterway view

- Location within Florida Location within the United States
- Location: 2980 Northeast 31st Avenue, Lighthouse Point, Florida
- Coordinates: 26°16′05.78″N 80°04′54.77″W
- Area: 1.5 acres (0.61 ha)
- Built: 1928
- Built by: Knight, Cap; Hasis, Al
- Architectural style: Vernacular frame
- NRHP reference No.: 90001227
- Added to NRHP: 10 August 1990

Cap's Place, originally named Club Unique, is a historic site in Lighthouse Point, Florida, United States. It opened in 1928 as a speakeasy (with associated rum-running), gambling den and restaurant. It is the oldest extant structure in the City of Lighthouse Point and the oldest commercial enterprise in the area. It has operated as a restaurant since opening and is the oldest restaurant in Broward County, Florida. On August 10, 1990, it was added to the U.S. National Register of Historic Places. It is located at 2980 Northeast 31st Avenue. There is no parking at the site (except for the handicapped); all patrons must take a free boat shuttle to the facility.

== Setting ==
Cap's Place is a collection of five wood-frame vernacular buildings, four of which are considered historic. It is located on a peninsula between Lake Placid and the Intracoastal Waterway, in a residential neighborhood in the City of Lighthouse Point, Broward County, Florida. The first building was erected in 1928 on a beached dredging barge. It has been described as having "no architecture, save Cap's own creative style, born of need and materials available in Florida in 1928." The site was expanded to its current L-shaped configuration in 1929. At the time of this construction the peninsula was very narrow and portions of the buildings extended over the water. In the 1960s the bay side of the peninsula was filled, raising the elevation of the land and extending the shoreline past some of the buildings that had been partially over water. The site is flanked by water to the east and west. A buffer of slash pine and Australian pine to the north and south retains much of the feel of the original setting. It was originally only accessible by water.

== Layout ==
The structures making up the establishment are a restaurant (original building with expansion), a bar, a fish house, a dock and walkways and a boat house (not considered historic due to alterations). All of the buildings were constructed with native materials, including Cuban mahogany, bamboo, pecky cypress, and Dade County pine. Some of the building material was purchased from the recently established Pompano Lumber Company. The restaurant was built in two stages; the initial portion was constructed on a beached c. 1924 dredging barge which raised the structure above ground level.

=== The restaurant ===
The barge was stripped to provide a base for a one-story wood-framed building with a gabled roof. The interior and exterior wall of this portion are constructed of thick horizontal pine planks. The windows and doors are symmetrically placed and original wood casings and surrounds remain. The main entrance is on the east side and is flanked by multiple pane windows with wood sashing. The south side is covered with plywood for protection from water damage but windows are visible from the interior. This portion forms the east–west portion of the extant L-shape.

The restaurant addition is a long rectangular building sitting on concrete block piers and has wood floors and a horizontal board exterior. Built of Dade County pine, this building has a low-pitched asphalt shingle roof. The main entrance is on the north side, with another entrance on the east side. While aluminium windows have been installed on east and west sides, the original window woodwork remains intact. This addition had red carpet and became known as the "Poinsettia Room" or the "Poinciana Room". It was joined to the original building by a foyer in 1954. The Poinsettia Room was the principal site of gambling. The original building was divided into dining rooms, one of which was painted yellow and separated by 3/4 height walls, and a kitchen in the northwest portion of the building. Between the "yellow room" and other dining rooms there was a hallway lined with six nooks where slot machines were located. These nooks remain intact in size and shape but shelving has been added. A money counting room at the south end of the Poinsettia Room had a private exit to the east.

=== The bar ===
The bar located to the north of the restaurant is connected to it by decking with picnic tables. It is a rectangular building with windows that match those of the restaurant, and has a south facing door. Patrons in the deck area are served through a wood-shuttered opening east of the door. There is an additional door and a small projecting storage room on the west side. The interior decoration of the bar is distinct; a large bar of everglades bamboo topped with old ship decking and accentuated by a mirror is the dominant feature of the room. It is decorated with objects found washed up on the shore while the building was built. The floor and roof are Dade County pine while the ceiling beams and walls are pecky cypress. During the time there was gambling at Cap's Place, there was a Wheel of Fortune and curtained alcoves. The alcoves have since been boarded up but the outlines remain visible on the walls. The bar and restaurant are decorated throughout with flotsam and jetsam and memorabilia.

=== Other buildings ===
Soon after the initial construction a fish house was built on pilings over the water. This small rectangular building was used for fish cleaning and dish washing; dirty water and fish scraps were dumped into the water. Over time the shoreline has silted in, and this structure is now used for storage. The pilings that had elevated it above the water remain visible. The buildings of Cap's Place are connected by a series of decks, piers and docks. While the shoreline has changed, these structures remain intact. A boat house where the owners lived on the site has been extensively repaired and reconstructed, and is not considered historic because of this. A six-room bunkhouse built to provide housing for restaurant workers no longer exists.

== History ==
In 1928 Eugene Theodore "Cap" Knight and Albert Hasis beached a dredging barge on a small peninsula in the Hillsboro Inlet and built a restaurant on its stripped base. They named the restaurant Club Unique, but it was always known as "Cap's Place". Knight had operated a store and restaurant nearby since 1920. The location of the previous business was subject to severe weather, and the site no longer exists due to coastal erosion. He had also been engaged in rum-running for some time.

The barge, purchased for US$100 (equivalent to about $1,819 in 2025), was originally beached about a half a mile from its current location. It was moved due to expansion of the Intracoastal Waterway; the hawser ropes used are wrapped around a large piling in the bar.

From the beginning it was clear that Club Unique would be a speakeasy with gambling and dining. By the end of 1929, the club had expanded with the construction of a number of other buildings. Knight also operated a separate gambling barge nearby in the 1940s. Cap's Place is historically important locally, to Florida and the United States as an early local commercial enterprise run by one of the original settlers in the area, and as a part of the rum-running and gambling history of southern Florida and the US. Author Carmen McGarry wrote about Cap's Place, "A landmark comparable to no other in south Florida, it has withstood prohibition, mobsters, depression, wars, the ravages of nature, and many joyful and peaceful times for nearly a century."

One unique aspect of Cap's Place was that it was only accessible by water (until 1953). Patrons would drive to Hillsboro beach and flash their headlights, signalling an employee who would row across the water and take them to the restaurant. Cap's Place is now accessible by road, but only handicap parking is available on-site, and most patrons continue to be ferried by boat.

The restaurant had unusual items on the menu and a reputation for very fresh seafood. With its rustic setting, outstanding menu and the added draw of drinking, and later gambling, Club Unique has been popular and successful since its opening. During the gambling era private memberships to the "supper club" were sold for 25 cents. It was a significant location for rum-running during Prohibition. The Hillsboro Club across the Intracoastal did not serve alcohol, and customers would come to Cap's Place to drink. Originally the dinner menu was just shrimp, snapper, pompano, Spanish mackerel, fried oysters, and chicken. Knight "didn't didn't even believe in dessert. 'If we haven't fed 'em enough, we're doing something wrong'", according to Talle Hasis.

=== Eugene and Lola Knight ===
Eugene "Cap" Knight was born in or near the Canaveral lighthouse, Cape Canaveral, Florida in 1871. His father, his grandfather and later his brother worked as lighthouse keepers in Florida. Knight was one of the earliest settlers in the Hillsboro Beach area. From a seafaring family, he left home at 13 to join the merchant marine. He started as mess boy on a lighthouse tender and left the service 35 years later in 1919 as a Master of Morgan Line Steamers, sailing between New Orleans and New York.

In 1916 Knight married his second wife, Lola Saunders, a schoolteacher for the children of lighthouse employees and fishermen of Hillsboro Inlet. Knight's previous marriage, to Bertha Lydia Armour, produced three children and ended in divorce before 1914. Lola Saunders, the daughter of a circuit riding Methodist preacher, was born in a log cabin near Cross Creek in an area now part of the Ocala National Forest.

When Prohibition started in 1920, the couple got involved in rum-running. The Hillsboro Inlet Lighthouse guided Eugene Knight as he returned from Bimini with burlap sacks full of illegal liquor called "hams". It has been suggested that his brother Tom the lighthouse keeper may have signaled him when "the coast was clear". The sacks of liquor would be tied to buoys and sunk, to be hauled up later. Knight's boat was faster than those of the Coast Guard, and he was never caught.

Another brother, Burnham Gray Knight, has been called the founder of charter fishing.

Historian Wesley Stout called Eugene Knight an "outstanding character of Broward County." Author Carmen McGarry wrote, "Cap was truly a legend of his time."

Lola Knight later recalled, "many a night hauling those sacks of liquor up the beach" and making runs to deliver to their customers. When asked if she was scared, she replied, "Scared? We were never scared. I'm not afraid of the devil himself, and neither was Cap." She slept with a loaded pistol under her pillow and often worked as hostess for the restaurant wearing a cotton dress, diamond necklace and no shoes. A story she often told was of Henry Flagler eating a favorite dish at Cap's Place, fresh pompano, then later writing the word "pompano" on one of his railroad maps; the location became Pompano Beach, Florida.

The barge Cap's Place was built on was previously owned by Flagler and he had used it in constructing his Overseas Railroad. She also related that Meyer Lansky would stop by weekly to pick up 10 to 12 percent of the gambling profits (Hasis also mentioned Lansky's involvement). Lola Knight said, "We paid off everybody." Illegal gambling casinos were to become a substantial part of the fabric of south Florida, with 52 of them operating openly in Broward County by 1950. The couple had other business interests including a fleet of fishing boats, a wholesale fish market and a fishing camp in the everglades. The building on stilts above the water now known as the boat house was their home for thirty years. Eugene Knight died in 1964 and Lola Knight died in 1989. They are buried beside each other in the Pompano Beach Cemetery.

=== Albert Hasis and Sylvester Love ===
Around 1926 Knight met and befriended the 16 year old Albert Hasis from Pittsburgh, Pennsylvania. Hassis had also left home at the age of 13. The friendship and partnership they developed lasted the remainder of their lives. Together they built and ran Club Unique. Hasis built the distinctive bar featuring a large carved bowsprit salvaged from the sunken wreck of a 200 year old Spanish galleon. The bar is built from bamboo and polished wood from ship's decks; an oil portrait of Knight hangs over the bar. Hasis met and married Patricia "Pat" McBride in 1945. Knight had never bought the land the restaurant was built on, Patricia Hasis borrowed $5,000 and bought the 1,000 feet of land on the Intracoastal Waterway. Albert and Patricia Hasis died in 1982 and are buried in the Deerfield Beach Cemetery.

In 1940 Sylvester Love came to work at the Club Unique, starting as a dishwasher, he advanced to chef. The son of a sharecropper, he left home in Georgia at 12. Love was chef at the restaurant for 48 years until 1985. He always wore a white chef's coat, starched apron and high white chef's hat even when the kitchen was 100 degrees, according to Hasis' daughter, Talle Hasis. In contrast "Cap" Knight wore bib overalls and Lola Knight was known for going barefoot. He described Knight as a tough "but good man (who) took me in. He recalled coming to work one morning finding a woman sitting on the dock who had lost $48,000 on the wheel saying, "Oh there were some big spenders...Those were the days. He said of his time at the restaurant, "You know it's hard work, but I've enjoyed every minute of it. No regrets at all." Love was a guest on the television show Good Morning America about 1987 discussing his experiences working at the restaurant. After retiring as chef he continued to work at the restaurant, preparing it for opening and overseeing the daily fresh fish deliveries until his death in 1990.

== Modern times ==
Cap's Place enjoyed its peak popularity in the 1930s and 1940s when locals and tourists frequented the establishment to dine, drink, and gamble. At the time there was limousine service from the upscale Palm Beach County hotels. It continues to be popular with celebrities; artists, sports figures, movie stars, and the socially prominent patronize the establishment. Oral histories suggest Winston Churchill and Franklin D. Roosevelt may have dined there one night while attending strategy meetings for World War II at the nearby estate of Secretary of State Edward R. Stettinius. While the story of Churchill and Roosevelt's visit has been discredited, Churchill did visit, dining in the yellow room. A partial list of notable visitors includes Meyer Lansky, Al Capone, Humphrey Bogart, Myrna Loy, Jack Dempsey, Casey Stengel, Bill Clinton, George Harrison, Mariah Carey, Jim Belushi, George Wendt and Gordon Ramsey. According to author Philip Weidling, "all the society of Palm Beach ate there at one time or another." Patricia Hasis established a rule, still in effect, that staff is prohibited from bothering celebrities, violation can result in immediate dismissal. Patricia Hasis said, "`We have a more interesting clientele because people really have to look for us." The repeal of prohibition in 1933 saw the end of rum-running. Legal pressures put an end to gambling at Cap's Place in the 1950s. When Eugene Knight died, Albert and Patricia Hasis and Lola Knight continued to run the restaurant. Lola Knight remained active in running the restaurant until 1959. Eugene Knight had not paid taxes and when he died the IRS placed liens on the property. Patricia Hasis paid the debts over time. As a part of the agreement to pay the tax debt and take control of the restaurant Hasis provided housing and care for Lola Knight for the rest of her life.

=== New ownership ===
Since the 1970s the restaurant has been run by the Hasis' three children, Talle, Ted and Tom. As a child, Talle Hasis would sit outside the restaurant with her tea service, selling little cups of water to the patrons and collecting five dollar tips. She is named after the state capital. On August 10, 1990, Cap's Place was added to the US National Register of Historic Places. There was some local objection to this listing. Neighbors complained the place was unsightly and characterized the attempt to have it listed as a tax dodge. The nomination was prepared by Research Atlantica for the Hasis siblings. In 1991 the City of Lighthouse point designated Cap's Place as a historic structure, the first such designation by the city. An important impact of this designation is based on a law passed earlier that year Cap's Place would be able to rebuild after a catastrophe. Prior to the passage of the law and subsequent designation the restaurant would have been prohibited from rebuilding as it is located in a residential zone. These actions were met with opposition in the community and were controversial because Tom Hasis was a city commissioner. The former mayor of Lighthouse Point, Leo Bentz, raised concerns about commercialization of the area, that the establishment could be expanded and that with no controls over Cap's Place the bar could stay open until 2AM. Hasis abstained in both votes and both measures passed 4–0. He continues to be active in local politics.

In the early 1990s a road was built on the peninsula known as Cap's Island and luxury homes were built to the north and south of the restaurant. Lot prices were close to $1.5 million. A menu from Cap's Place was included in a time capsule by the Broward League of Cities in 2000. Cap's Place was featured in a 2012 public television documentary, Prohibition and the South Florida Connection. In 2012 it was also used a filming location for the television show The Glades.

As of 2009 the Hasis siblings were joint owners. A 2017 newspaper article identifies Tom Hasis as "one of the owners of Cap's Place". His wife, Maureen Hasis, is also involved in running the restaurant. When asked about the future in 2013, Talle Hasis noted none of the siblings have children and said, "I guess when they take us out horizontally, which is the only way we'll be leaving, that will be it." She has also said, when asked about retiring, "That word's not in my vocabulary, if anything, I'll be sitting out there in Cap's rocking chair, barking orders." As of 2023 the establishment continues to operate as a restaurant, shuttling guests from a dock near the parking area to the restaurant's dock, and is being considered for a stop on the Fort Lauderdale water taxi route.

=== Present day ===
The approach through narrow winding residential streets in Lighthouse Point, followed by a boat ride to the restaurant coupled with the rustic setting and decor create a unique dining experience. The ceilings are low and the floors crooked but Talle Hasis tells those who complain, "Just duck your head down. My father built a strong place, low on the land." The menu includes all types of fresh fish, crabs, lobster and grouper chowder. It has been updated from the past and now includes appetizers and even key lime pie for dessert. In the past green turtle steaks and turtle egg pancakes with guava jelly were also featured. In 1963 Knight was arrested for possession of illegal turtle eggs, of an endangered species. Knight had been known to keep thousands of turtle eggs frozen. Very fresh seafood is a hallmark of the restaurant. In 2005 they were still buying their fish fresh daily from Captain Murphy a local fisherman as they had for decades. All meals are cooked to order. A house specialty, hearts of palm salad is made with sabal palm from the Everglades and Lake Okeechobee. The hearts of palm have been supplied by the same Seminole family since the restaurant opened. Meals come with hot rolls and homemade Sea Grape jelly. Cap's Place has been positively reviewed from the 1980s to the present. Prices are moderately expensive. The restaurant relies mostly on word of mouth and doesn't advertise much. It has been called one of south Florida's most colorful landmarks.
