= Walnut Street Ferry =

Walnut Street Ferry refers to the following ferries:

- Walnut Street Ferry (Mississippi River) defunct ferry across the Mississippi River from New Orleans, Louisiana to Westwego, Louisiana
- Walnut Street Ferry in New York City, established 1817, renamed the Jackson Street Ferry and later the Gouverneur Street Ferry, shut down in 1868
