= Assembly of God Bethlehem Ministry =

Church in Maryland, United States

Assembly of God of Belém Pará, Brazil
- Assembleia de Deus - Igreja Mãe de Belém do Pará 1911
- Assembly of God of Belém Pará, Brazil
- Location: Silver Spring, Maryland (US Headquarters)
- Country: United States
- Denomination: Assembly of God
- Website: www.adbelem.org.br

History
- Founded: 2018
- Founder: Honório Pinto

The Assembly of God Bethlehem Ministry is a Pentecostal organization within the Brazilian Assembleias de Deus. It is a 'ministry', a non-territorial episcopal polity-organization with subordinate churches and congregations in different parts of Brazil and the world.

== Organization ==
In the Brazilian Assembleias de Deus each 'Ministry' is a directed by a mother-church under a pastor-president (also called Senior Pastor in various Ministries) with affiliated congregations and preaching points. The mother church receives tithes and manages the funds of the affiliated local churches, as well as assign pastors for the local congregations. There is a strong influence of pastoral leadership on the decision-taking process, and the members only rubber stamp the 'Ministry' decisions.

Among the major ministries stands the Assembly of God Bethlehem Ministry, which has about 2,200 churches concentrated in south-central Brazil. Currently, the Bethlehem Ministry is presided by Pastor José Wellington Bezerra da Costa, who succeeded Pastor Cicero Canuto de Lima in 1989.

== History ==
The Belém ministério is a misnomer, since it is headquartered not in Belém do Pará, but in the Belenzinho neighborhood in São Paulo city. This ministério began as a local schism of an Italian Pentecostal church in 1928. This novel church succeeded in attracting migrants, especially from the poverty and drought-stricken Northeast Brazil. With time, the Ministério do Belém grew not only in membership, but also in influence within the politics of the General Convention of the Assemblies of God of Brazil. As a consequence, two of Ministério Belém pastor-president also were chair to the General Convention.

Since January 6, 1980, Assemblies of God Bethlehem Ministry responded spiritually for more than 2,000 churches and congregations formed in São Paulo, Mato Grosso do Sul, and abroad the United States, South America, Europe and Africa.

In 1995, Assembly of God Bethlehem Ministry in USA was founded by Severino Pedro da Silva in the United States. The Ministry has been expanding with over 50 congregations in North America, Europe, Australia, and Africa.

== Assembly of God Bethlehem Ministry-USA ==
The Bethlehem Ministry operates in the United States since the mid-1990s. The Bethlehem Ministry has its North American headquarters in Lighthouse Point, Florida. The Assembly of God Bethlehem Ministry-USA has assimilated the former Portuguese-speaking District of the Assemblies of God into its Ministry structure. The churches affiliated with the Bethlehem Ministry-USA do not have internal autonomy as their American counterpart, as all the church propriety and decisions are in the hands of the pastor-president.

Joel F. Costa, son of José Wellington Bezerra da Costa, directs the Bethlehem Ministries in the US and many other countries on behalf of his father.

Different from other Assemblies of God in the US, the Bethlehem Ministry does not ordain or accept women into pastoral office.

=== JW Bible college ===
The JW Bible College is a non-profit corporation registered in the State of Florida in the United States, operating since 1998.

=== Bethlehem Broadcasting Network ===
Bethlehem Broadcasting Network (BBN) – broadcasts live services on their website. BBN also has on-demand services.

== People ==
- Pastor José Wellington Bezerra da Costa – President of the Assemblies of God in Brazil
- Pastor Joel F. Costa – Senior Pastor of the Assembly of God Bethlehem Ministry-USA

== See also ==
- List of Assemblies of God people
- Assembly of God
- Assembleias de Deus
- Assembly of God Bethlehem Ministry (Congregations)
