= Lighthouse Point, Florida =

- City
- City of Lighthouse Point
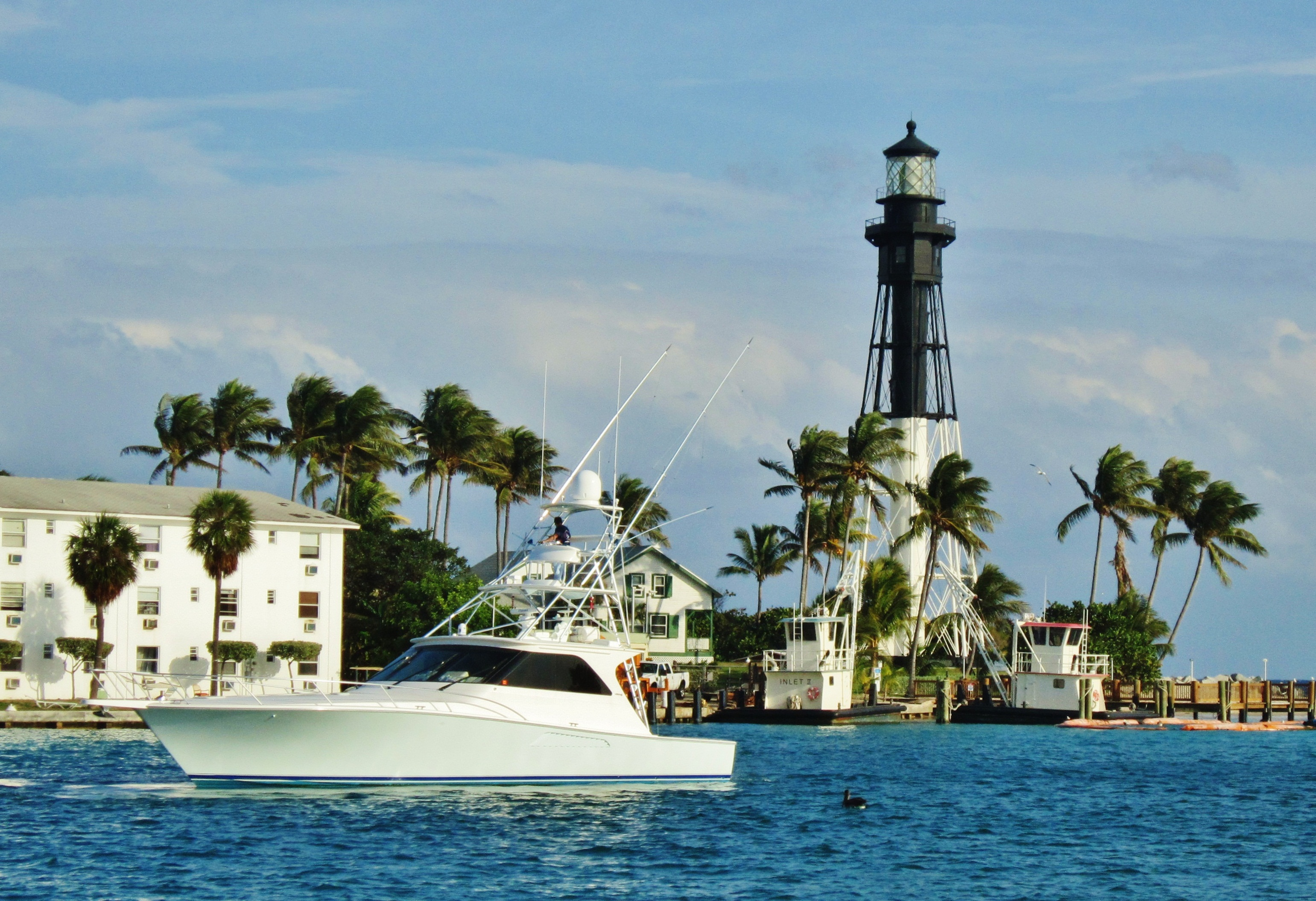
- Boat sailing in the Inlet

- Seal
- Nickname: LHP
- Location of Lighthouse Point in Broward County in State of Florida
- Coordinates: 26°16′43″N 80°05′21″W
- Country: United States
- State: Florida
- County: Broward
- Settled (Hillsboro Isles Settlement): c. 1947–1951
- Incorporated (Town of Lighthouse Point): June 13, 1956
- Incorporated (City of Lighthouse Point): June 11, 1957

Government
  - Type: Mayor-Commission

Area
  - City: 2.39 sq mi (6.19 km^{2})
  - Land: 2.31 sq mi (5.97 km^{2})
  - Water: 0.085 sq mi (0.22 km^{2}) 4.58%
- Elevation: 7 ft (2.1 m)

Population (2020)
  - City: 10,486
  - Density: 4,546.0/sq mi (1,755.21/km^{2})
  - Metro: 6,166,488
- Time zone: UTC-5 (EST)
  - Summer (DST): UTC-4 (EDT)
- ZIP codes: 33064, 33074
- Area codes: 754, 954
- FIPS code: 12-40450
- GNIS feature ID: 2404926
- Website: https://www.lighthousepointfl.gov/

Lighthouse Point, officially the City of Lighthouse Point, is a suburb of Fort Lauderdale located in Broward County, Florida, United States. The suburb was named for the Hillsboro Inlet Lighthouse, which is located in nearby Hillsboro Beach. The city is a part of the Miami metropolitan area of South Florida. As of the 2020 census, the population of Lighthouse Point was 10,486.

== Geography ==
According to the United States Census Bureau, the city has a total area of 2.4 square miles (6 km^{2}), of which 2.29 square miles (6 km^{2}) is land and .11 square miles (0 km^{2}) (4.58%) is water.

Lighthouse Point is located in northeastern Broward County. It is adjacent to the following municipalities:

To its north:

- Deerfield Beach

To its east:

- Hillsboro Beach (across the Intracoastal Waterway)

To its west and south:

- Pompano Beach

Lighthouse Point is known for boating as the vast majority of the city is built on canals built during the 1950s to 1960s. This created a large amount of water front housing and made boating and fishing popular.

Through the Hillsboro Inlet, boats can reach the Bahamas within 40 miles to Bimini or 60 miles to Grand Bahama.

== Demographics ==
Historical population
Census	Pop.	Note	%±
1960	2,453		—
1970	9,071		269.8%
1980	11,488		26.6%
1990	10,378		−9.7%
2000	10,767		3.7%
2010	10,344		−3.9%
2020	10,486		1.4%
U.S. Decennial Census

=== 2020 census ===
As of the 2020 census, Lighthouse Point had a population of 10,486. The median age was 53.5 years. 13.6% of residents were under the age of 18 and 26.1% of residents were 65 years of age or older. For every 100 females, there were 99.4 males, and for every 100 females age 18 and over, there were 98.6 males age 18 and over.

100.0% of residents lived in urban areas, while 0.0% lived in rural areas.

There were 5,048 households in Lighthouse Point, of which 18.7% had children under the age of 18 living in them. Of all households, 47.5% were married-couple households, 20.5% were households with a male householder and no spouse or partner present, and 25.3% were households with a female householder and no spouse or partner present. About 34.8% of all households were made up of individuals, and 16.9% had someone living alone who was 65 years of age or older.

There were 5,856 housing units, of which 13.8% were vacant. The homeowner vacancy rate was 2.7% and the rental vacancy rate was 9.4%.

Lighthouse Point racial composition (Hispanics excluded from racial categories) (NH = Non-Hispanic)
Race	Number	Percentage
White (NH)	8,523	81.28%
Black or African American (NH)	140	1.34%
Native American or Alaska Native (NH)	5	0.05%
Asian (NH)	198	1.89%
Pacific Islander or Native Hawaiian (NH)	4	0.04%
Some other race (NH)	48	0.46%
Two or more races/Multiracial (NH)	387	3.69%
Hispanic or Latino (any race)	1,181	11.26%
Total	10,486	

=== 2020 estimates ===
According to the 2020 American Community Survey 5-year estimates, there were 3,025 families residing in the city.

=== 2010 census ===
Lighthouse Point Demographics
2010 Census	Lighthouse Point	Broward County	Florida
Total population	10,344	1,748,066	18,801,310
Population, percent change, 2000 to 2010	–3.9%	+7.7%	+17.6%
Population density	4,484.0/sq mi	1,444.9/sq mi	350.6/sq mi
White or Caucasian (including White Hispanic)	94.0%	63.1%	75.0%
(Non-Hispanic White or Caucasian)	87.7%	43.5%	57.9%
Black or African-American	1.7%	26.7%	16.0%
Hispanic or Latino (of any race)	7.5%	25.1%	22.5%
Asian	1.6%	3.2%	2.4%
Native American or Native Alaskan	0.3%	0.3%	0.4%
Pacific Islander or Native Hawaiian	0.0%	0.1%	0.1%
Two or more races (Multiracial)	1.6%	2.9%	2.5%
Some Other Race	0.8%	3.7%	3.6%

As of the 2010 United States census, there were 10,344 people, 4,555 households, and 2,839 families residing in the city.

=== 2000 census ===
In 2000, 19.5% had children under the age of 18 living with them, 50.7% were married couples living together, 6.0% had a female householder with no husband present, and 40.4% were non-families. 33.6% of all households were made up of individuals, and 16.3% had someone living alone who was 65 years of age or older. The average household size was 2.08 and the average family size was 2.65.

In 2000, the city's age distribution was spread out, with 16.2% of people under the age of 18, 3.4% from 18 to 24 years old, 27.1% from 25 to 44, 30.1% from 45 to 64, and 23.2% who were 65 years of age or older. The median age was 47 years. For every 100 women, there were 91.8 men.

As of 2000, the median income for a household in the city was $53,038, and the median income for a family was $72,418. Males had a median income of $51,897 versus $32,929 for females. The per capita income for the city was $40,839. About 2.6% of families and 5.0% of the population were below the poverty line, including 3.8% of those under age 18 and 6.5% of those age 65 or over.

As of 2000, 74.64% of residents spoke Spanish and 19.18% spoke English as their first language. Other languages spoken in Lighthouse Point as a first language are Italian at 1.93%, French at 1.22%, German at 1.06% and Portuguese at 0.71%.

== Media ==
Lighthouse Point is part of the Miami-Fort Lauderdale-Hollywood media market, which is the twelfth largest radio market and the seventeenth largest television market in the United States. Its primary daily newspapers are the South Florida Sun-Sentinel and The Miami Herald, and their Spanish-language counterparts El Sentinel and El Nuevo Herald.

Each house, apartment and business in Lighthouse Point receives the monthly lifestyle magazine "Lighthouse Point" created and mailed by publishers Susan and Richard Rosser.

== Education ==
Broward County Public Schools serves the community. All residents are zoned to Norcrest Elementary School (Pompano Beach), Deerfield Beach Middle School, and Deerfield Beach High School (located in Deerfield Beach). It is also in the service area of the magnet school Pompano Beach High School.

Originally North Broward Preparatory School was located in the city. It was established there in 1957, but is no longer located in Lighthouse Point.

== Lighthouse Point Library ==
Mission Statement: The Doreen Gauthier Lighthouse Point Library was established (1965) for the purpose of providing community members of all ages with informational, recreational, cultural, and educational enrichment through access to print materials, digital resources, current technologies, services, programs, and a professional library staff.

The first part-time library was a small room in the Beacon Light Shopping Center where the owner gave this area rent free for three months as a gesture of goodwill. The branch began building its collection with duplicate copies of titles from Pompano and Deerfield Beach Libraries, as well as donations from the general public. On March 30, 1965, a glamorous Library Ball was held, with the Lighthouse Point Bank underwriting the cost of the event as well as cosponsoring the affair. The event raised over $5,000. By 1966 the library owned more than 3,000 items, and the tradition of having a Library Ball was continued annually from 1966 to 1971. In January 1968 a lease was signed for a rental of two empty stores in the Venetian Isles Shopping Center, and by this point the library had 921 members. Circulation grew from 314 books in 1965 to over 10,000 books in 1968. In 1972, the Library began to function under the jurisdiction of the City of Lighthouse Point. In 1984, the Publix in the Venetian Sopping center announced its plan to take over the entire shopping area, and the contents of the library was moved into a huge trailed unit in November 1985 and stored on the grounds of the Trinity United Methodist Church. The city commission pitched an idea to build a complex with the library as a focal point, and in the meantime library staff worked out of the storage unit. It wasn't until May 1987 that the move into the current permanent library began with over 20,000 items and more than 7,000 library memberships.

The library has a print collection of over 40,000 circulating titles, patron wifi access, public computers, a fax machine, scanning and printing, AWE Kids Learning Stations, Overdrive eBooks and streaming audio-books, access to the Florida Electronic Library and digital research databases, audio books on CD, DVDs, magazines and newspapers, study rooms (by appointment), and exam proctoring (by appointment only).

== Notable people ==
- Paul Castronovo, radio personality
- Ben Klassen, founder of the religion Creativity
- Bruce Nickells, harness racing driver
- Mike Phipps, College Football Hall of Fame member
- Nevin Shapiro, University of Miami football booster, currently imprisoned for a $930 million Ponzi scheme
- John Spadavecchia, professional poker player
