= Walnut Street Ferry (Mississippi River) =

Ferry in US

The Walnut Street Ferry in New Orleans, Louisiana, United States; connected Walnut Street in the Greenville section of New Orleans (just upriver from Audubon Park, New Orleans) with Sala Avenue in Westwego, Louisiana across the Mississippi River for over half a century. It carried rail traffic as well as pedestrians and automobiles.

Use declined with the opening of the Huey P. Long Bridge (Jefferson Parish) in 1935, with most rail traffic using that new route which did not require the time and trouble of sectioning trains to load them on to ferries. The ferry was finally discontinued following damage in the 1947 New Orleans Hurricane.
