= Hillsboro Beach, Florida =

Town in the state of Florida, United States

- Town
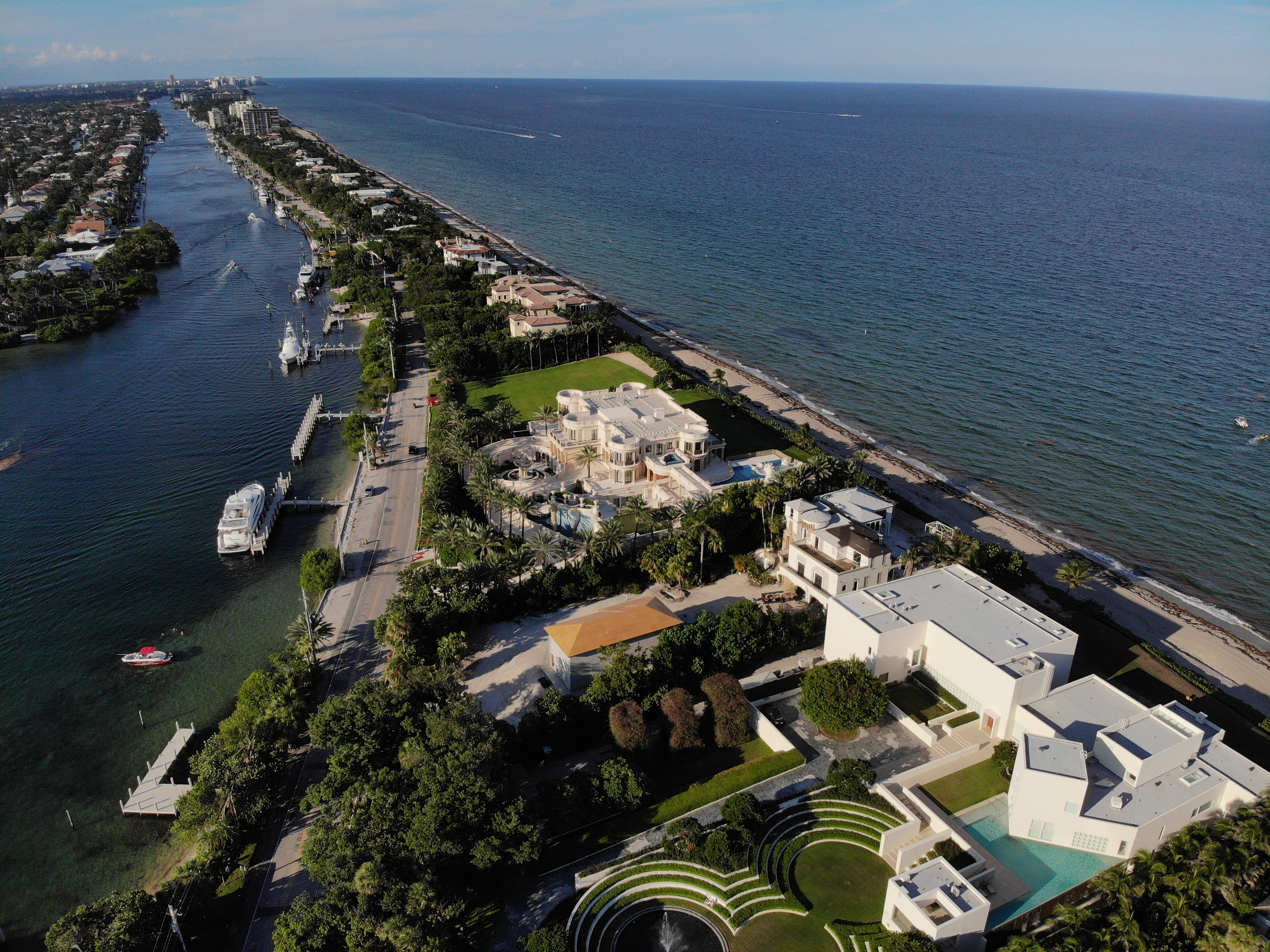
- Aerial view of a few Hillsboro Beach houses

- Seal
- Nickname: "Millionaires' Mile"
- Motto: "Florida's Magnificent Mile"
- Location of Hillsboro Beach in Broward County, Florida
- Coordinates: 26°16′53″N 80°04′49″W
- Country: United States
- State: Florida
- County: Broward
- Settled (Hillsboro Beach): c. 1922–1925
- Unofficially Incorporated (Town of Hillsboro Beach): June 12, 1939
- Officially Incorporated (Town of Hillsboro Beach): March 4, 1947
- Reincorporated (Town of Hillsboro Beach): 1969
- Named for: Earl of Hillsborough

Government
  - Mayor: Dawn Miller
  - Vice Mayor: David A. Ravanesi
  - Commissioners: Jane Reiser, Vinnie Andreano, and Heather Berman
  - Town Manager: William "Mac" Serda
  - Town Clerk: Sherry D. Henderson

Area
  - Town: 1.45 sq mi (3.75 km^{2})
  - Land: 0.37 sq mi (0.95 km^{2})
  - Water: 1.08 sq mi (2.80 km^{2})
- Elevation: 0 ft (0 m)

Population (2020)
  - Town: 1,987
  - Density: 5,433.3/sq mi (2,097.79/km^{2})
  - Metro: 6,166,488
- Time zone: UTC-5 (EST)
  - Summer (DST): UTC-4 (EDT)
- ZIP code: 33062
- Area codes: 954, 754
- FIPS code: 12-30850
- GNIS feature ID: 2405839
- Website: www.townofhillsborobeach.com

Hillsboro Beach is a town in Broward County, Florida, United States. The town is part of the Miami metropolitan area. Its population was 1,987 at the 2020 census.

== History ==
Hillsboro Beach was named for the Earl of Hillsborough, who received large grants of Florida's land from the English Crown while it was part of East Florida, a British colonial possession.

The first permanent structure built was the Hillsboro Inlet Lighthouse, in 1907. But it wasn't until 1922, when Herbert L. Malcolm bought the land next to it and built a school. In 1925, the school into a hotel, which became the Hillsboro Club.

The Town of Hillsboro Beach was incorporated as a municipality on June 12, 1939, but remained inactive until March 4, 1947, when it was officially incorporated by a special act of the Florida Legislature, and reincorporated in 1969.

The current town hall was built in 1955. Before that, it was a tiny wooden building that would use Cap's Place to make and receive phone calls, especially during WWII.

The 3.2-mile (5.1 km) strip along Florida State Road A1A is officially known as "Hillsboro Mile" in the town's boundaries, and it's the only main road in town. Because this is the only main public road, it is aligned with the residents' mansions and commonly called "Millionaires' Mile" by both local residents and visitors alike. Its own official motto also notes this by referring to it as "Florida's Magnificent Mile".

Since the town's earliest years, the population doubles during wintertime.

== Geography ==
The Town of Hillsboro Beach is located in northeastern Broward County, along the Atlantic Ocean.

Hillsboro Beach is on the south end of the barrier island locally known as Deerfield Beach Island or Deerfield Cay.

According to the United States Census Bureau, the town has a total area of 1.5 square miles (3.8 km^{2}), of which 0.35 square miles (0.9 km^{2}) is land and 1.1 square miles (2.8 km^{2}) (74.87%) is water.

=== Climate ===
The Town of Hillsboro Beach has a tropical climate, similar to the climate found in much of the Caribbean. It is part of the only region in the 48 contiguous states that falls under that category. More specifically, it generally has a tropical savanna climate (Köppen climate classification: Aw), bordering a tropical monsoon climate (Köppen climate classification: Am).

Climate data for Hillsboro Beach, FL
Month	Jan	Feb	Mar	Apr	May	Jun	Jul	Aug	Sep	Oct	Nov	Dec	Year
Record high °F (°C)	90.0 (32.2)	90.0 (32.2)	92.0 (33.3)	100.0 (37.8)	99.0 (37.2)	100.0 (37.8)	101.0 (38.3)	99.0 (37.2)	99.0 (37.2)	97.0 (36.1)	96.0 (35.6)	89.0 (31.7)	101.0 (38.3)
Mean daily maximum °F (°C)	76.0 (24.4)	77.0 (25.0)	80.0 (26.7)	83.0 (28.3)	87.0 (30.6)	90.0 (32.2)	92.0 (33.3)	92.0 (33.3)	91.0 (32.8)	87.0 (30.6)	82.0 (27.8)	78.0 (25.6)	84.6 (29.2)
Mean daily minimum °F (°C)	58.0 (14.4)	58.0 (14.4)	62.0 (16.7)	66.0 (18.9)	71.0 (21.7)	74.0 (23.3)	75.0 (23.9)	75.0 (23.9)	74.0 (23.3)	71.0 (21.7)	66.0 (18.9)	61.0 (16.1)	67.6 (19.8)
Record low °F (°C)	25.0 (−3.9)	21.0 (−6.1)	32.0 (0.0)	40.0 (4.4)	50.0 (10.0)	40.0 (4.4)	53.0 (11.7)	59.0 (15.0)	57.0 (13.9)	44.0 (6.7)	35.0 (1.7)	28.0 (−2.2)	21.0 (−6.1)
Average precipitation inches (mm)	2.78 (71)	2.85 (72)	3.0 (76)	3.4 (86)	5.73 (146)	7.31 (186)	5.94 (151)	6.91 (176)	7.01 (178)	5.73 (146)	4.24 (108)	2.46 (62)	57.36 (1,457)
Source: "Hillsboro Beach, FL Weather Data". Weather.com.

== Demographics ==
Historical population
Census	Pop.	Note	%±
1950	84		—
1960	437		420.2%
1970	1,181		170.3%
1980	1,554		31.6%
1990	1,748		12.5%
2000	2,163		23.7%
2010	1,875		−13.3%
2020	1,987		6.0%
U.S. Decennial Census

=== Racial and ethnic composition ===
Hillsboro Beach racial composition (Hispanics excluded from racial categories) (NH = Non-Hispanic)
Race	Pop 2010	Pop 2020	% 2010	% 2020
White (NH)	1,736	1,755	92.59%	88.32%
Black or African American (NH)	6	16	0.32%	0.81%
Native American or Alaska Native (NH)	0	2	0.00%	0.10%
Asian (NH)	10	21	0.53%	1.06%
Pacific Islander or Native Hawaiian (NH)	0	1	0.00%	0.05%
Some other race (NH)	0	7	0.00%	0.35%
Two or more races/Multiracial (NH)	14	36	0.75%	1.81%
Hispanic or Latino (any race)	109	149	5.81%	7.50%
Total	1,875	1,987	100.00%	100.00%

=== 2020 census ===
As of the 2020 census, Hillsboro Beach had a population of 1,987. The median age was 66.8 years. 4.8% of residents were under the age of 18 and 53.3% were 65 years of age or older. For every 100 females there were 89.2 males, and for every 100 females age 18 and over there were 88.0 males age 18 and over.

100.0% of residents lived in urban areas, while 0.0% lived in rural areas.

There were 1,169 households in Hillsboro Beach, of which 8.0% had children under the age of 18 living in them. Of all households, 41.6% were married-couple households, 21.0% were households with a male householder and no spouse or partner present, and 32.8% were households with a female householder and no spouse or partner present. About 41.5% of all households were made up of individuals and 25.3% had someone living alone who was 65 years of age or older.

There were 2,428 housing units, of which 51.9% were vacant. The homeowner vacancy rate was 3.6% and the rental vacancy rate was 14.1%.

The United States Census Bureau's 2020 American Community Survey 5-year estimates reported 597 families residing in the town.

=== 2010 census ===
As of the 2010 United States census, there were 1,875 people, 979 households, and 514 families residing in the town.

=== 2000 census ===
In 2000, 3.0% had children under the age of 18 living with them, 50.2% were married couples living together, 3.1% had a female householder with no husband present, and 45.7% were non-families. 40.0% of all households were made up of individuals, and 24.0% had someone living alone who was 65 years of age or older. The average household size was 1.69 and the average family size was 2.13.

In 2000, the town population was spread out, with 3.2% under the age of 18, 1.1% from 18 to 24, 10.7% from 25 to 44, 34.0% from 45 to 64, and 51.0% who were 65 years of age or older. The median age was 65 years. For every 100 females, there were 81.2 males. For every 100 females age 18 and over, there were 79.9 males.

In 2000, the median income for a household in the town was $52,159, and the median income for a family was $70,163. Males had a median income of $61,974 versus $40,089 for females. The per capita income for the town was $56,634. About 4.1% of families and 8.0% of the population were below the poverty line, including none of those under age 18 and 8.6% of those age 65 or over.

As of 2000, speakers of English as their first language were 89.94% of the population, French speakers 4.04%, Italian speakers 2.64%, Spanish speakers 2.40%, while German speakers were at 0.96% of residents.

As of 2000, Hillsboro Beach was the twenty-second most Canadian-populated area in the US, along with several other areas, at 1.5% of residents.

== Education ==
Broward County Public Schools serves the community. All residents are zoned to Cresthaven Elementary School (Pompano Beach), Crystal Lake Middle School (Pompano Beach), and Deerfield Beach High School (located in Deerfield Beach).

== Media ==
Hillsboro Beach is part of the Miami-Fort Lauderdale-Hollywood media market, which is the twelfth-largest radio market and the seventeenth-largest television market in the United States. Its primary daily newspapers are the South Florida Sun-Sentinel and The Miami Herald, and their Spanish-language counterparts El Sentinel and El Nuevo Herald.
