= Hillsboro Inlet Light =

Lighthouse in Florida, United States

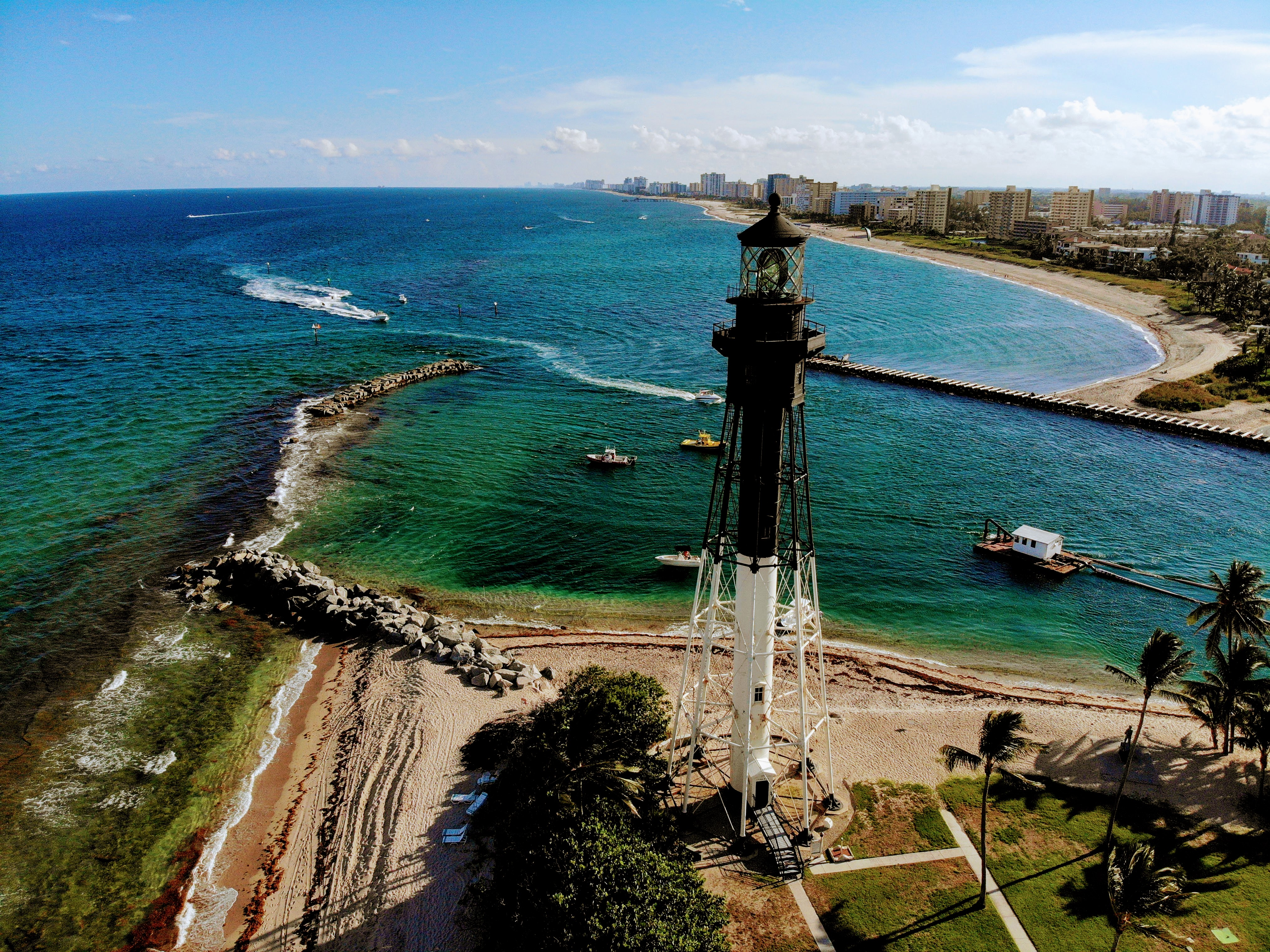
- Location: north side of Hillsboro Inlet
- Coordinates: 26°15′32″N 80°4′51″W

Tower
- Constructed: 1907
- Foundation: iron piling
- Construction: iron
- Automated: 1974
- Height: 42 m (138 ft)
- Shape: octagonal skeletal with cylinder
- Heritage: National Register of Historic Places listed place

Light
- First lit: 1907
- Focal height: 136 feet (41 m)
- Lens: second-order bivalve Fresnel lens
- Range: 28 nautical miles (52 km; 32 mi)
- Characteristic: White, Flashing every 20 seconds
- Hillsboro Inlet Light Station
- U.S. National Register of Historic Places
- Area: 3 acres (1.2 ha)
- NRHP reference No.: 79000661
- Added to NRHP: 16 February 1979

Hillsboro Inlet Lighthouse is a lighthouse located on the north side of Hillsboro Inlet, midway between Fort Lauderdale and Boca Raton, in Hillsboro Beach, Florida. The light marks the northern limit of the Florida Reef, an underwater coral formation on the lower east coast of the state.

== History ==
Hillsboro Point was designated as hazardous for the safe navigation of ships in 1855 and federal designation was sought. A request for a lighthouse at the inlet was first made in 1884. The request was repeated yearly and rejected 17 times. In 1901, the United States Lighthouse Board persuaded Congress to authorize the construction of a lighthouse in the dark area between Jupiter Inlet Light and Fowey Rocks Light. The official order approved on February 12, 1901, called for a "first-order light at or near Hillsboro Point...at a cost not to exceed $90,000." No appropriation of funds was made in 1901 and in 1902 $45,000 was appropriated. The full funding to build the lighthouse was appropriated on March 3, 1903. Initially a site on the south side of the inlet was selected, however it was not feasible, so a site on the north of the inlet was chosen. The owner of the property did not want to sell at first but after beginning condemnation proceedings, an agreement to purchase the land was reached. The 3 acre (1.2 ha) parcel was purchased for $150 from Elnathan T. Field and Mary W. Osborn of Middleton, New Jersey who had bought the land for 70 cents an acre (0.4 ha) from the Trustees of the Internal Improvement Fund. (Note: Lasky 2003 states the land was bought from Ezra Osborn. Penberthy 2016 gives the purchase price as $320)

Soon after the light was operational unexplained reports of fires in the Everglades began to come in. The cause was the lens, when stopped in the morning at just the right position, it would focus the sunlight west towards the wetlands. A landward baffle was installed. This also shielded nearby residents from the bright light at night.

Lightkeepers would assist shipwrecks using three 12 to 20 horsepower gas boats. The wives of the lighthouse keepers would make sea grape jelly to trade for pickled vegetables from local farmers. Four Coast Guard signalmen were stationed at the lighthouse in World War I barracked in one of the storehouses.

During the 1926 Miami hurricane J.B. Isler stood a 32-hour watch, keeping the light burning while fearing the lighthouse would fall. It stood but 20 feet (6.1 m) of sand was washed out from under it, according to Mary Ella Knight Voss, daughter of a prior lightkeeper. The storm also damaged the dwellings and carried away the boathouse and wharf. Isler's son George and daughter Ruth, born in the keeper's house, were the first children of record born at the Hillsboro Inlet.

The lighthouse beach patrol spotted a German U-boat in 1943, during World War II. The submarine was reportedly sunk, but no wreck has been documented. Later that year a freighter, the M.S. Arcura aroused the suspicion of a lighthouse keeper. The ship was being used as a raider and was crewed by German nationals and carrying arms. The crew were transported to Port Everglades and the Arcura became a war prize. (Note: McGarry 1997 describes these two wartime incidents as, "...significant--though undocumented--events that were rumored to have taken place...")

In 1974 the lighthouse was fully automated. One United States Coast Guardsman was assigned to remain on site to maintain the light and grounds. The assistant keepers' homes were converted to guest quarters for senior coast guard and other senior military officers. The Hillsboro Inlet Light Station was listed on the U.S. National Register of Historic Places on February 16, 1979. The lighthouse and buildings are little altered from their original construction in 1907.

In the second half of the 20th century, this inlet became an increasingly busy waterway. Hillsboro Inlet Light is considered one of the most powerful lights in the world with a beam that can be seen for 28 nautical miles (52 km; 32 mi). (Note: "Hillsboro lighthouse, which will celebrate its 100th birthday next year, not only boasts the strongest beam of any of the 20 active lighthouses in Florida, but in the entire world, according to Casselberry." Hibbard Casselberry was president of the Hillsboro Lighthouse Preservation Society. "'It's the strongest beam from a lighthouse in the world right now.' said Hib Casselberry.")

== The lighthouse ==
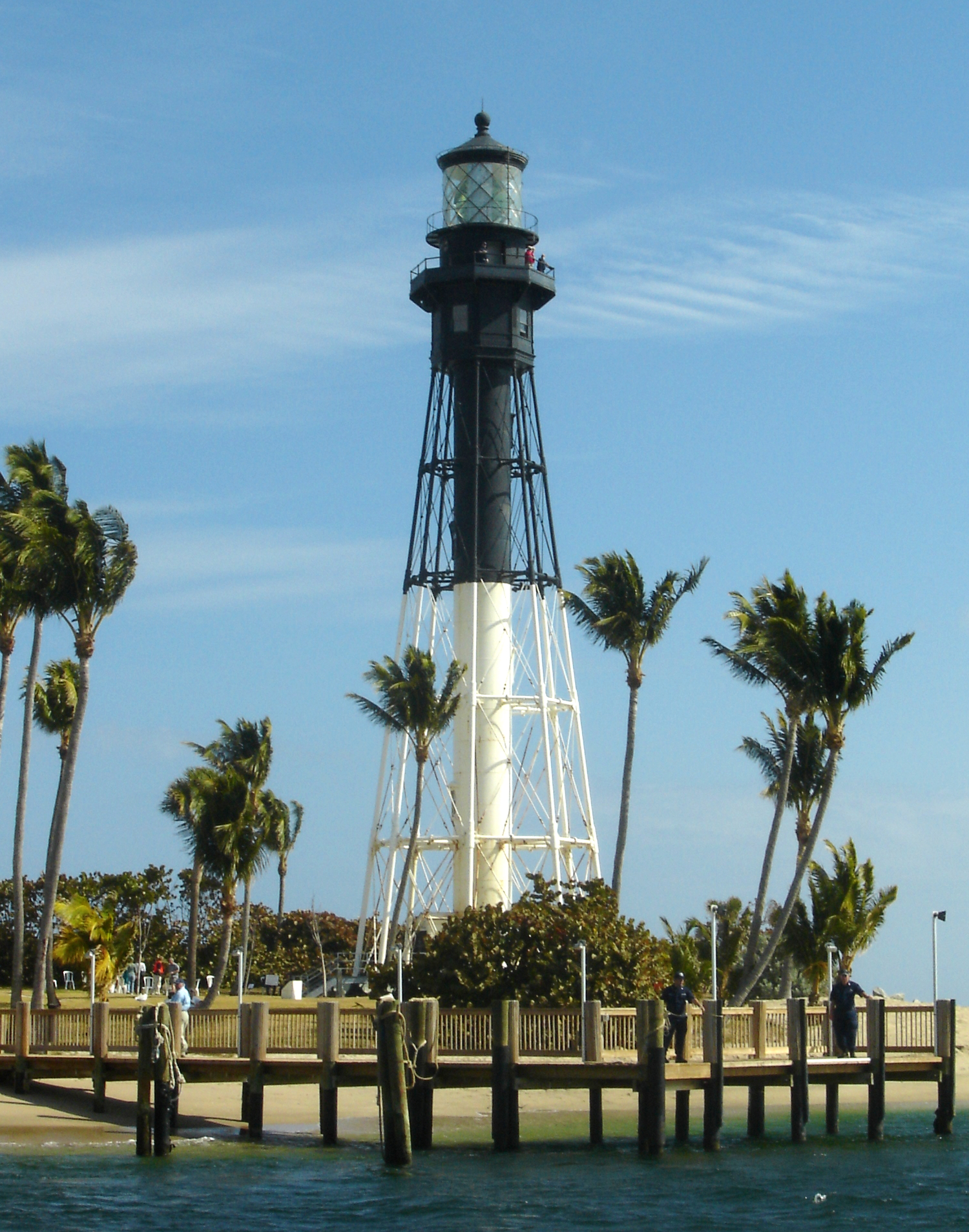
Hillsboro Inlet Lighthouse

The octagonal iron pyramidal tower was built by the Russel Wheel and Foundry in Detroit Michigan after entering the lowest bid at $24,000. The only other bid came from the Atlanta Machine Works, Atlanta, GA for $26,747. Work commenced in August 1905 working off plans for identical towers on Cape Fear, Cape Charles and Hog Island (of the three, only Cape Charles remains). Documents from the Foundry and William Craighill (District 7 & 8 Engineer in charge of the project) detail numerous errors which may have helped in the demise of the Cape Fear light. In the 1920s, errors in reporting began several myths that persist to this day. Among the long-held myths are the origins of the tower which stated that this lighthouse was built by a Chicago steel firm for the 1904 St. Louis World's Fair. (Note: Also, a 1986 newspaper article by Stuart McIver cited a 1925 Miami Herald newspaper article, "Long in Light Service" where the credit went the Champion Bridge Company of Wilmington, Ohio with manufacturing the structure.) It was then disassembled and moved to Hillsboro Inlet. The J.H. Gardner Construction Company of New Orleans, Louisiana cleared the land, laid the foundations and re-assembled and erected the lighthouse. The construction is held together with bolts there are no welds. Iron piping held together with 192 special cast iron joints and 80 tension rods with turnbuckles make up the structure.

It is supported by eight concrete foundations in a 40-foot (12 m) circle with a ninth at the center. It is an iron skeleton framework with a central column and a watch house. The inner column has circular stairs and space for the weights that were used to rotate the lens. It stands 132 feet (40 m) tall. (Note: The height of the lighthouse is reported differently in various sources: 135 feet (41 m); 136 feet (41 m); 137 feet (42 m); 142 feet (43 m) and 174 feet (53 m).) It was lit on March 8, 1907. It is one of the oldest structures in Broward County.

A description published at the time read, "The structure is an octagonal pyramidal, iron skeleton tower with central stair cylinder; the lower third of the structure is painted white; the upper two-thirds and the lantern are painted black. There are three white 1 1/2-story light-keepers dwellings in a row, about 100 feet to the northward of the light tower and a red brick oilhouse about fifty feet to the westward of the tower. There is also a boathouse near the inlet with boatways sixty feet long." The paint scheme was selected for daytime visibility, the lower portion white to stand out among trees, the top black to contrast with the daytime sky. The lighthouse has a cast iron roof with a finial. The main entrance faces north and has double doors in a vestibule. There is an iron balustrade separating the lantern from the watch room. The interior is iron with wood paneling and wood floors and ceiling in the watch room. (Note: Merinkers 1977 mentions only the wood floors and ceiling. Jamieson 1999 reports oak wood paneling was used in the restoration.) The watch room has five two over two double hung sash windows.

== The light ==
Its second-order bivalve Fresnel lens emits a light measuring 5.5 megacandelas and is placed 135 feet (41 m) above sea level. Although the order authorizing the lighthouse specified a first-order light, a second-order light and rotating mechanism was contracted for from Barbier, Bernard and Turenne of Paris, France at the cost of $7,250. The lens is 9 feet (2.7 m) in diameter and weighs 3,600 pounds (1,600 kg). It consists of 356 individual hand ground glass panels in a brass frame. (Note: Ferrechio 2000 describes the lens as, "...made up of 350 polished prisms..." Bartlett 1983 reports the lens has 102 panels.) The original light was an incandescent oil vapor lamp fueled with kerosene. At 370,000 candle power it could be seen from 35 miles (56 km) away at sea on a clear night.

The light assembly rotated on a liquid mercury reservoir, allowing up to one rotation per 15 seconds. The mercury was contained in a doughnut-shaped base and required filtering every 10 years to remove salt that accumulated. Rotation was driven by a weight on ropes through a gear mechanism. The amount of weight determined the speed of rotation. The weight had to be hand cranked back up about each hour and a half. Several times a night fuel was carried by hand up the 175 steps.

The kerosene lamp was replaced with four 250 watt incandescent bulbs in the 1920s. (Note: Penberthy 2016 gives a year, 1925.) At 550,000 candlepower, it was then the most powerful lighthouse on the east coast of the United States. The electrical system was upgraded in 1932 allowing the same amount of light to be generated with three bulbs instead of four. This is about the time electric utility wires were erected in the Hillsboro area. Two 1,000 watt xenon high pressure lamps were installed in 1966, bringing the light to 5.5 megacandelas, making it the third most powerful lighthouse in the world at that time. (Note: Merinkers 1977 states a 1,000 watt quartz-iodine bulb was installed bringing the power to 2 megacandelas. Penberthy 2016 specifies a single 1,000 watt xenon bulb resulting in power of 5.5 megacandelas.) In 1977 it was the most powerful light in Florida. In the 21st century it has been claimed that the beam from the Hillsboro Inlet Light is the most powerful in the world.

Automated in 1974, the light acts both as a coastal navigational aide and as a support to local water traffic.

== Other buildings ==
The G.W. Brown Construction Company of West Palm Beach, Florida was contracted in 1905 to build the support buildings on the site, for a cost "not to exceed $21,500". Three dwellings, an oilhouse, a storehouse, a wharf, outhouses, walks and fences were built. There were three lighthouse keepers who lived with their families in the three houses. The oilhouse stored barrels of kerosene as the primary fuel for the light.

In 1977 the complex was made up of a lighthouse, light keeper's quarters, senior officer recreation quarters, shop and garage building, timer and generator building, and a barracks building. Four of these were in use by the coast guard to operate the station.

The keeper's quarters and recreational quarters are one-story wood frame vernacular buildings on brick piers. The construction is wood and clapboard. They have gabled roofs with a cross gable. One of these three homes was demolished in 2005 with plans to rebuild it in a new location. It had been bought by the Hillsboro Club in 1936, when a third lightkeeper was no longer needed, and moved 150 feet (46 m) north. The building had suffered structural damage and the club planned to erect a modern building in its location.

The barracks is a 737 square foot (68.5 m^{2}) building on a 12 in (30 cm) brick foundation with an asphalt shingle roof. It was originally used as an administration building then as quarters for the crew until 1974. The garage building is 750 square feet (70 m^{2}). It is a wood frame single story structure with a redwood shingle roof. First used as a stable by the beach patrol it later housed a government vehicle, when assigned. Both were built in 1907. The timer and generator building was built in 1942 and is 342 square feet (31.8 m^{2}).

== Restoration ==
In 1992 the big light was turned off, due to the failure of the rotating mechanism, and a smaller temporary light (a Vega 25 rotating beacon) was installed on the railing. This light was only visible for 10 nautical miles (19 km; 12 mi). The Coast Guard had planned to remove the original fresnel lens but a successful local campaign, including resolutions from the cities of Fort Lauderdale, Pompano Beach and Lauderdale-by-the-Sea, led to the restoration. The Hillsboro Lighthouse Preservation Society was co-founded in 1997 by Harry Cushing and David F. Butler as a part of the campaign. About 200 people joined the preservation society at that time. The historical value of keeping the lens in the lighthouse and the importance of the bright light as an aid to navigation were cited in the effort to persuade the Coast Guard to restore the light. The cost of the restoration was $143,000.

The old mechanism contained 400 pounds (180 kg) of mercury which was replaced by a specially designed ball bearing system. The mercury was removed in 1995 by Chemical Waste Management of Pompano Beach at a cost of $32,500. (Note: Ferrechio 2000 reported that 500 pounds (230 kg) of mercury was removed by the Coast Guard in 1992.) The lead based paint sandblasted off and epoxy paint applied by Worth Contracting of Jacksonsville, Florida the same year. The cost of this cleanup was $98,000. The large light was relit on January 28, 1999.

One month after the lamp was relit the bearing system, designed by Collins Engineering of Chicago, failed. It was redesigned by the Coast Guard Civil Engineering Unit, with sixty 2 inch (51 mm) balls in 68,000 US gallons (260,000 L) of oil. The redesigned mechanism was built by the Torrington Company of South Carolina and cost the Coast Guard $30,000. Once again on August 18, 2000, the light was turned on. As of 1999 the fresnel lens was one of nine in active use in the United States.

== Modern times ==
On June 13, 2003, the Hillsboro Inlet Light was commemorated with a 37¢ U.S. postage stamp. An art show in 2004 at the Pompano Beach civic center featured works "inspired by the lighthouse, its station keeper's dwellings, monuments, beach and flora". The Hillsboro Lighthouse Preservation Society (the preservation society) took over maintenance from the Coast Guard in 2008. The Coast Guard considered turning the light off or obscuring a portion of it to prevent guiding hatchling sea turtles away from the ocean in 2012. Also that year a bronze statue of the Barefoot mailman, James "Ed" Hamilton, was erected at the base of the lighthouse. It replaced a concrete and marble one created in 1973. The earlier sculpture stood outside the Barefoot Mailman Restaurant until it closed, moving to in front of the Hillsboro Inlet town hall and then in 2003 to the lighthouse grounds. The new bronze cost about $30,000. Both sculptures were the work of Frank Varga.

As of 2013 recreational quarters were still available for senior military officers. The Morale, Well-Being and Recreational Cottages facility consists of the Keeper's Quarters, Inlet House and The Bungalow. The Keeper's Quarters is a three-bedroom, two bath, two-story house that can accommodate 7 occupants. The first floor is compliant with the Americans with Disabilities Act of 1990. It is described by the Coast Guard as formerly the lighthouse keeper's quarters. The Inlet House is three-bedroom, two bath, two-story house. It can also accommodate 7 and is closest to the Hillsboro Inlet Waterway. Located directly behind the Inlet House is The Bungalow a 1 1/2-story, one and a half bath, one bedroom building that can accommodate 4.

On August 9, 2014, a national historic marker commemorating the Hillsboro Inlet Light Station, commissioned by the Daughters of the American Revolution was dedicated in the Hillsboro Inlet Park across the inlet from the lighthouse.

Surrounded by water on three sides and on the other by the Hillsboro Club which restricts access to its property, the lighthouse is only available to tours four times a year conducted by the preservation society via boat. In some U.S. government drug operations the lighthouse served as a vantage point. It is known locally as the "Big Diamond". Ralph Krugler the official historian of the preservation society is preparing a book on the history of the lighthouse. He intends to correct many of the inaccuracies that have been reported (he states even the list of keepers in bronze on the lighthouse isn't accurate) and relate stories uncovered in his research. The lighthouse is threatened by coastal erosion. Hurricane Irma washed a large amount of sand from under the foundations of the lighthouse and displaced the barefoot mailman statue. Half of the land the lighthouse sits on was washed away. Irma damaged the building and the site. The footings and foundation were fractured. The preservation society is raising funds for a plan to build a granite spur jetty to protect the site.

== Keepers ==
The first keeper, appointed March 3, 1907, was Alfred A. Berghell. His title was Captain of the United States Lighthouse Service. Bergell's work exceeded the expectations of a keeper, he rescued many stranded seafarers and saved numerous lives. The first assistant keepers were Henry A. Keys (First Assistant) and Robert H. Thompson (Second Assistant). In 1911 Thomas Knight became lightkeeper. His four children grew up at the station and were educated at a school there. At the time there were no established roads along the beach and it was a day-long trip to reach the nearest town, Pompano Beach about 1 mile (1.6 km) away. Knight's monthly salary was $125, the First Assistant B.F. Stone was paid $115 and the Second Assistant J.B. Isler $110. A local story is that Knight would signal his brother Eugene Knight, a rum-runner when the coast was clear.

- A.A. Berghell (1907–1911)
- T. Knight (1911–1919)
- C.F. Seabrook (1919)
- T. Knight (1919–1936
- B.F. Stone (1937–1941)
- H. Fleming (1941)
- W. Bennett (1941–1949)
- W.T. King (1949–1951)
- B.J. Williams (1951–1952)
- J.S. Childs (1952–1954)
- E.V. Bryan (1954)
- C.L. Miller (1954–1956)
- W.A. Edelkamp (1956–1957)
- F. Tucker (1957–1959)
- J.D. Evdokimoff (1959–1961)
- D.F. Thurston (1961–1963)
- F. Warren (1963–1966)
- J.D. Lloyd (1966–1968)
- J.T. Rogers (1968–1969)
- D.H. Steerman (1969–1972)
- D.W. Partridge (1972–1978)
- L.W. Jacobson (1978–1981)
- M.B. Sutton (1981–1984)
- J.S. Vosburgh (1984–1986)
- T.M. Golembeski (1986–1989)
- M.D. Helms (1989–1992)
- L. Jesse (1992–1997)
- D.L. Sparkenbaugh (1997–1998)
- R.H. Koger (1998)-
- Art Makenian (1999–2002)
