= Hillsboro Inlet =

In Pompano Beach, Florida, United States

Coordinates: 26°15′35.15″N 80°4′57.39″W

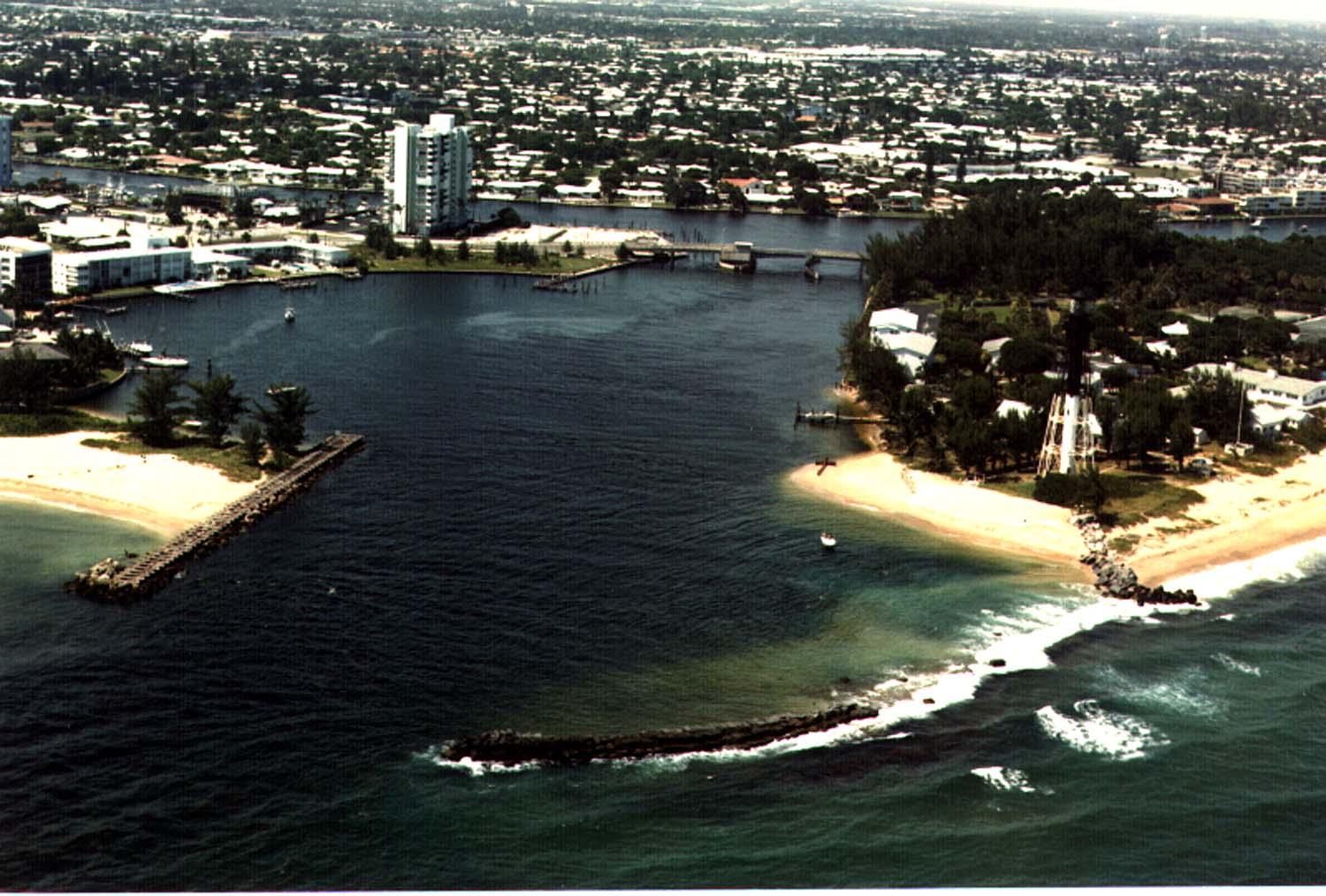
Hillsboro Inlet in Pompano Beach, Florida

Hillsboro Inlet in Pompano Beach, Florida, is an inlet from the Atlantic Ocean that connects the Atlantic to the Intracoastal Waterway.

== See also ==
- Hillsboro Inlet Light
