= Generoso (given name) =

Generoso is the given name of:

- Generoso Jiménez (1917-2007), Cuban trombone player
- Generoso Pope (1891–1950), Italian-American businessman and newspaper publisher
- Generoso Pope, Jr. (1927-1998), American newspaper publisher best known for creating The National Enquirer, son of the above
- Generoso Rossi (born 1979), Italian footballer
- General Generoso Senga, former Chief of Staff of the Armed Forces of the Philippines - see List of AFP Chiefs of Staff
