= Arrowwood =

Arrowwood may refer to:

== Plants ==
- Cornus florida, in the family Cornaceae
- Genus Viburnum in the family Adoxaceae, especially:
  - Viburnum carlesii
  - Viburnum dentatum

== Other ==
- Arrowwood, Alberta, a village in Canada
- Arrowwood National Wildlife Refuge, including Arrowwood Lake, North Dakota, United States
- Arrowood station, Charlotte, North Carolina, United States
