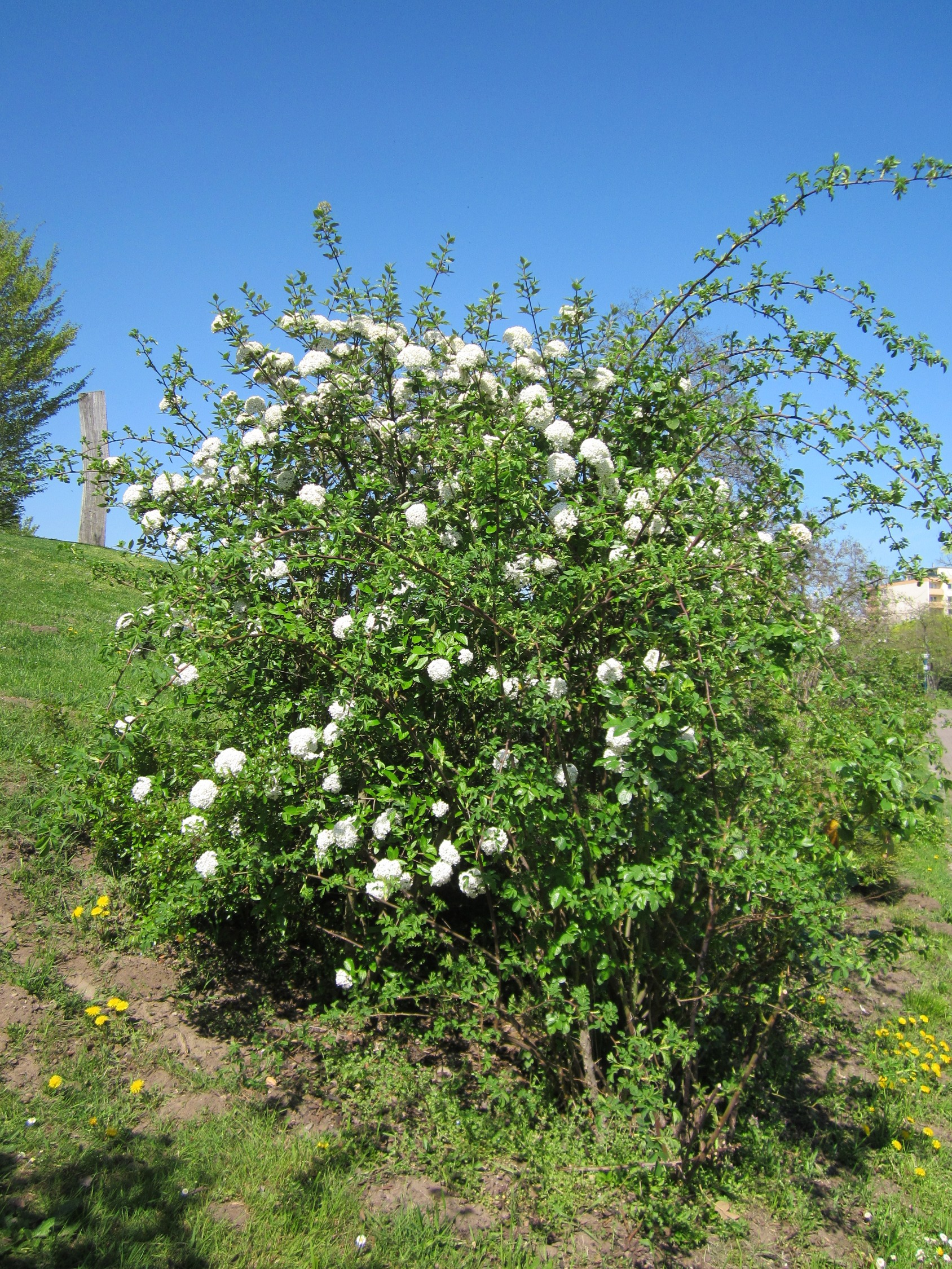
- Habit
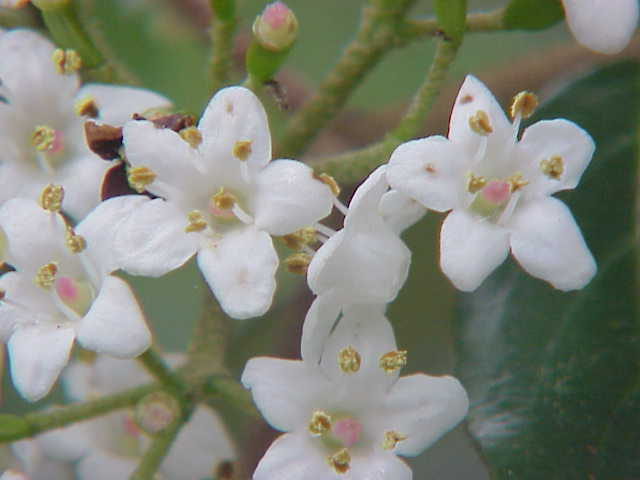
- Close-up of flowers

Scientific classification
- Kingdom: Plantae
- Clade: Tracheophytes
- Clade: Angiosperms
- Clade: Eudicots
- Clade: Asterids
- Order: Dipsacales
- Family: Adoxaceae
- Genus: Viburnum
- Species: V. utile

Binomial name
- Viburnum utile Hemsl.

Synonyms
- Viburnum bockii Graebn.; Viburnum fallax Graebn.; Viburnum utile var. minor Pamp.; Viburnum utile var. ningqiangense Y.Ren & W.Z.Di

= Viburnum utile =

Species of plant in the moschatel family

Viburnum utile, the service viburnum, is a species of flowering plant in the family Viburnaceae, native to central and southern China. A leggy evergreen shrub reaching 4 to 8 ft (1.2 to 2.4 m), it is rarely found in commerce. Instead, its chief utility has been as a parent to viburnum hybrids, including Viburnum × burkwoodii (with V. carlesii) and Viburnum × pragense (with V. rhytidophyllum). The V. × burkwoodii cultivars 'Mohawk' and 'Park Farm Hybrid', and the V. × pragense cultivar 'Pragense' have all gained the Royal Horticultural Society's Award of Garden Merit.
