= Disabled American Veterans =

Veterans' organization

- Seal
- Abbreviation: DAV
- Formation: September 25, 1920; 106 years ago
- Founder: Robert Marx
- Type: 501(c)(4) Veterans' organization
- Headquarters: Erlanger, Kentucky
- Official language: English
- National Commander: John Donovan
- National Adjutant: Barry A. Jesinoski
- Board of directors: DAV Executive Committee
- Publication: DAV Magazine
- Subsidiaries: DAV Auxiliary; DAV Auxiliary Juniors
- Website: dav.org

The Disabled American Veterans (DAV) is an organization created in 1920 by World War I veterans for disabled military veterans of the United States Armed Forces that helps them and their families through various means. It was issued a federal charter by Congress in 1932. It currently has over 1 million members.

As a 501(c)(4) social welfare organization, it is outside the purview of – and therefore not rated by – Charity Navigator. DAV's Employer Identification Number (EIN) is 31–0263158. (However, the related DAV Service Trust is a 501(c)(3) charity and is rated by Charity Navigator.) In 2024, Disabled American Veterans claimed total revenue of $176,450,766 and total assets of $654,659,108. The separate Disabled American Veterans Auxiliary (EIN 84-0505501) claimed total 2024 assets of $20,114,517 and total revenue of $1,074,763.

== History ==
In the aftermath of World War I, disabled veterans in the United States found themselves seriously disadvantaged, with little governmental support. Many of these veterans were blind, deaf, or mentally ill when they returned from the frontlines. An astonishing 204,000 Americans in uniform were wounded during the war. The idea to form the Disabled American Veterans arose at a Christmas party in 1919 hosted by Cincinnati Superior Court Judge Robert Marx, a U.S. Army Captain and World War I veteran who had been injured in the Meuse-Argonne Offensive in November 1918. Although it had been functional for some months by that time, the Disabled American Veterans of the World War (DAVWW) was officially created on September 25, 1920, at its first National Caucus, in Hamilton County Memorial Hall in Cincinnati, Ohio. While touring across the U.S. as part of the election campaign of James M. Cox, Judge Marx publicized the new organization, which quickly expanded. It held its first national convention in Detroit, Michigan on June 27, 1921, at which time Marx was appointed the first national commander. In 1922, a women's auxiliary organization was founded. The DAVWW continued working through the Great Depression to secure the welfare of disabled veterans, although their efforts were troubled by fundraising challenges and the desire of the public to put the World War behind them. In the midst of these troubled years, DAVWW was issued a federal charter by Congress, on June 17, 1932.

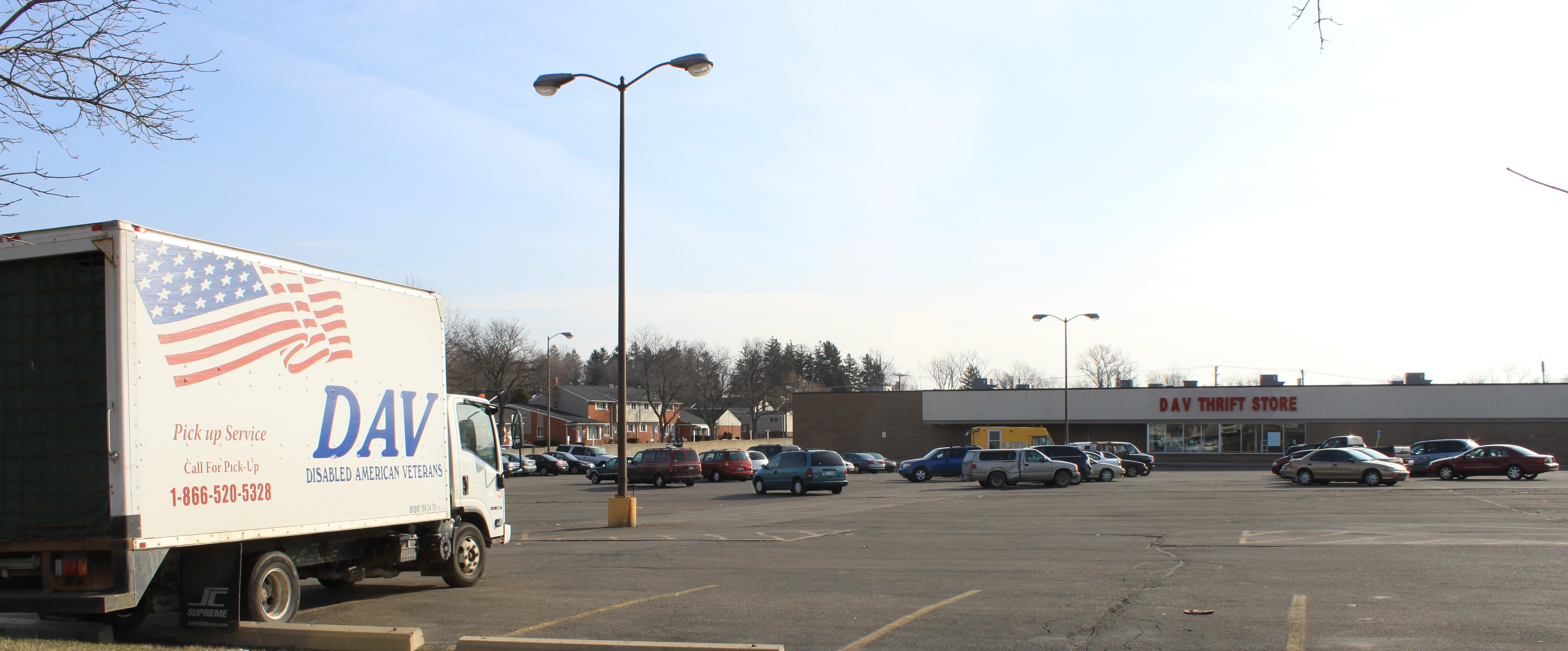
DAV Thrift Store, Westland, Michigan

The demands of World War II required the urgent expansion of the organization, which officially changed its name to Disabled American Veterans to recognize the impact of the new war. In 1941, DAV launched a direct mail campaign, distributing "IdentoTags", miniature license plates which could be attached to a keyring with instructions that lost keys should be mailed to the DAVWW, who would return them to the owners. In 1944, the DAV began offering a National Service Officer Training Program at American University in Washington, the first step of education that completed with a two-year mentorship program. In 1945, the DAV expanded the Idento Tag program and brought the manufacturing in-house, eventually purchasing complete ownership of the program in 1950. The program proved long-lasting and highly successful, both in bringing in donations and employing veterans in manufacture. By 1952, 350 people were employed in the endeavor, which brought in over $2 million a year in donations. Meanwhile, the number of disabled veterans had been increased by the still-ongoing Korean War.

The DAV suffered a decline in the later 1950s and into the 1960s, with diminishing leadership and funds, but it rallied around the veterans of the Vietnam War and also focused heavily on working for Prisoners Of War (POWs) and Missing In Action (MIAs). Vietnam veterans soon filled the diminished ranks of the National Service Officers. On Veterans Day, 1966, the DAV moved its headquarters to Cold Spring, Kentucky. The following year, the IdentoTag program was discontinued in favor of providing address labels, with a request for donation, when changes in license plate practices made continuing the IdentoTag program impracticable.

The DAV underwent substantial change in 1993, when internal arguments concerning the governance of the organization led to a watershed election that turned over the administration to new hands and the National Service Program was overhauled.

In 1998, DAV National Adjutant Arthur Wilson joined with philanthropist Lois Pope and for Secretary for Veterans Affairs Jesse Brown to push for congressional authorization of the American Veterans Disabled for Life Memorial. By the time fundraising was complete in 2010, the DAV and its affiliates had raised more than $10 million for the memorial. Dedication of the memorial took place on October 5, 2014.

DAV headquarters moved to Erlanger, Kentucky in 2021. The new headquarters is visible from the I-71/I-75 & I-275 Interstate interchanges and brings greater awareness to their free service and support for America's injured and ill veterans.

== Seal ==
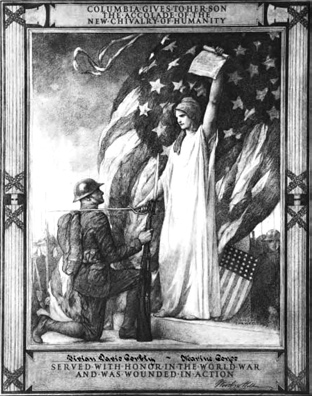
A military certificate inspired the official DAV seal.

The organization's seal has since its foundation featured a World War I soldier, armed, kneeling before Columbia, who dubs the man knight. The logo design was taken from certificates used in World War I for sick and wounded veterans. A painting by the American painter Edwin Blashfield, commissioned by the 28th President of the United States Woodrow Wilson, the certificate featured above the words "Columbia Gives to Her Son the Accolade of the New Chivalry of Humanity" and, below, the words "Served With Honor in the World War and Was Wounded in Action."

== Benefits Assistance ==
The Disabled American Veterans Organization provides service free of charge through a nationwide network of 88 DAV National Service Offices, 38 Transition Service Offices, 198 DAV Hospital Service Coordinator Offices, 52 state-level DAV Departments, 249 DAV VA Voluntary Service Representatives, and more than 1900 local DAV Chapters.

- Veteran Transition Support (VTS) service provide free assistance to servicemembers at Intake Site (Pre-Discharge Claims Assistance) locations at military installations by Disabled American Veterans Transition Service Officers (TSOs) with treatment records, filing initial claims for VA benefits and confer with the U.S. Department of Defense, the U.S. Departments of Veterans Affairs and U.S. Department of Labor facilitators and other participants in the transition process from military life to civilian life.
- Assistance completion and mailing of United States Department of Veterans Affairs VA forms on behalf of the veteran, servicemember or survivor.
- Response guidance for research and questions to veterans involving any type of disability compensation and medical services from the Veterans Health Administration (VHA) for service-connected disabilities claims.
- Response guidance to veterans, their families and survivors about the Veterans Benefits Administration (VBA), Disability Compensation, VA Pension programs, Veterans' Group Life Insurance (VGLI), Burial and Interment Allowances, Education Programs such as the Montgomery G.I. Bill and the Post-Vietnam Era Veterans Educational Assistance Program (VEAP), VA Home Loans, The Vocational Rehabilitation and Employment (VR&E) Program or other miscellaneous benefits at the VA Regional Office (VARO).
- Assistance to veterans in reopening and filing completed claims for service-connected or non-service-connected disabilities.
- Assistance for completion the VA Form for veterans that are eligible Individual Unemployability (IU) benefits.
- Assistance to veterans/survivors who are filing any type of claim (original or otherwise) for benefits, compensation and/or pension with the VA.
- Filing of Notice of Disagreement forms with the VA Regional Office for veterans.
- Assistance to veterans and/or surviving spouses to prepare and file appeals for claim denial with the VA Regional Office and the United States Court of Appeals for Veterans Claims board in Washington, D.C.
- Assistance in follow-up on status of claims filed by veterans with the VA Regional Office.
- Free review of VA denials of claim and filing of appropriate responses.
- Transportation free of charge for veterans provided by the DAV Transportation Network to ensure that wounded or ill veterans attend their medical appointments at Veterans Administration medical facilities. The DAV Transportation Network is administered by DAV Hospital Service Coordinators (HSCs).
- A free copy of the official bimonthly publication DAV Magazine.

== Outreach programs ==
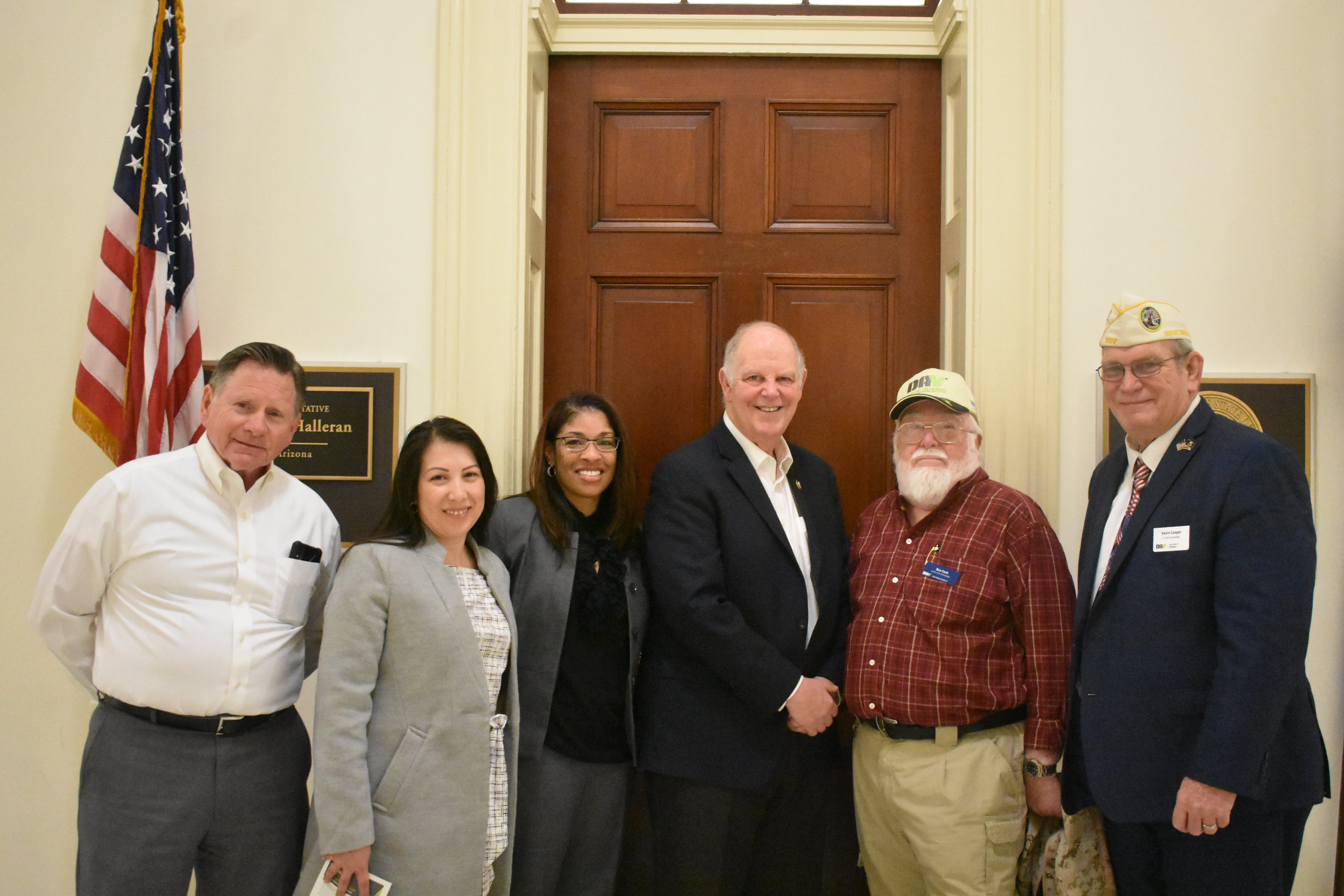
Representatives of DAV meeting with Congressmember Tom O'Halleran in 2020.

=== Mobile Service Office ===
The DAV's Mobile Service Office (MSO) Program is designed to bring assistance for disabled veterans and their families living in geographic rural areas on veterans' benefits, filing claims and services closer to home by eliminating long trips for veterans to the National Service Offices. The DAV's specially equipped Mobile Service Offices "offices on wheels" visits communities according to the MSO locations schedule. The Mobile Service Office program has been replaced by the Information Seminar Program.

=== Veterans Information Seminars ===
This outreach program is designed to educate veterans, their families and survivors who are unaware of veterans government benefits and programs, counseling and claims filing assistance service by DAV's National Service Officers (NSO) at communities throughout the country. Veterans Information Seminars are free of charge to all veterans and do not have to be a member of DAV to attend the Veterans Information Seminars. DAV's Veterans Information Seminars are held at Local DAV Chapters and Community Centers.

=== Homeless Veterans Initiative ===
DAV's Homeless Veterans Initiative promotes the development of supportive housing and critical services for homeless veterans of supportive housing and necessary services to assist become productive, self-sufficient members of society. The DAV works with Federal, state, county, and city governments to develop programs to assist homeless veterans. It also coordinates with the VA to get health care, substance abuse treatment, mental health services to put homeless veterans in transition to productive members of their community.

=== Veterans Emergency Assistance ===
The DAV Veterans Emergency Assistance may be issued for the purpose of providing: food, clothing, and temporary shelter or to obtain relief from injury, illness, or personal loss resulting from natural/national disasters that are not covered by insurance or other disaster relief agencies. Since the DAV disaster relief grants program inception in 1968, $8.7 million has been disbursed to veterans that suffered losses during natural disasters.

- The applicant must be an ill, injured or wounded veteran or the spouse thereof (same household); or a surviving spouse in receipt of Death Compensation or Dependency and Indemnity Compensation (DIC); or a surviving spouse of a former Prisoner of War (POW); or a surviving spouse of an ill, injured or wounded veteran whose life was lost in the recent disaster.
- The applicant does not need to be a member or in receipt of service connected compensation to be eligible.
- The applicant must be the victim of either an isolated or large-scale disaster.
- The applicant must be in immediate need of financial assistance, at the time of the disaster, as they do not have available funds to pay for acquired expenses. Example: Veteran is covered by homeowners insurance, but will not receive compensation from the insurance for the incident until several days out.

== DAV Auxiliary ==
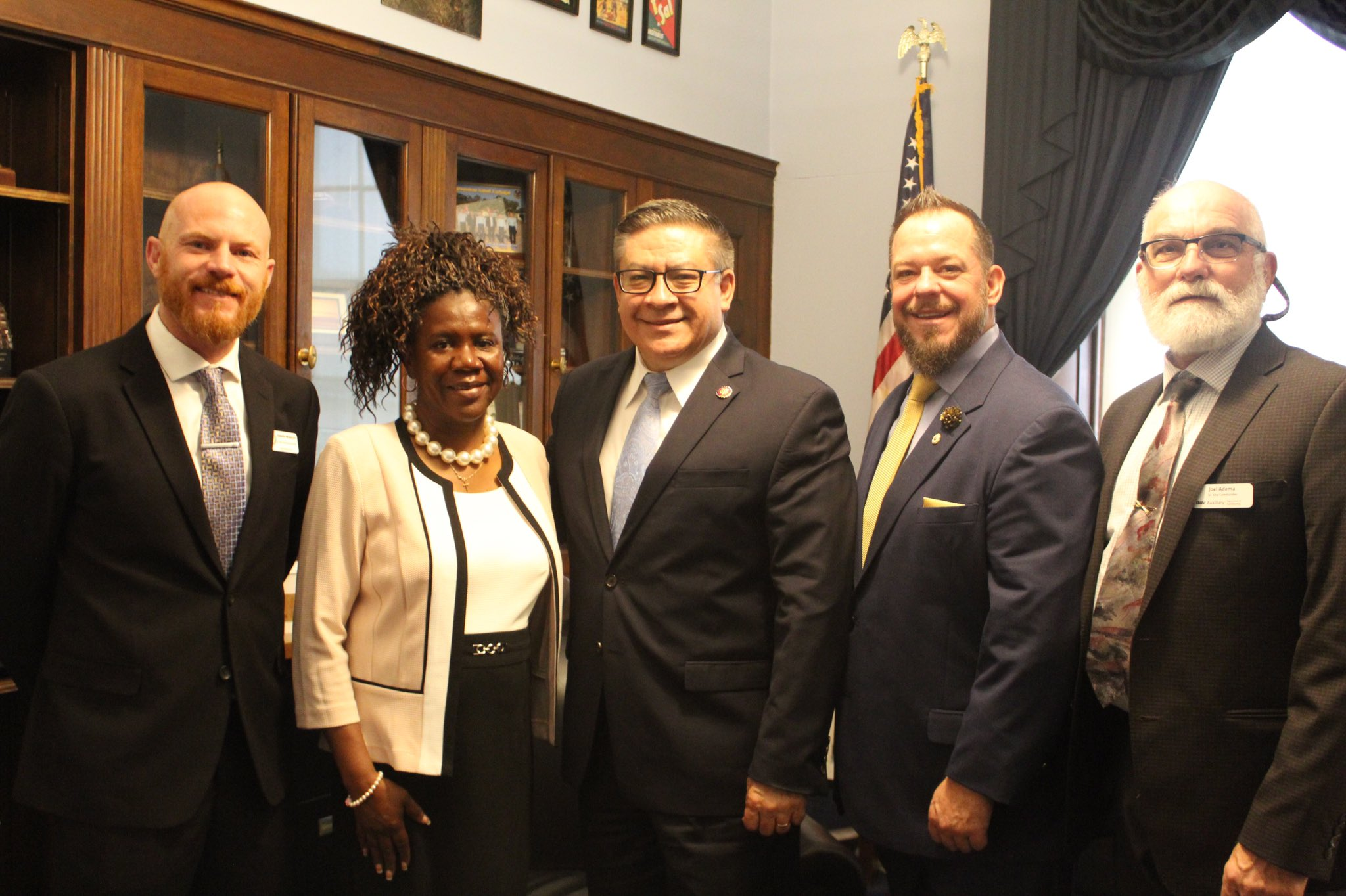
Salud Carbajal with Disabled American Veterans

The DAV Auxiliary is the sister organization of the Disabled American Veterans. Its mission statement is "Making a difference in the lives of disabled veterans and their families". Members of the DAV Auxiliary include mothers, wives, sisters, widows, daughters, stepdaughters, granddaughters and legally adopted female lineal descendants of members of the DAV. Spouses, fathers, grandfathers and legally adopted male lineal descendants of female members of the DAV are eligible for membership in the DAV Auxiliary. The family and extended family members of any person injured and may still be in active service in the United States Armed Forces and eligible for membership in the DAV Auxiliary. Members of the DAV Auxiliary actively participate in programs such as Americanism, The DAV Auxiliary may assist at Transportation Network, Veterans Information Seminars and Community Service. The DAV Auxiliary also provides volunteer assistance at Department of Veterans Affairs Medical Centers (VAMC), Outpatient Clinics (OPC), Community Based Outpatient Clinics (CBOC), VA Community Living Centers (CLC) and local DAV chapters.

=== Junior Members ===
Junior members of the DAV Auxiliary consist of boys and girls 17 years of age or under. They are eligible for membership through a family member who served in the U.S. military and was honorably discharged. The Junior members of the DAV Auxiliary can also assist activities outside of school by participating in social events at VA Medical Facilities and VA Community Living Centers, Parades, Flag Ceremonies, Welcome Home events.

== DAV Scholarship Program ==
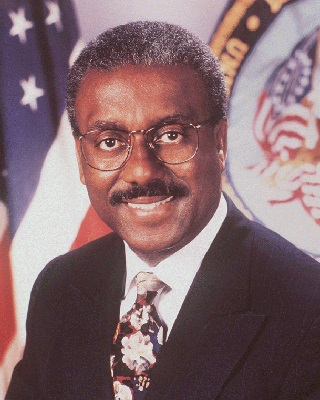
Former DAV Deputy National Service Director and United States Marine Corps Vietnam Veteran Jesse Brown

The DAV Scholarship Program (formerly named the Jesse Brown Memorial Youth Scholarship Program) honors outstanding young volunteers who are active participants in the Department of Veterans Affairs Voluntary Service programs. The scholarships are awarded to deserving young men and women who have donated their time and compassion to injured and ill veterans in their own communities.

== George H. Seal Memorial Trophy ==
This award honors the memory and accomplishments of George H. Seal, a World War II combat-injured paratrooper, who made many significant contributions during his lengthy career as a DAV National Department of Veterans Affairs Voluntary Service (VAVS) Representative and member of the VAVS National Advisory Committee. The George H. Seal Memorial Trophy, which is awarded annually by DAV in recognition of extraordinary volunteer dedication to the needs of ill and injured veterans through the VAVS Program.

== See also ==
- American Veterans Disabled for Life Memorial
- Gulf War Health Research Reform Act of 2014
- Montgomery GI Bill
- Rehabilitation Research and Development Service
- Veterans benefits for post-traumatic stress disorder in the United States
