= Curtis Chillingworth =

American judge

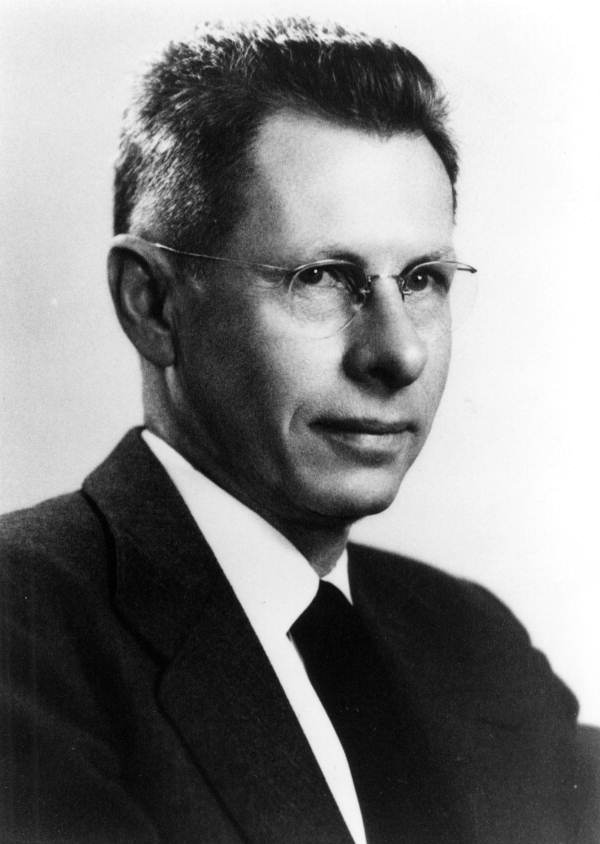
- Curtis Chillingworth, c. 1947
- Born: Curtis Eugene Chillingworth; October 24, 1896; West Palm Beach, Florida, U.S.
- Disappeared: June 15, 1955 (aged 58)
- Education: University of Florida
- Known for: Being a judge
- Spouse: Marjorie M. McKinley

Curtis Eugene Chillingworth (October 24, 1896 – June 15, 1955) was an American attorney and judge who disappeared from his home in Manalapan, Florida and was presumed murdered along with his wife, Marjorie Chillingworth.

Their disappearances and deaths are recounted in the Investigation Discovery series A Crime to Remember (Season 1 Episode 3).

== Background ==
Curtis Chillingworth was born October 24, 1896 to a prominent family in West Palm Beach, Florida. He graduated from the University of Florida in 1917, and later that same year was admitted to the Florida Bar. After graduating, Chillingworth served at the naval base in Key West, then attended the United States Naval Academy, where he received a commission to serve on the gunboat USS Annapolis. During World War I he served as an ensign aboard the USS Minneapolis.

After the war, Chillingworth returned to West Palm Beach to practice law with his father. In 1921, he began his career as county judge at age 24. He became the newly elected circuit judge in 1923, holding the position for thirty-two years until his death in 1955. He married Marjorie M. McKinley, a Cornell University student and daughter of old friends of the Chillingworth family.

Chillingworth remained in the U.S. Naval Reserves and was recalled to active duty in 1942. During World War II, he was stationed in London and Plymouth, England, where he participated in planning the occupation and recovery of Germany. He was released from active duty in 1945 as a full commander.

A 4.1-acre (17,000 m^{2}) neighborhood park in West Palm Beach is named in honor of Chillingworth.

== Disappearance ==
Chillingworth and his wife were last seen at a dinner in West Palm Beach on the evening of June 14, 1955. They left the dinner about 10 p.m. for their Manalapan home. They went to bed expecting a carpenter to arrive in the morning of June 15 to build a playground for their grandchildren.

The carpenter arrived at 8 a.m. and noticed the Chillingworths' door was left open and their home appeared to be empty. Later that same day, Chillingworth did not appear for a scheduled 10 a.m. hearing at the courthouse in West Palm Beach.

== Police investigation ==
An accidental drowning during a morning swim was quickly ruled out, and $40 found in Marjorie's pocketbook ruled out robbery. The keys were still in the ignition of Chillingworth's Plymouth automobile. No further clues were obtained and (at that point) the case went cold. The couple were declared legally dead in 1957. Several suspects were considered, including Charles Nelson, brother of Chillingworth's friend Trapper Nelson, whose trial for murder Chillingworth had presided over.

=== Judge Peel ===
In June 1955, municipal judge Joseph Peel was slated to appear in court to answer charges of unethical conduct in a divorce case, for which he faced possible disbarment. Peel had used his elected position to protect bolita operators and moonshiners by giving them advance warnings of raids in return for financial compensation. Disbarment would mean the loss of his position and therefore his lucrative illegal racket and, according to The New York Times, thwart his "scheme to become governor of Florida."

Peel had a previous run-in with Chillingworth in 1953, when the senior judge reprimanded Peel as he represented both sides in an earlier divorce case; Chillingworth warned Peel that he would get no second chance. Peel hired Floyd "Lucky" Holzapfel, a known criminal and carpenter's apprentice, to murder Chillingworth and his wife. On the night of June 14, Holzapfel and an accomplice named Bobby Lincoln went by boat to Manalapan, and landed on the beach behind the Chillingworths' house around 1 a.m. Lincoln crouched in the bushes as Holzapfel knocked on the door. The judge answered in his pajamas. Holzapfel pulled a pistol from under his shirt and forced the judge and his wife into the boat. After the boat drifted for about an hour, the couple were thrown overboard with lead weights strapped to their legs.

In 1959, Holzapfel bragged to a friend, James Yenzer, that he knew who killed the Chillingworths, and in September 1960, Yenzer and a friend, ex-West Palm Beach police officer Jim Wilber, lured Holzapfel to a hotel in Melbourne. Yenzer and Wilber managed to get Holzapfel drunk and discuss what he knew of the murders. Unbeknown to Holzapfel, a member of the Florida Sheriff's Bureau, tipped off by Yenzer and Wilber, was in an adjacent room in the hotel capturing his comments on tape.

=== Arrests and convictions ===
Holzapfel was arrested on October 1, 1960, and on December 12, he pleaded guilty to both murders. He was sent to death row, but his death sentence was commuted in 1966; he died in prison thirty years later. On March 30, 1961, Peel was found guilty of accessory to murder. He received two life sentences, but was paroled in 1982 while seriously ill with cancer, and died nine days later. Lincoln was granted immunity from prosecution in return for testifying against Peel; he later moved to Chicago after the trial.

=== Aftermath ===
Having denied his guilt, Peel delivered a deathbed confession after his release, a week before his demise, in 1982, admitting to unchecked ambition and to greedily accepting bribes from gambling bosses and moonshiners, and that Judge Chillingworth was a roadblock to his schemes, stating: "I was to go from state attorney to attorney general to governor". However, he claimed that, with regards to the murders, he was guilty only of knowing what was going to happen and failing to stop it, accusing Barney Barnett, one of his criminal contacts who had died in 1960, of being the mastermind of the crimes.

== Legacy ==
The three Chillingworth daughters, Neva, Ann, and Marie, along with Marie's spouse, Bill, started the Judge Curtis E. and Mrs. Marjorie M. Chillingworth Memorial Scholarship Fund at their own alma mater, Florida State University, in honor of their parents.

== See also ==
- List of kidnappings (1950–1959)
- List of solved missing person cases: 1950–1999
- Murder for hire
