= Manalapan, Florida =

Town in the state of Florida, United States

- Town
- Seal

- Location of Manalapan, Florida
- Coordinates: 26°33′50″N 80°00′54″W
- Country: United States
- State: Florida
- County: Palm Beach
- Settled: 1889
- Incorporated: 1931
- Named for: Manalapan Township, New Jersey

Government
  - Type: Commission-Manager
  - Mayor: John Deese
  - Vice Mayor: Simone Bonutti
  - Commissioners: Orla Imbesi, Cindy McMackin, Dwight Kulwin, David Knobel, and Mayor Pro Tem; Elliot Bonner
  - Town Manager: Eric Marmer
  - Town Clerk: Erika Petersen

Area
  - Total: 10.52 sq mi (27.25 km^{2})
  - Land: 0.45 sq mi (1.16 km^{2})
  - Water: 10.07 sq mi (26.09 km^{2})
- Elevation: 0 ft (0 m)

Population (2020)
  - Total: 419
  - Density: 937.0/sq mi (361.76/km^{2})
- Time zone: UTC-5 (Eastern (EST))
  - Summer (DST): UTC-4 (EDT)
- ZIP code: 33462
- Area codes: 561, 728
- FIPS code: 12-42700
- GNIS feature ID: 2406086
- Website: www.manalapan.org

Manalapan is a town in Palm Beach County, Florida, United States. It is part of the Miami metropolitan area of South Florida. The population was 419 at the 2020 United States census.

== History ==
United States President Benjamin Harrison granted George H. K. Carter a homestead in 1889 on the yet unnamed land. In 1931, the sparsely populated settlement was incorporated by Harold Stirling Vanderbilt as the "Town of Manalapan". He and his wife, Gertrude Conaway Vanderbilt, both lived there part-time until their deaths. A large share of the first settlers were from Manalapan, New Jersey, which resulted in the name to be selected.

One of the most puzzling mysteries in Florida history was the disappearance of Circuit Judge Curtis Chillingworth and his wife Marjorie, who left a friend's home on the night of June 14, 1955, en route to their oceanfront cottage in Manalapan. It was established five years later that the couple were murdered by hitmen hired by one of Curtis Chillingworth's fellow judges. The Chillingworths were thrown overboard from a boat into the ocean with lead weights strapped to their legs; their bodies were never recovered.

The U.S. presidential yacht Sequoia was auctioned at the La Coquille Club in Manalapan on May 18, 1977, during the Carter administration, for US$286,000 as a symbolic cutback in Federal Government spending (annual cost to the U.S. Navy was $800,000) and to reduce signs of an "imperial presidency".

A 22-acre (8.9 ha) property in Manalapan was purchased by Larry Ellison in 2022 for $173 million, making it the most expensive home sale in Florida history. The property spans A1A and is connected by a series of tunnels under the road.

In 2024, Fox News broadcaster Sean Hannity purchased a two-acre, 12,000 square-foot residence for $23.5 million dollars on the barrier island between the Atlantic Ocean and the Intracoastal Waterway.

== Geography ==
Manalapan is a small beach side community. It is bordered on the north by the bridge, beach access road and beach for the Town of Lantana, Florida; on the west by the Lake Worth Lagoon; on the south by the South Lake Worth Inlet (known locally as "Boynton Inlet"); and on the east by the Atlantic Ocean.

According to the United States Census Bureau, the town has a total area of 2.4 square miles (6.2 km^{2}), of which 0.4 square miles (1.0 km^{2}) is land and 2.0 square miles (5.2 km^{2}) (81.48%) is water.

=== Climate ===
The Town of Manalapan has a tropical climate, similar to the climate found in much of the Caribbean. It is part of the only region in the 48 contiguous states that falls under that category. More specifically, it generally has a tropical savanna climate (Köppen climate classification: Aw), bordering a tropical monsoon climate (Köppen climate classification: Am).

== Demographics ==
Historical population
Census	Pop.	Note	%±
1940	40		—
1950	54		35.0%
1960	62		14.8%
1970	205		230.6%
1980	329		60.5%
1990	312		−5.2%
2000	321		2.9%
2010	406		26.5%
2020	419		3.2%
U.S. Decennial Census

=== 2010 and 2020 census ===
Manalapan racial composition (Hispanics excluded from racial categories) (NH = Non-Hispanic)
Race	Pop 2010	Pop 2020	% 2010	% 2020
White (NH)	365	386	89.91%	92.12%
Black or African American (NH)	16	5	3.94%	1.19%
Native American or Alaska Native (NH)	0	0	0.00%	0.00%
Asian (NH)	5	11	1.23%	2.63%
Pacific Islander or Native Hawaiian (NH)	0	0	0.00%	0.00%
Some other race (NH)	0	0	0.00%	0.00%
Two or more races/Multiracial (NH)	1	1	0.25%	0.23%
Hispanic or Latino (any race)	19	16	4.68%	3.82%
Total	406	419		

As of the 2020 United States census, there were 419 people, 162 households, and 105 families residing in the town.

As of the 2010 United States census, there were 406 people, 152 households, and 104 families residing in the town.

=== 2000 census ===
As of the census of 2000, there were 321 people, 167 households, and 107 families residing in the town. The population density was 712.7 inhabitants per square mile (275.2/km^{2}). There were 271 housing units at an average density of 601.7 per square mile (232.3/km^{2}). The racial makeup of the town was 98.13% White (95% were Non-Hispanic White), 1.56% Asian, and 0.31% Pacific Islander. Hispanic or Latino residents of any race were 3.12% of the population.

As of 2000, there were 167 households, out of which 9.6% had children under the age of 18 living with them, 59.9% were married couples living together, 2.4% had a female householder with no husband present, and 35.9% were non-families. 30.5% of all households were made up of individuals, and 21.0% had someone living alone who was 65 years of age or older. The average household size was 1.92 and the average family size was 2.33.

In 2000, 7.8% of the population was under the age of 18, 2.2% was from 18 to 24, 13.4% from 25 to 44, 35.8% from 45 to 64, and 40.8% was 65 years of age or older. The median age was 61 years. For every 100 females, there were 94.5 males. For every 100 females age 18 and over, there were 91.0 males.

In 2000, the median income for a household in the town was $127,819, and the median income for a family was $117,051. Males had a median income of over $100,000 versus $36,250 for females. The per capita income for the town was $143,729. About 3.7% of families and 5.9% of the population were below the poverty line, including none of those under age 18 and 4.3% of those age 65 or over.

Those who spoke only English at home accounted for 98.54% of the population, while French was a home language of 1.45%.

== Notable people ==
- F. Lee Bailey, criminal defense attorney
- Geoff Brabham, race car driver and IMSA GTP champion
- Curtis Chillingworth, circuit Judge for Palm Beach, Florida; murdered with his wife Marjorie in 1955
- Larry Ellison, purchaser of the most expensive home in Florida
- Gloria Guinness, Mexican socialite and fashion icon, and wife of Loel Guinness
- Thomas "Loel" Guinness, member of the Guinness beer family
- Sean Hannity, television and radio political commentator
- Don King, boxing promoter
- Charles Peter McColough, former Xerox chairman and CEO
- Generoso Pope Jr., founded National Enquirer
- Lois Pope, philanthropist and widow of Generoso Pope Jr.
- Hal Prewitt, inventor of personal computer products and early pioneer in the history of personal computers
- Tony Robbins, self-help guru; relocated to Manalapan in 2013
- Gertrude Conaway Vanderbilt, socialite, philanthropist, and wife of Harold Stirling Vanderbilt
- Harold Stirling Vanderbilt, railroad executive, champion yachtsman, and member of the Vanderbilt family
- Yanni, musician; lives in oceanfront home
