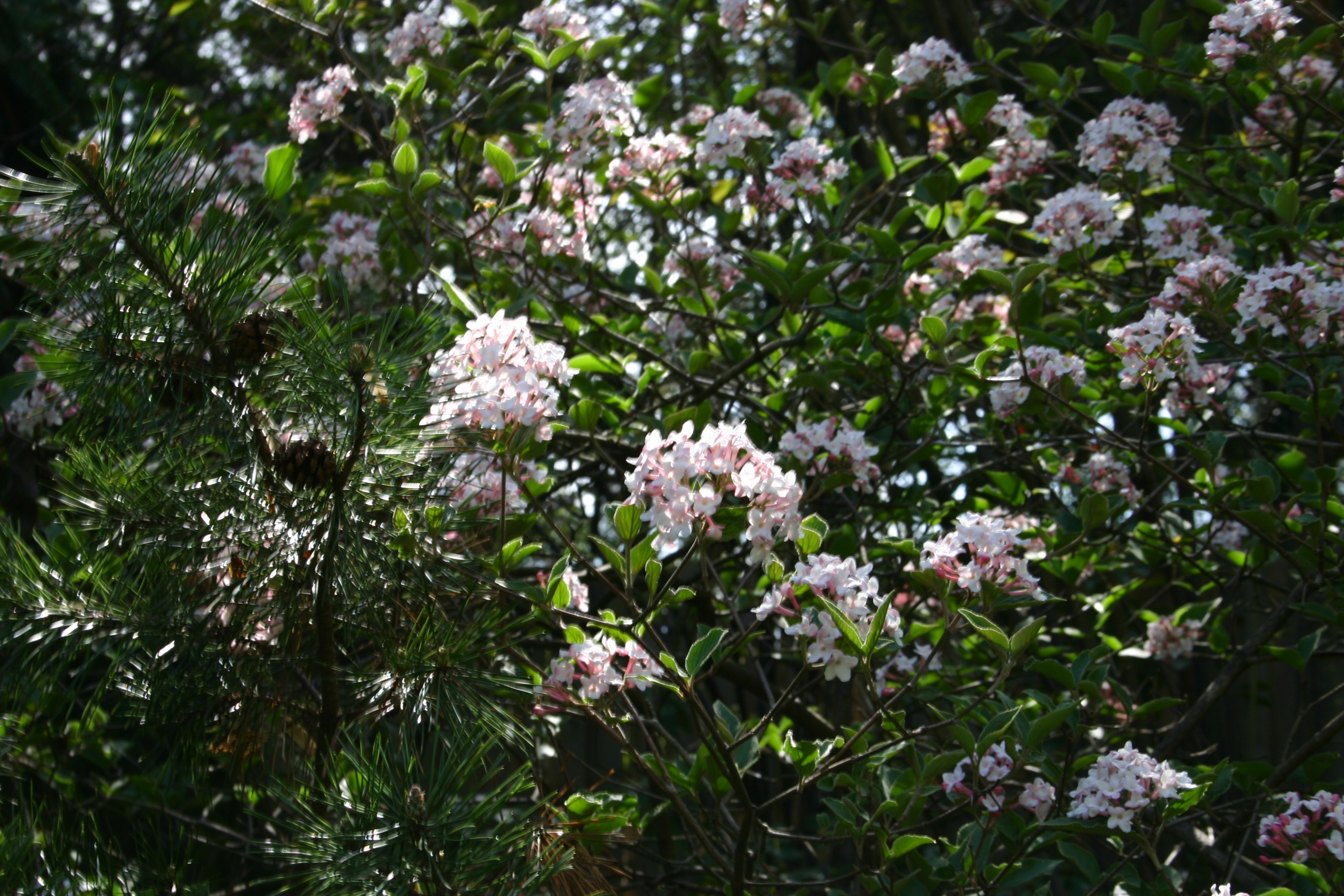

Scientific classification
- Kingdom: Plantae
- Clade: Tracheophytes
- Clade: Angiosperms
- Clade: Eudicots
- Clade: Asterids
- Order: Dipsacales
- Family: Viburnaceae
- Genus: Viburnum
- Species: V. × burkwoodii

Binomial name
- Viburnum × burkwoodii Burkwood & Skipwith

= Viburnum × burkwoodii =

Species of flowering plant

Viburnum × burkwoodii, the Burkwood viburnum, is a hybrid flowering plant in the family Adoxaceae (formerly Caprifoliaceae). It is a cross of garden origin between V. carlesii and V. utile, grown for its early, strongly scented flowers.

Growing to 2.5 m (8 ft) tall and broad, V. × burkwoodii is a deciduous shrub with glossy, dark green oval leaves on well-branching, stiff stems. The sweetly scented flowers are pinkish white, borne in spring, and followed later in the season by red fruits ripening to black.

The specific epithet burkwoodii refers to the 19th-century hybridisers Arthur and Albert Burkwood.

Numerous cultivars have been developed, of which ‘Mohawk’ and 'Park Farm Hybrid' have gained the Royal Horticultural Society's Award of Garden Merit.
