= Generoso Pope =

Newspaper publisher (1891–1950)

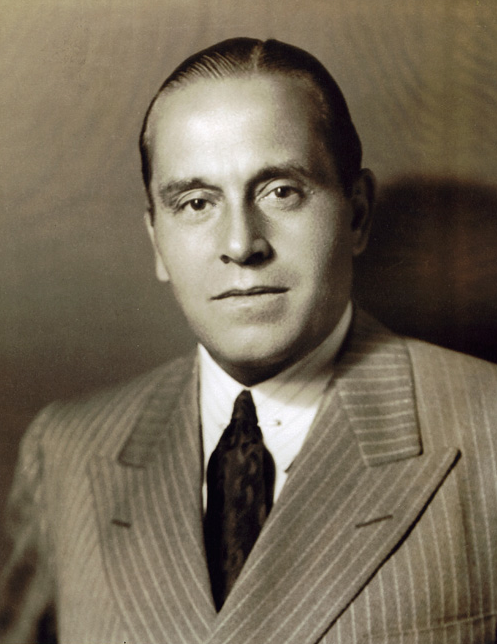
- Generoso Pope
- Born: Generoso Antonio Pompilio Carlo Papa; April 1, 1891; Arpaise, Benevento, Kingdom of Italy
- Died: April 28, 1950 (aged 59); New York City, New York, United States
- Occupation: businessman
- Spouse: Catherine Richichi (1896–1998)
- Children: 3, including Generoso Pope, Jr.

Generoso Pope (April 1, 1891 – April 28, 1950) was an Italian-American businessman and the owner of a chain of Italian-language newspapers in major American cities.

== Family ==
Generoso was born with the name Generoso Antonio Pompilio Carlo Papa. He was the son of farmers Fortunato and Fortunata Papa. His last name is an anglicized version of his birth name, "Papa" being the Italian form of address for the Pope. After coming to the United States, he fathered three sons with his wife Catherine. His eldest son, Fortunato "Fortunate", (1918–1996) graduated from Columbia University and became an executive in the family construction business. Anthony (1919–2005), who was the middle son, took over the family business and quadrupled the size of Colonial Sand and Stone Company in less than four years. Generoso Pope Jr. (1927–1988) graduated from Massachusetts Institute of Technology at age 19 and purchased what was to become the National Enquirer in 1952, two years after his father's death.

== Career ==
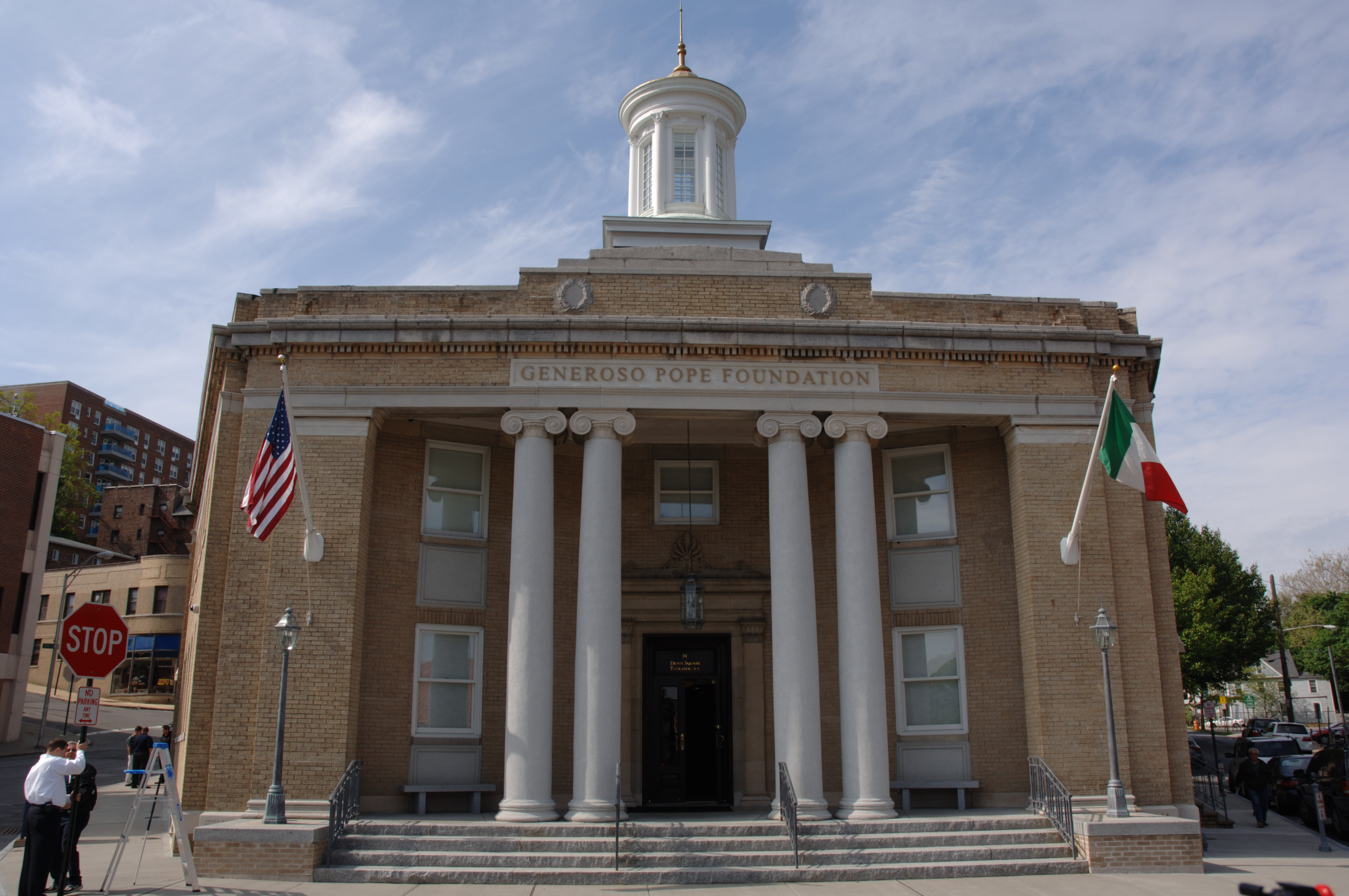
The Generoso Pope Foundation in Tuckahoe, New York

Generoso Pope arrived in the United States as Generoso Papa at age fifteen as a steerage passenger on the S/S Madonna in May 1906; he settled in New York City and found work carrying water for construction crews for $3 a week. He rose to construction supervisor and, eventually, owner of Colonial Sand & Stone, which was the largest sand and gravel company in the world.

In 1912, Pope established Pope Foods to import Italian foods. He bought the Italian-language daily newspaper Il Progresso Italo-Americano in 1928 for $2,050,000, which would convert to $261,000,000 in the modern day economy. He doubled its circulation to 200,000 in New York City, making it the largest Italian-language daily in the country. He purchased additional papers in New York, including Il Bollettino della Sera, Il Corriere d'America, and the Philadelphia daily L'Opinione. He also owned the radio station, WHOM. He became the chief source of political, social, and cultural information for the community.

A conservative Democrat who ran the Columbus Day parade and admired Mussolini, Pope was the most powerful enemy of anti-Fascism among Italian Americans. He was closely associated with Tammany Hall politics in New York, and his newspapers played a vital role in securing the Italian vote for Franklin D. Roosevelt's Democratic tickets. With his presidential friendships, Generoso was able to make Columbus Day into a national holiday in 1934. He also founded the Columbus Day Parade in New York City, which is still the world's largest Columbus Day Parade.

Pope served as chairman of the Italian Division of the Democratic National Committee in 1936, and helped persuade the president to take a neutral attitude over Italy's invasion of Ethiopia. He broke with Benito Mussolini in 1941 and enthusiastically supported the American war effort. In the late 1940s, Pope supported and helped secure the vote for William O'Dwyer as New York City mayor in 1945 and Harry S. Truman as president. His business concerns continued to prosper under New York's Democratic administrations. In the early years of the Cold War, Pope was a leading anti-Communist, orchestrating a letter writing campaign by his subscribers to stop the Communists from winning the Italian elections in 1948.

== Death ==
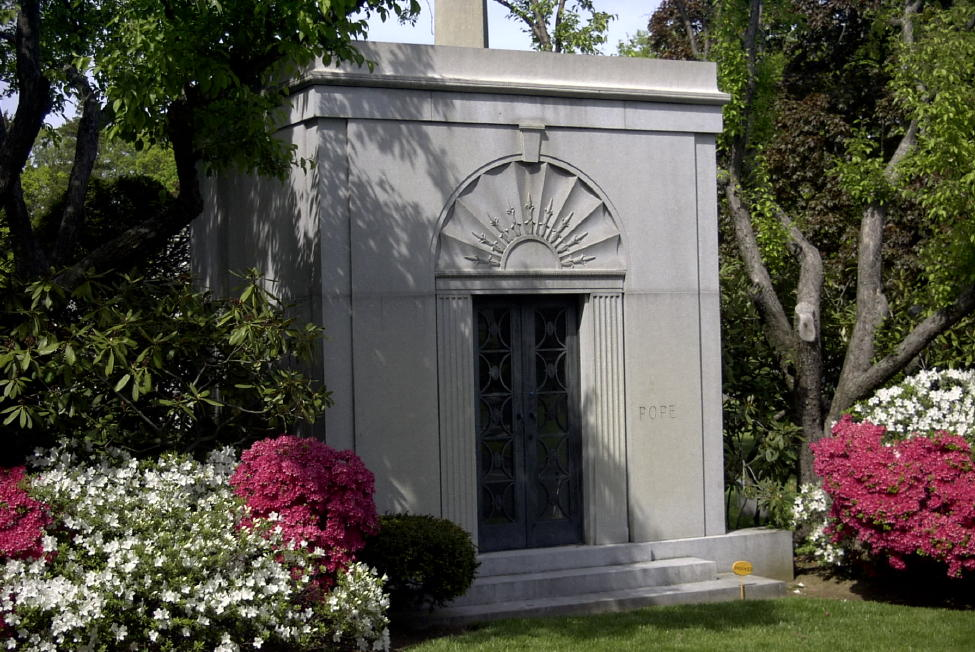
The mausoleum of Generoso Pope in Woodlawn Cemetery

Generoso Pope died of a heart ailment at age 59 in April 1950. At the time of his death, he lived at 1040 Fifth Avenue in Manhattan, the later home of Jacqueline Kennedy Onassis. Pope was interred at Woodlawn Cemetery in the Bronx, New York City, within a private mausoleum adjacent to Central Avenue, the cemetery's main road. His wife, Catherine Richichi Pope, died 48 years later in 1998 at age 101. The entire Pope family is interred at Woodlawn except for Gene, Jr., who is buried at Our Lady Queen of Peace Catholic Cemetery in Royal Palm Beach, Florida.

== Legacy ==
The St. Francis College athletics complex in Brooklyn, New York, is named after Generoso Pope. The complex houses the college's NCAA Division I teams and was erected in 1971. In addition, Pope Hall at Saint Peter's University in Jersey City, New Jersey, was dedicated to Generoso in 1971. The Generoso Pope Foundation is located in Tuckahoe, New York. There is also a dedication mural for Generoso Pope at Lawrence Hospital in Bronxville, New York.
