= Lois Pope =

American philanthropist

- Born: June 7, 1933 (age 93); Philadelphia, Pennsylvania, U.S.
- Occupation: Philanthropist
- Website: www.life-edu.org

Lois Berrodin Pope (born June 7, 1933) is an American philanthropist. She is the widow of National Enquirer founder Generoso Pope Jr.

== Early life ==
Pope was born Lois Berrodin in suburban Philadelphia. She attended, but did not graduate from, Chestnut Hill College in Philadelphia, which later presented her with an Honorary Doctor of Laws Degree in recognition of her philanthropic work. Pope later attended Fairleigh Dickinson University in New Jersey and Florida Atlantic University. Pope has an honorary doctor of humane letters degree from the Rabbinical College of America.

== Philanthropy ==
Pope established the Lois Pope LIFE Foundation and the Lois Pope LIFE Center. The Lois Pope LIFE Center is a neurological research facility that originated from Pope's contribution of $10 million to the University of Miami Miller School of Medicine. In addition, Pope has donated $12 million to the University of Miami's Bascom Palmer Eye Institute to establish a center for research into treatments for macular degeneration and retinal diseases. The new center will be called the Lois Pope Center for Retinal & Macular Degeneration Research.

Pope's organizations have sponsored a variety of charitable endeavors, including a clean-water project in Guatemala, summer camp grants for disadvantaged youths, programs to honor disabled veterans, and HealthCorps. She initiated the discussions which led to the creation of the American Veterans Disabled for Life Memorial, to which she and her foundations donated more than $10 million.

As a patron of the arts, she has supported the Florida Philharmonic Orchestra, the Palm Beach Opera and the Armory Art Center in West Palm Beach.

== Personal life ==
Pope married William Morris agent George Wood in 1959. They had two children, Maria and Michele.

She was married to Generoso Pope, Jr., who acquired the National Enquirer in 1952. In 1988, he died of a heart attack at the age of 61. About a year after his death, and according to the terms of his will, the executors of his estate put the Enquirer and its sister publications up for sale. The company was bought in a closed auction by Macfadden Publishing and Boston Ventures partnership for $412 million.

She resides in Manalapan, Florida. She has four children. One of her children with Generoso, Lorraine (born 1973), has Down syndrome and lives in a residence for developmentally-challenged individuals in Ross, California.

In May 2013, Pope's son, Paul, was arrested on a complaint of public nudity and intoxication.
