= Generoso Pope Jr. =

American businessman (1927–1988)

- Born: Generoso Paul Pope Jr. January 13, 1927
- Died: October 2, 1988 (aged 61); Manalapan, Florida, U.S.
- Occupation: Newspaper publisher
- Spouses: Patricia McManus; Edith Moore; Lois Berrodin
- Children: 4
- Parent: Generoso Pope

Generoso Paul "Gene" Pope Jr. (13 January 1927 – 2 October 1988) was an American media mogul, best known for creating The National Enquirer as it is known today.

== Early life ==
Pope was born on January 13, 1927. His father, Generoso Pope, was a New York political powerbroker and quarry magnate whose Italian-American newspaper interests included the Corriere d'America and the daily Il Progresso Italo-Americano. Generoso Pope Sr. is said to have had ties to New York crime boss Frank Costello, and at the birth of his son asked Costello to be the godfather.

Pope was educated at the Horace Mann School. He graduated from the Massachusetts Institute of Technology, where he earned at age 19 a bachelor's degree in general engineering in 1946.

== Career ==
Pope took over the daily operations of the Il Progresso Italo-Americano at the age of 21. He worked for the CIA's psychological warfare unit in 1950.

Pope acquired the New York Enquirer in 1952 for $75,000. The Enquirer purchase was supposedly made, in part, with a loan from Costello. In 1954, Pope revamped the format from a broadsheet to a tabloid, and renamed it The National Enquirer. Pope worked tirelessly throughout the 1950s and 1960s to increase the circulation of the Enquirer. In the late 50s and through to 1967, it was known for its gory and unsettling headlines and stories such as "I Cut Out Her Heart and Stomped On It" (Sept. 8, 1963, the true story of the April 1963 mutilation murder of former Olympic Skier Sonja McCaskie) & "Mom Boiled Her Baby And Ate Her" (1962). At this time the paper was sold on newsstands and in drugstores only — as the gory headlines would not have been allowed in family supermarkets, etc. Pope stated he got the idea for the format and these gory stories from seeing people congregate around auto accidents. After 1967, Pope tempered the use of gory headlines so the tabloid could be sold in more family-friendly environments such as at supermarket check-out lines, which Henry Dormann paved the way for by visiting with supermarket executives. This new sales strategy proved to be a huge boon for sales; single-copy sales of some issues (e.g. Elvis in his coffin) peaked above six million in the 1970s.

Pope moved the Enquirer from New York to Lantana, Florida, in 1971. By the time of Pope's death, his GP Group, in addition to The National Enquirer, included Weekly World News and a magazine distributor, Distribution Services Inc. It was sold in 1989 by his heirs to the company that would become American Media.

From 1971 to 1988 during the holiday season, Pope put up a large decorated Christmas tree, which towered over the corporate headquarters of the National Enquirer in Lantana and at times was considered the largest such tree in the world. This tradition was discontinued after Pope died in 1988.

== Personal life ==
Pope married his first wife, Patricia McManus, in 1951. After the birth of their son, Generoso Pope III, she fell into a deep postpartum depression and was ultimately diagnosed as schizophrenic. In 1961, Pope divorced McManus and married Edith Moore, a former model; when McManus heard the news, she committed suicide. Pope and Moore had a daughter, Gina, and divorced in 1965. That same year, he married his third wife, Lois Berrodin, and had two children, Paul (b. 1967) and Lorraine (b. 1972); he also adopted Lois' two daughters, Michele and Maria.

Rumors of Mafia connections dogged him his whole life. Pope lived in a self-designed beachfront home in Manalapan, Florida.

== Death ==
Pope suffered a heart attack at the age of 61 at his Manalapan mansion and died en route to the hospital — in an ambulance that he had donated to the town. He was interred at Our Lady Queen of Peace Catholic Cemetery in Royal Palm Beach, Florida. His widow Lois remains a well-known South Florida philanthropist, specializing in medical research, humanitarian relief, and the performing arts.
