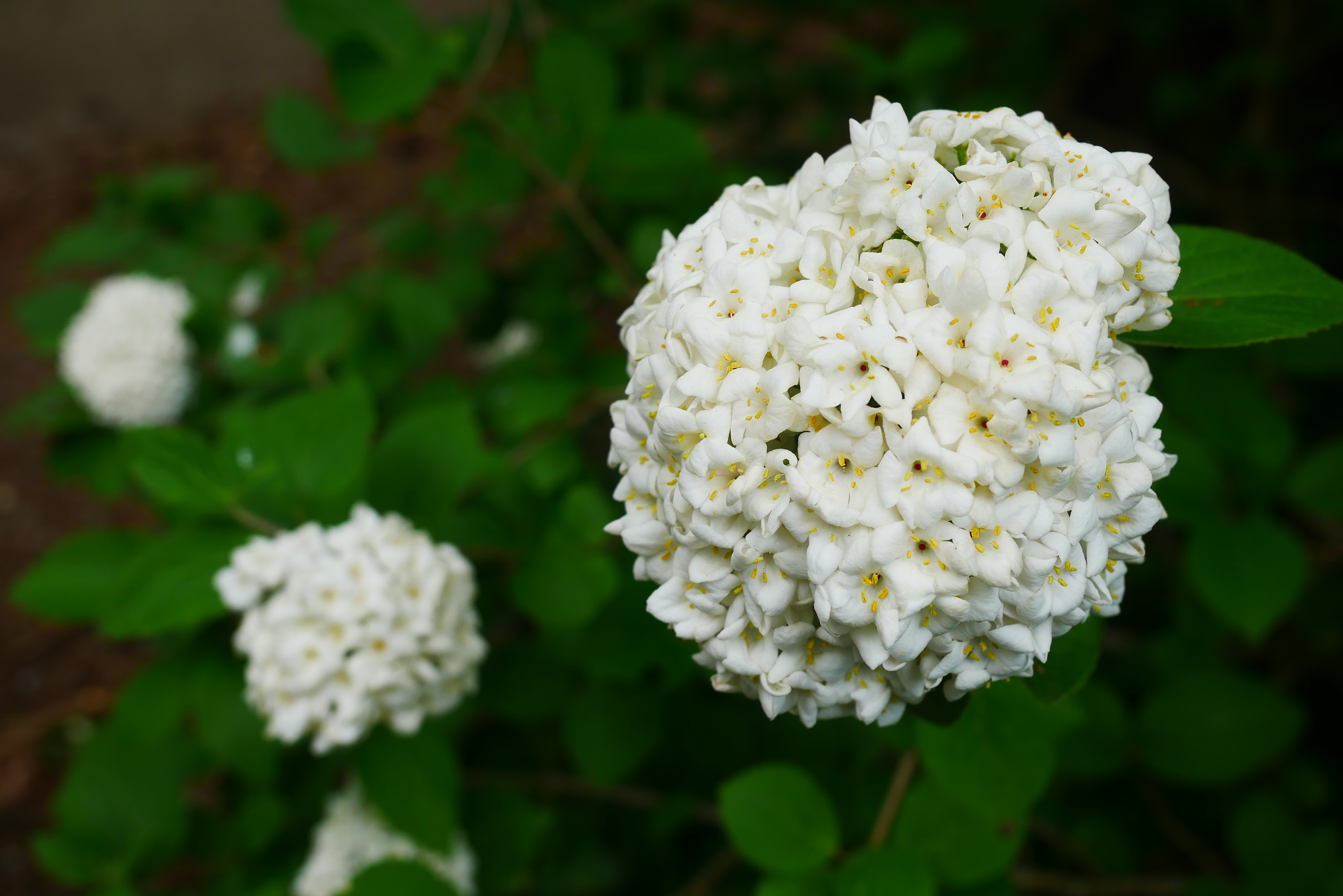

Scientific classification
- Kingdom: Plantae
- Clade: Embryophytes
- Clade: Tracheophytes
- Clade: Spermatophytes
- Clade: Angiosperms
- Clade: Eudicots
- Clade: Asterids
- Order: Dipsacales
- Family: Viburnaceae
- Genus: Viburnum
- Species: V. carlesii

Binomial name
- Viburnum carlesii Hemsl.

= Viburnum carlesii =

Species of flowering plant

Viburnum carlesii, the arrowwood or Korean spice viburnum, is a species of flowering plant in the family Adoxaceae (formerly Caprifoliaceae), native to Korea and Japan (Tsushima Island) and naturalised in Ohio, US. Growing to 2 m (7 ft) tall and broad, it is a bushy deciduous shrub with oval leaves which are copper-coloured when young. Round clusters of red buds open to strongly scented, pale pink flowers in late spring. These are followed in late summer by oval red fruits ripening to black in autumn.

The Latin specific epithet carlesii refers to William Richard Carles (1848–1929), a British plant collector in Korea.

The cultivars 'Aurora' and ‘Diana’ have gained the Royal Horticultural Society's Award of Garden Merit.

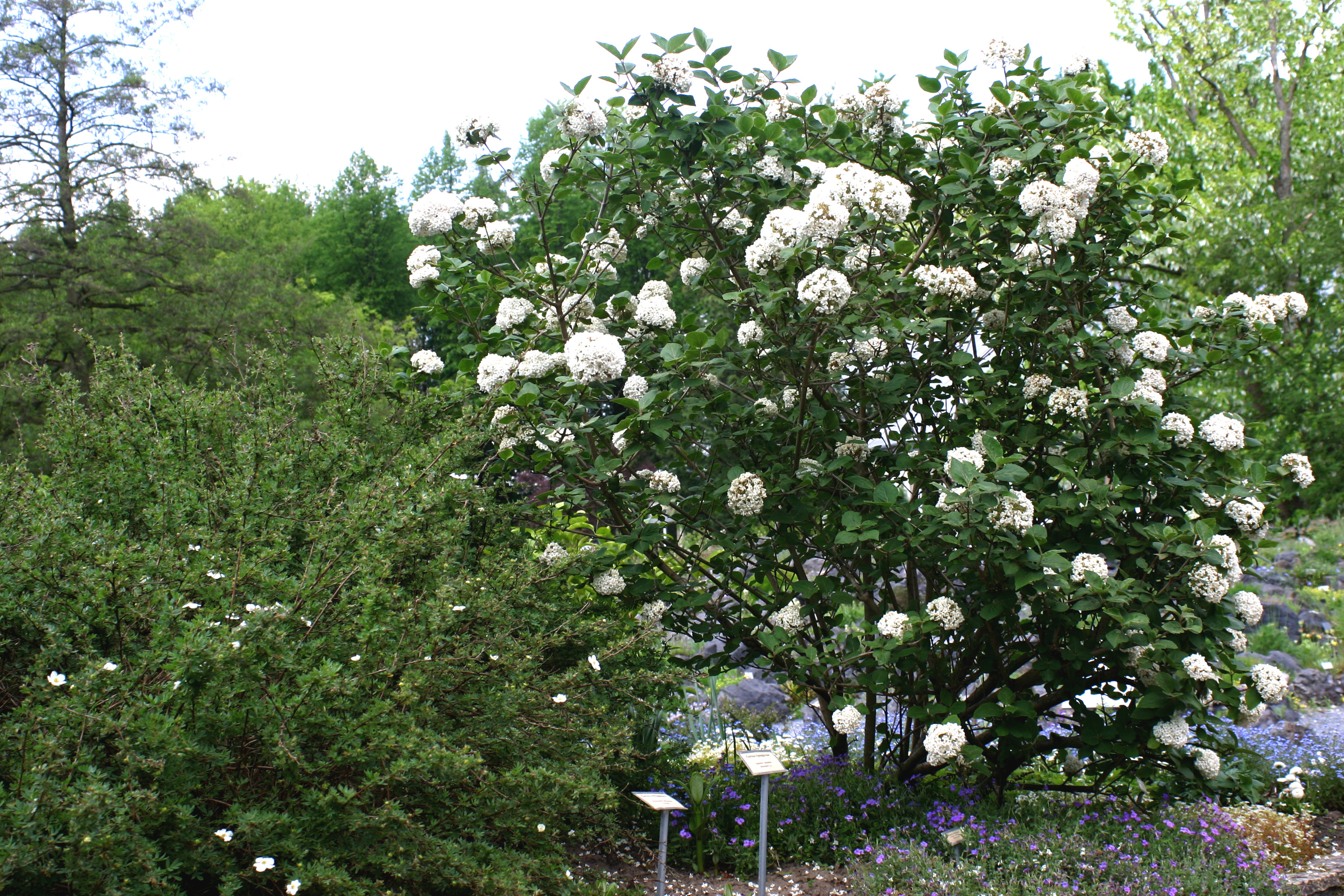
"Koreanischer Schneeball" at Botanischen Garten der Westfälischen Wilhelms-Universität Münster
