= The Kill Team =

The Kill Team may refer to:

- The Kill Team (2013 film), a documentary about the murders of at least three Afghan civilians perpetrated by a group of U.S. Army soldiers in 2010, during the War in Afghanistan
- The Kill Team (2019 film), a docudrama based on the above real-life events

== See also ==
- Maywand District murders, the event on which the films are based
