= Kill Team =

Kill Team may refer to:

== People ==
- A group of U.S. Army soldiers that perpetrated the Maywand District murders from June 2009–June 2010, during the War in Afghanistan

== Media ==
- "Kill team (demo)", a song by thrash metal band Sadus from the 2007 reissue of Illusions
- The Kill Team (2013 film), a documentary about the Maywand District murders
- The Kill Team (2019 film), a docudrama based on the Maywand District murders

== Gaming ==
- Kill Team, a miniature wargame that is based on Warhammer 40,000 but with smaller, more detailed battles.
- Warhammer 40,000: Kill Team, a 2011 top-down shooter computer game
- Warhammer 40,000: Kill Team, a 2016 expansion with rules for skirmish-level combat for the 7th edition of the Warhammer 40,000 tabletop wargame
