= Andereggen =

Andereggen is a surname. Notable people with the surname include:

- Nicolás Andereggen (born 1999), Argentine footballer
- Viviane Andereggen (born 1985), Swiss filmmaker
