= Paul Keim =

American geneticist and microbiologist

- Born: Idaho
- Education: Northern Arizona University; University of Kansas
- Known for: Work on microbiological forensics in the context of bioterrorism and public health hazards.
- Scientific career
- Fields: pathogen genomics, biodefense
- Institutions: Northern Arizona University

Paul Keim is an American distinguished professor, geneticist and microbiologist, known for his work in pathogen genomics and biodefense. He is the founding executive director of the Pathogen and Microbiome Institute (PMI) and holds the titles of E. Raymond and Ruth Reed Cowden Chair of Microbiology and Regents Professor of Biology at Northern Arizona University. He has made major contributions to the field of microbiological forensics, especially in the context of bioterrorism and public health hazards.

His publications include over 500 scientific and research policy papers, which have been cited over 60,000 times with an h-index of 116.

== Early life and education ==
Keim grew up in central Kansas and initially attended McPherson College but earned his Bachelor of Science in Biology and Chemistry from Northern Arizona University and his Ph.D. in Botany from the University of Kansas. His postdoctoral training was the University of Utah and Iowa State University in genetics and microbiology. He did sabbatical stints at Los Alamos National Laboratory, Universidad de Costa Rica, and as a Senior Research Associate at the University of Oxford.

== Career ==
Keim has been a faculty member at Northern Arizona University for over 35 years, where he holds the titles of E. Raymond and Ruth Reed Cowden Chair of Microbiology and Regents Professor of Biology. He has also founded the Pathogen Genomics Division (2003) at the Translational Genomics Research Institute (TGen) and holds the rank of Distinguish Professor.

In 2002, Keim established the Microbial Genetics and Genomics Center at NAU, which transformed into the Pathogen and Microbiome Institute (2001). His work in microbial forensic has allowed for analysis of dangerous pathogens, particularly those related to bioterrorism, such as Bacillus anthracis (anthrax), Yersinia pestis (plague), Francisella tularensis (tularemia).

== Contributions ==
Keim is most noted for his involvement in the FBI investigation of the 2001 anthrax attacks, where his lab at NAU identified the anthrax strain used in the attacks. His team developed assays that were more accurate in identifying strains than others available at the time, assisting both in the criminal investigation and the subsequent clean-up efforts. Documentation of this work includes Keim’s appearance in a 2022 Netflix documentary Anthrax Attacks.

His research also investigated the 1993 anthrax attack in Japan to the Aum Shinrikyo cult, demonstrating the forensic applications of genomic technology in biodefense.

== Pathogen genomics program ==
Keim leads the Pathogen Genomics Program, a collaboration between TGen and NAU. The program focuses on three core areas:

1. Biodefense – Enhancing forensic analysis for biological weapons.
2. Human-Pathogen Interactions – Understanding the relationship between humans and microbial pathogens to develop new diagnostics and treatments.
3. Disease Movement – Studying how pathogens spread to control and prevent future outbreaks.

His work has not only addressed bioterrorism but has also extended to public health, helping to develop molecular identification tools for pathogens like E. coli, Salmonella, Listeria, and tuberculosis.

== Research in epidemiology and disease outbreaks ==
Keim's has been involved in tracking various disease outbreaks, including the identification of the source of a cholera outbreak in Haiti after the 2010 earthquake and determining the spread of Valley fever in organ transplant cases. His efforts have contributed to a better understanding of how pathogens evolve and spread, with the goal of mitigating future public health crises.

== Selected publications ==
- Keim, P.; Smith, K. L.; Keys, C.; Takahashi, H.; Kurata, T.; Kaufmann, A. (December 2001). "Molecular investigation of the Aum Shinrikyo anthrax release in Kameido, Japan". Journal of Clinical Microbiology. 39 (12): 4566–4567. doi:10.1128/JCM.39.12.4566-4567.2001. ISSN 0095-1137. PMC 88589. PMID 11724885.
- Achtman, Mark; Morelli, Giovanna; Zhu, Peixuan; Wirth, Thierry; Diehl, Ines; Kusecek, Barica; Vogler, Amy J.; Wagner, David M.; Allender, Christopher J.; Easterday, W. Ryan; Chenal-Francisque, Viviane; Worsham, Patricia; Thomson, Nicholas R.; Parkhill, Julian; Lindler, Luther E.; Carniel, Elisabeth; Keim, Paul (21 December 2004). "Microevolution and history of the plague bacillus, Yersinia pestis". Proceedings of the National Academy of Sciences. 101 (51): 17837–17842. Bibcode:2004PNAS..10117837A. doi:10.1073/pnas.0408026101. ISSN 0027-8424. PMC 535704. PMID 15598742.
- Pearson, Talima; Busch, Joseph D.; Ravel, Jacques; Read, Timothy D.; Rhoton, Shane D.; U'Ren, Jana M.; Simonson, Tatum S.; Kachur, Sergey M.; Leadem, Rebecca R.; Cardon, Michelle L.; Van Ert, Matthew N.; Huynh, Lynn Y.; Fraser, Claire M.; Keim, Paul (14 September 2004). "Phylogenetic discovery bias in Bacillus anthracis using single-nucleotide polymorphisms from whole-genome sequencing". Proceedings of the National Academy of Sciences. 101 (37): 13536–13541. Bibcode:2004PNAS..10113536P. doi:10.1073/pnas.0403844101. ISSN 0027-8424. PMC 518758. PMID 15347815.
- Johansson, Anders; Farlow, Jason; Larsson, Pär; Dukerich, Meghan; Chambers, Elias; Byström, Mona; Fox, James; Chu, May; Forsman, Mats; Sjöstedt, Anders; Keim, Paul (September 2004). "Worldwide genetic relationships among Francisella tularensis isolates determined by multiple-locus variable-number tandem repeat analysis". Journal of Bacteriology. 186 (17): 5808–5818. doi:10.1128/JB.186.17.5808-5818.2004. ISSN 0021-9193. PMC 516809. PMID 15317786.
- Girard, Jessica M.; Wagner, David M.; Vogler, Amy J.; Keys, Christine; Allender, Christopher J.; Drickamer, Lee C.; Keim, Paul (1 June 2004). "Differential plague-transmission dynamics determine Yersinia pestis population genetic structure on local, regional, and global scales". Proceedings of the National Academy of Sciences of the United States of America. 101 (22): 8408–8413. doi:10.1073/pnas.0401561101. ISSN 0027-8424. PMC 420407. PMID 15173603.
- Keim, Paul; Van Ert, Matthew N.; Pearson, Talima; Vogler, Amy J.; Huynh, Lynn Y.; Wagner, David M. (1 September 2004). "Anthrax molecular epidemiology and forensics: using the appropriate marker for different evolutionary scales". Infection, Genetics and Evolution. 4 (3): 205–213. Bibcode:2004InfGE...4..205K. doi:10.1016/j.meegid.2004.02.005. ISSN 1567-1348. PMID 15450200.
- Keim, P.; Price, L. B.; Klevytska, A. M.; Smith, K. L.; Schupp, J. M.; Okinaka, R.; Jackson, P. J.; Hugh-Jones, M. E. (May 2000). "Multiple-locus variable-number tandem repeat analysis reveals genetic relationships within Bacillus anthracis". Journal of Bacteriology. 182 (10): 2928–2936. doi:10.1128/JB.182.10.2928-2936.2000. ISSN 0021-9193. PMC 102004. PMID 10781564.
- Keim, P.; Diers, B. W.; Olson, T. C.; Shoemaker, R. C. (November 1990). "RFLP Mapping in Soybean: Association between Marker Loci and Variation in Quantitative Traits". Genetics. 126 (3): 735–742. doi:10.1093/genetics/126.3.735. ISSN 0016-6731. PMC 1204227. PMID 1979039.
- Martinsen, G. D.; Whitham, T. G.; Turek, R. J.; Keim, P. (July 2001). "Hybrid populations selectively filter gene introgression between species". Evolution; International Journal of Organic Evolution. 55 (7): 1325–1335. doi:10.1111/j.0014-3820.2001.tb00655.x. ISSN 0014-3820. PMID 11525457.

== Awards ==
- Fellow of the American Association for the Advancement of Science. AAAS. 2015.
- Fellow of the American Academy of Microbiology 2002.
- AZBio Researcher of the Year 2012
- Honorary Doctorate in Humane Letters, Northern Arizona University 2013
