= Nine Bodies in a Mexican Morgue =

British thriller television series

- Genre: Mystery; Thriller
- Created by: Anthony Horowitz
- Written by: Anthony Horowitz
- Directed by: Brian O'Malley; Viviane Andereggen
- Starring: Eric McCormack; David Ajala; Lydia Wilson; Jan Le; Adam Long; Siobhán McSweeney; Peter Gadiot; Ólafur Darri Ólafsson; Carolina Guerra; Deborah Ayorinde; Hari Dhillon
- Opening theme: "Sweet Dreams (Are Made of This)" by Eurythmics
- Country of origin: United Kingdom
- Original language: English
- No. of series: 1
- No. of episodes: 6

Production
- Executive producers: Jill Green; Eve Gutiérrez; Anthony Horowitz; Michael Wright; Alec Strum; Wayne Garvie; Paula Cuddy
- Producer: Richard Burrell
- Cinematography: James Mather
- Editors: Adam Trotman; Nigel Bunyan; Karenjit Sahota
- Running time: 47–51 minutes
- Production companies: Eleventh Hour Films; MGM+ Studios; Sony Pictures Television

Original release
- Network: MGM+
- Release: 2 March – 6 April 2025

Nine Bodies in a Mexican Morgue is a British mystery thriller television series created and written by Anthony Horowitz. The series premiered on 2 March 2025 on MGM+.

== Premise ==
Following a plane crash in the Mexican jungle, nine bodies are recovered and brought to a local morgue. The series begins with these corpses already laid out, and the mystery centers on how each person ended up dead. Through flashbacks and shifting perspectives, the story reconstructs the events leading up to the crash and the subsequent deaths, revealing hidden connections, motives, and secrets among the passengers. As the narrative unfolds, viewers are drawn into a tense whodunit that explores not just who the killer is, but why the victims were targeted.

== Cast and characters ==
=== Main ===
- Eric McCormack as Kevin Anderson, a former doctor and medical equipment salesman
- David Ajala as Zack Ellis, an insurance investigator
- Lydia Wilson as Sonja Blair
- Jan Le as Amy Maclean, a wealthy heiress with PTSD from witnessing a school shooting
- Adam Long as Dan Maclean, Amy's husband and a former conman who worked as a driver for her family
- Siobhán McSweeney as Lisa Davies, a former hospice nurse and co-owner of a motel chain
- Peter Gadiot as Carlos García Méndez, a professional wrestler and skilled mechanic
- Ólafur Darri Ólafsson as Travis Davies, Lisa's husband
- Carolina Guerra as Cora De León
- Deborah Ayorinde as Claire Sundiata
- Hari Dhillon as David Malik

=== Supporting ===
- Isaiah St. Jean as Emilio
- Ángel López-Silva as Captain Gabriel Vega
- Sebastián Capitán Viveros as Second Lieutenant Ignacio López
- Harlys Becerra as Héctor Guzmán
- Joana Borja as Beatriz Ortega
- Christian Contreras as Octavio Fuentes
- Sebastián Orozco as Daniel Sánchez
- Daniel Topic as Frank Courtney
- Misa D'Angelo as Mariana
- Oscar Foronda as Chief Inspector Pablo Revueltas
- Gloria Garcia as Dr. Sofía Guijarro

== Episodes ==
No.	Title	Directed by	Written by	Original release date
1	"Dead Reckoning"	Brian O'Malley	Anthony Horowitz	March 2, 2025
2	"Black Angels"	Brian O'Malley	Anthony Horowitz	March 9, 2025
3	"Rapido"	Brian O'Malley	Anthony Horowitz	March 16, 2025
4	"The Short Straw"	Viviane Andereggen	Anthony Horowitz	March 23, 2025
5	"Cloud Cover"	Viviane Andereggen	Anthony Horowitz	March 30, 2025
6	"Body Bags"	Viviane Andereggen	Anthony Horowitz	April 6, 2025

== Production ==
Nine Bodies in a Mexican Morgue was originally conceived by Anthony Horowitz in 2020, developed in partnership with Blumhouse Television for the short-form streaming platform Quibi. Following Quibi’s shutdown, the project was reimagined as a six-part limited series and commissioned by MGM+.

Horowitz serves as the series’ writer, creator, and executive producer. The production is handled by Eleventh Hour Films, with Jill Green and Eve Gutierrez also executive producing alongside Horowitz.

Principal photography began in mid-2024, with filming taking place in the Canary Islands, which doubled for the Mexican jungle and desert settings.

In May 2024, the BBC joined the project as a co-broadcaster, acquiring UK rights to the series. It was announced that the show would premiere on BBC One and be available for streaming on BBC iPlayer. Sue Deeks, Head of BBC Programme Acquisition, described the series as “an ingenious, original and suspenseful murder mystery multiplied by nine.”

== Release ==
The series premiered on 2 March 2025 on MGM+ in the United States.

The series was acquired by BBC One in the United Kingdom, and premiered on 27 September 2025.
