= The Party (2026 TV series) =

British television series

- Genre: Drama
- Created by: Sarah Solemani
- Based on: The Party by Elizabeth Day
- Written by: Sarah Solemani
- Directed by: Viviane Andereggen
- Starring: Luke Evans; Sarah Solemani; Tom Cullen; Joanna Scanlan; Lydia Leonard
- Composer: Johnny Klimek
- Country of origin: United Kingdom
- Original language: English
- No. of episodes: 5

Production
- Executive producers: Luke Evans; Elizabeth Day; Sarah Solemani; Simon Heath; Laura Cotton
- Producer: Richard Burrell
- Cinematography: Tim Fleming
- Editors: Sara Jones; Karenjit Sahota
- Running time: 45–48 minutes
- Production companies: ITV Studios; World Productions; Stoic Productions

Original release
- Network: ITVX
- Release: 11 October 2026

The Party is a 2026 British television series created and written by Sarah Solemani, who also starred with Luke Evans, Joanna Scanlan, Tom Cullen and Lydia Leonard. It is based on the novel of the same name by Elizabeth Day. Produced by World Productions and ITV Studios, it was released on ITVX on 11 October 2026.

== Premise ==
Ben Fitzmaurice (Tom Cullen) and Martin Gilmour (Luke Evans), coming from different backgounds, meet at a public school, and become friends and eventually lovers. They built careers as Tory politician and political journalist respectively. The complicated dynamics of their relationship begin to unravel and finally explode at Ben's lavish birthday party.

== Cast ==
- Luke Evans as Martin Gilmour
  - Jonathan Houlston as Young Martin Gilmour
- Sarah Solemani as Lucy Farni, Martin Gilmour's wife
  - Harper Towns as Young Lucy Farni
- Tom Cullen as Benjamin "Ben" Fitzmaurice
  - Lucas Ely as Young Benjamin Fitzmaurice
- Lydia Leonard as Serena Fitzmaurice, Ben's wife
- Isabella Brownson as Phoebe Fitzmaurice
- Joanna Scanlan as Sylvia Gilmour
- Lindsay Duncan as Lady Katherine Fitzmaurice
- Douglas Hodge as Lord George Fitzmaurice
- Sam Troughton as Jarvis Conrad
- Sally Scott as Clarissa Conrad
- Sinead Matthews as Heidi Thompson
- Bally Gill as Dominic Choudhry
- Amaka Okafor as Amina Bates
- Rakie Ayola as Elinor Winner
- Andrew Havill as Howard Pierson
- Kerrie Hayes as Rachel Samuels

== Episodes ==
No.	Title	Directed by	Written by	Original release date
1	"Episode 1"	Viviane Andereggen	Sarah Solemani	11 October 2026
2	"Episode 2"	Viviane Andereggen	Sarah Solemani	11 October 2026
3	"Episode 3"	Viviane Andereggen	Sarah Solemani	11 October 2026
4	"Episode 4"	Viviane Andereggen	Sarah Solemani	11 October 2026
5	"Episode 5"	Viviane Andereggen	Sarah Solemani	11 October 2026

== Production ==
=== Development ===
The five-part series is directed by Viviane Andereggen and produced by World Productions, ITV Studios and Stoic Productions. It is written by Sarah Solemani from the novel by Elizabeth Day. Solemani and Day are executive producers alongside Luke Evans, Simon Heath and Laura Cotton. Richard Burrell is series producer.

Evans had enjoyed the book and taken the idea of adapting it to World Productions, who optioned it in 2021. The novel had previously been optioned to release by another company, but that elapsed. Day appears as a beckoning party guest in one of the opening scenes of the series. Speaking about his decision to try and get the series made, Evans said:

"It's my kind of story. I love the narrative. I love the characters. Selfishly, there was also a great leading role that I could play."

=== Casting ===
Sarah Solemani and Luke Evans also lead the cast which includes Tom Cullen, Joanna Scanlan, Lydia Leonard and Sam Troughton as well as Sally Scott, Sinéad Matthews, Bally Gill, Amaka Okafor and Rakie Ayola with Lindsay Duncan and Douglas Hodge.

=== Filming ===
Principal photography took place in Wales in October 2025. Filming locations included Cardiff and Rhondda Cynon Taf, with scenes set at Howell's School. Filming also took place at the University of Oxford at locations including Exeter College, St Hugh's College and New College. Llanharan House stands in for Denby Hall, where the eponymous party takes place.

== Release ==
All five episodes of the series was released on ITVX on 11 October 2026.
