= Bodyguard of Lies (film) =

2025 American documentary film

- Directed by: Dan Krauss
- Produced by: Alex Gibney; Ahmad Sharifi; Darryl Frank; Justin Falvey; Brad Hebert; Susan Zirinsky; Terence Wrong
- Cinematography: Brett Wiley
- Edited by: Paul Synder
- Music by: Animal Collective
- Production companies: Jigsaw Productions; Amblin Documentaries; See It Now Studios; The Washington Post
- Distributed by: Paramount+
- Release dates: June 8, 2025 (Tribeca); September 12, 2025
- Running time: 90 minutes
- Country: United States
- Languages: English; Pashto

Bodyguard of Lies is a 2025 American documentary film, directed by Dan Krauss. It follows the War in Afghanistan (2001–2021), and the deception by the government to the American public. It is inspired by the Afghanistan Papers published in The Washington Post.

It had its world premiere at Tribeca Festival on June 8, 2025, and was given a limited release on September 12, 2025, prior to streaming on Paramount+ on September 23, 2025.

== Premise ==
Explores the War in Afghanistan (2001–2021), and the deception by the government to the American public.

== Production ==
In January 2020, it was announced Amblin Entertainment and Jigsaw Productions had teamed to produce a documentary revolving around the Afghanistan Papers published in The Washington Post.

== Release ==
It had its world premiere at Tribeca Festival on June 8, 2025. It also screened at DC/DOX on June 14, 2025. It was given a limited release on September 12, 2025, prior to streaming on Paramount+ on September 23, 2025.
