= October 2026 white powder incident =

Suspicious substances mailed to American officials

In October 2026, one month ahead of the 2026 United States elections, letters containing a "white powder" considered "suspicious" were mailed to several dozen election officials and to several dozen members of Congress, of which most were Democrats. Two people were charged.

== Background ==
The 2001 anthrax attacks sent anthrax to several newspaper offices and to Senators Tom Daschle (D-MT) and Patrick Leahy (D-VT), killing 5 and injuring 17. The 2003 ricin letters sent two letters with ricin, one to the Bush White House, and one with no address, injuring none. The April 2013 ricin letters sent three letters with ricin to US officials, injuring none. These attacks led to increased fear of unmarked white powders and several anthrax hoaxes in the years that followed.

Near the November 2024 elections, letters with white powder were sent to election officials in 16 states. The powder turned out to be flour or baking soda. Near the November 2023 elections, letters with white powder were sent to election officials in Fulton County, GA (Atlanta); Lane County, OR (Eugene); and King, Spokane, Pierce, and Skagit counties in Washington (near Seattle). The letters contained trace amounts of fentanyl, which disrupted vote counting but injured zero.

== Attack ==
On October 13–16, dozens of letters containing a "suspicious substance", sent via the United States Postal Service, were identified and intercepted by the Postal Inspection Service or Capitol Police. The FBI announced an investigation on October 15 and said "over 100" suspicious letters had been sent.

Letters were sent to at least 26 state and local election officials and at least 22 members of Congress. Most offices were evacuated as a precaution, and some employees were sent to the emergency room as a precaution, but none were injured.

=== Substance ===
The letter sent to Cook County, Illinois election officials contained baking powder. Investigators found the substance to be "harmless" or "non-hazardous" in Arizona, Louisiana, Oklahoma, and Wisconsin as well as for the letters sent to Chicago Dems and Massachusetts Dems.

=== Motive ===
Some commentators suggested a motive soon after receiving the letters. On October 16, Hillary Scholten said the letters threatened a "civil war" and claimed to be from the Democratic Socialists of America (DSA). Scholten said the DSA had "allowed extremists in its movement" who "justify violence" and had "not yet addressed the attacks". On October 15, the day before, DSA told the New York Times that it "did not send these letters", and that the return address given (an office suite in Manhattan) had not been occupied by DSA "since 2013". On October 17, Scholten said "I'm glad the DSA listened and responded to my call to condemn these threats" and "We need to see this more quickly, clearly, and often from the DSA."

In November, an Oklahoma man was charged for anthrax hoax mailings in 2026 and 2024. His letters claimed to be from the "United States Traitor Elimination Army" (USTEA). UV ink on one of his 2024 letters read: "Protect Trump! Protect the election! Protect legal votes! Throw out illegal votes! That is the motive!" Many of his 2026 mailings were addressed from "DSA [address], New York, NY 10272". Documents from DSA showed that "ustea2024@gmail.com" mass-emailed DSA chapters, with the subject line "Ambush planned for November 3rd", and threats of mass arrests for "treason" in "a joint effort between the USTEA and the FBI" for any DSA members who voted in the November 3, 2026 elections. In other mailings to election administrators, the Oklahoma man wrote: "Civil war is coming on November 3rd".

=== Recipients ===
Letters were sent to election officials in several states, including Alabama, Arizona, Connecticut, Delaware, Georgia, Idaho, Illinois, Kansas, Louisiana, Maryland, Massachusetts, Minnesota, Mississippi, Nebraska, New Hampshire, North Dakota, Ohio, Oklahoma, Oregon, Pennsylvania, South Carolina, South Dakota, Tennessee, Washington, Wisconsin, and Wyoming.

Letters were sent to several Members of Congress:

- House Democrats:
  - Minority leader Hakeem Jeffries (NY‑8)
  - Gil Cisneros (CA‑31)
  - Joe Courtney (CT‑2)
  - Sarah Elfreth (MD‑3)
  - Laura Friedman (CA‑30)
  - Maxwell Frost (FL‑10)
  - Pramila Jayapal (WA‑7)
  - Robin Kelly (IL‑2)
  - Ro Khanna (CA‑17)
  - Zoe Lofgren (CA‑18)
  - Analilia Mejia (NJ‑11)
  - Rob Menendez (NJ‑8)
  - Gwen Moore (WI‑4)
  - Kelly Morrison (MN‑3)
  - Seth Moulton (MA‑6)
  - Jimmy Panetta (CA‑19)
  - Mike Quigley (IL‑5)
  - Linda Sánchez (CA‑38)
  - Jan Schakowsky (IL‑9)
  - Brad Schneider (IL‑10)
  - Hillary Scholten (MI‑3)
  - Bobby Scott (VA‑3)
  - Darren Soto (FL‑9)
  - Tom Suozzi (NY‑3)
  - Ritchie Torres (NY‑15)
  - Eugene Vindman (VA‑7)
  - Bonnie Watson Coleman (NJ‑12)
- House Independents:
  - Kevin Kiley (CA‑3) (Note: Kiley is an independent who caucuses with the Republicans.)
- Senate Democrats:
  - Minority leader Chuck Schumer (NY)
  - Richard Blumenthal (MN)
  - Lisa Blunt Rochester (DE)
  - Chris Coons (DE)
  - Kirsten Gillibrand (NY)
  - Amy Klobuchar (MN)
  - Chris Murphy (CT)
  - Alex Padilla (CA)
  - Tina Smith (MN)
- Senate Republicans:
  - Susan Collins (ME)
  - Ted Cruz (TX)
  - Pete Ricketts (NE)
  - Mike Rounds (SD)

=== Charges ===
On October 26, 2026, a 36-year-old Illinois man was charged with sending letters to four congress members in northern Illinois. According to a criminal complaint, the suspect told investigators he put salt in the envelopes because it resembled anthrax. The suspect reportedly put his return address on the four envelopes, leading to his arrest. He denied involvement in the powders sent to politicians in other states.

On November 3, 2026, an Oklahoma man was charged with sending over 700 mailings of powder, including ones sent to election officials, congress members, pollsters, news outlets, and federal law enforcement. He was also charged with additional mailings sent ahead of the 2024 elections. Officials said the powders were mostly yeast and flour.
