= Isabella Brownson =

English actress (born 1998)

- Born: Isabella Kirby Brownson; 1998 (age 27–28); Carlisle, England
- Education: Guildhall School of Music and Drama
- Years active: 2021–present

Isabella Kirby Brownson (born 1998) is an English actress. On television, she is known for her roles in the Amazon Prime series My Lady Jane (2024) and the BBC One series The Capture (2026). She also appeared in the film Napoleon (2023).

== Early life ==
Brownson is from Carlisle, Cumbria. Her mother Grace Kirby is also an actress. Brownson joined the local youth theatre company StagedRight Productions. She went on to graduate from the Guildhall School of Music and Drama in 2019 with a Bachelor of Arts (BA) in Acting.

== Career ==
Brownson made her television debut as Malcolm Shepherd's (Mark Cox) daughter Kayleigh in an episode of the 2022 Amazon Prime thriller series The Devil's Hour. In 2023, she made her feature film debut portraying Hortense de Beauharnais, daughter of Empress Joséphine, in the Ridley Scott historical epic Napoleon.

In 2024, Brownson had her first major television role portraying Lady Katherine Grey in the Amazon Prime alternate history fantasy series My Lady Jane. That same year, she appeared in the play Talking People at the Bush Theatre as Joan. Brownson joined the cast of BBC One drama The Capture for its third series as Paige Thomas.

== Filmography ==
=== Film ===
Year	Title	Role	Notes
2014	Faith Hope and Charity	Teenage Girl	Short film
2021	The Honoree	Leonore	Short film
2023	Teenage Love Forever	Girl (voice)	Short film
2023	Napoleon	Hortense de Beauharnais	

=== Television ===
Year	Title	Role	Notes
2022	The Devil's Hour	Kayleigh Shepherd	Episode: "The Half of Ourselves We Have Lost"
2024	My Lady Jane	Lady Katherine Grey	8 episodes
2026	The Capture	Paige Thomas	5 episodes (series 3)
2026	Believe Me	Nell	Episode: #1.2
2026	The Party	Phoebe Fitzmaurice	5 episodes

== Stage ==
Year	Title	Role	Notes
2024	Talking People	Joan	Bush Theatre, London
