= Open Book (radio) =

- Country of origin: United Kingdom
- Language(s): English
- Home station: BBC Radio 4
- Hosted by: Various
- Website: www.bbc.co.uk/programmes/b006qp6p

Open Book was a BBC Radio 4 book review programme. It has been presented by Humphrey Carpenter, Philippa Gregory, Nick Revell and Charlie Lee-Potter, with Mariella Frostrup as the regular presenter from 2003 until 2020. As of 2021, the show is hosted by Elizabeth Day and Johny Pitts.

The programme was broadcast on Sundays and Thursdays in the United Kingdom, except on the first Sunday of each month and is available online via BBC Sounds, as is an archive of past issues.
