= Ayaad Assaad =

American microbiologist and toxicologist

Ayaad Assaad (born 1948) is an Egyptian-American microbiologist and toxicologist. He has worked for the US Environmental Protection Agency testing pesticides since 1997.

== Biography ==
Assaad was born in Egypt and became a naturalized US citizen in 1981. He holds a Ph.D. in physiology from Iowa State University in Ames, Iowa. His wife is from Nebraska.

Assaad worked as a civilian research scientist at the US Army's Medical Research Institute for Infectious Diseases (USAMRIID), in Fort Detrick, Maryland, from 1989 to 1997. While there, he developed a ricin vaccine.

In 1991, when working at USAMRIID, Assaad filed a formal complaint against co-workers including Philip Zack and Marian Rippy for racial harassment. The USAMRIID Commander, Col. Ronald Williams, investigated and ruled in Assaad's favor, singling out Zack and Rippy for leading the so-called "Camel Club" which had anonymously sent Assaad an eight-page insulting poem. According to Salon magazine: "The Army investigation documents further revealed that the two [Zack and Rippy], both married, were also having an affair." Col. Williams wrote to Assaad: "Based upon your complaint, I directed that an informal investigation be conducted. The investigation revealed that Lieutenant Colonel Zack and Dr. Rippy had participated in discriminatory behavior. On behalf of the United States of America, the Army, and this Institute, I wish to genuinely and humbly apologize for this behavior." Both Zack and Rippy were reprimanded. Zack left USAMRIID in December 1991, Rippy left in February 1992. Assaad stayed on until March 1997. Budget cuts there led to Assaad being laid off in March 1997, for which he sued the US Army for age and ethnic discrimination.

== Anthrax attacks ==
On October 2, 2001 (three days before the first fatality from anthrax in the 2001 anthrax attacks), FBI Agent Gregory Leylegian called and asked Assaad to come in for questioning, which he did the next day. The FBI had received an anonymous letter, postmarked September 21, 2001, in which an alleged co-worker warned that Assaad might be planning a biological attack. The timing is noteworthy because anthrax-victim Robert Stevens was not admitted to a Florida hospital until October 2, and he was not diagnosed with anthrax until October 3. The first set of letters containing real anthrax were mailed on September 18.

The 212-word letter sent to the FBI was unsigned and computer-typed. It stated, in part: "Dr. Assaad is a potential biological terrorist. [...] I have worked with Dr. Assaad and I heard him say that he has a vendetta against the U.S. government and that if anything happens to him, he told his sons to carry on." According to Assaad: "The letter-writer clearly knew my entire background, my training in both chemical and biological agents, my security clearance, what floor where I work now, that I have two sons, what train I take to work, and where I live." Don Foster concluded it was sent by a female officer at Ft. Detrick.

The FBI cleared Assaad of these allegations, according to Chris Murray, an FBI spokesman (as reported in Salon): "We received an anonymous letter with certain allegations about Dr. Assaad. Our investigation has determined those allegations are unfounded. Our investigation is complete. Period."
