= Elizabeth Day =

English writer (born 1978)

Elizabeth Day (born 10 November 1978) is an English novelist, journalist and broadcaster. She was a feature writer for The Observer from 2007 to 2016, and wrote for You magazine. Day has written nine books, and is also the host of the podcast How to Fail with Elizabeth Day. She was elected a Fellow of the Royal Society of Literature in 2024.

== Early life and education ==
Day was born to Tom and Christine Day in Epsom, Surrey, England, but was raised in Northern Ireland after her father became a general surgeon at Altnagelvin Hospital in Derry. Day became interested in being a writer when she was seven and became a youth columnist for the Derry Journal at the age of 12. She attended Methodist College Belfast and Malvern St James in Worcestershire, before going on to obtain a double first in History from Queens' College, Cambridge.

== Career ==
=== Journalism ===
After graduating, Day initially intended to obtain a master's degree in journalism, but was instead offered a job for the Evening Standard on the Londoner's Diary feature by Max Hastings. Day remained at the Standard for a year before joining The Sunday Telegraph as a news reporter, initially on a three-month trial. While working for the Telegraph, Day won the Young Journalist of the Year Award at the 2004 British Press Awards. After leaving the Telegraph, Day wrote features for Elle and The Mail on Sunday.

From 2007 until 2016, Day was a feature writer for The Observer, gaining a commendation in the "Feature Writer of the Year (Broadsheet") category at the 2012 Press Awards.

=== Podcast ===
In 2018, Day began her own podcast series, How to Fail with Elizabeth Day, in which she interviews guests who discuss what their failures taught them. The first episode featured Phoebe Waller-Bridge, and subsequent interviewees have included Gloria Steinem, Kelly Holmes, Nadiya Hussain, Bernardine Evaristo, Adam Buxton and Prime Minister Andy Burnham within the first days of his premiership. The podcast won the Rising Star Award at the 2019 British Podcast Awards.

=== Books ===
Day's first novel, Scissors Paper Stone, was published in 2012 and won the Betty Trask Award for debut novels by writers under the age of 35. The book, recounting the impact of sexual abuse by a family patriarch, received mixed reviews, with Melissa Katsoulis of The Sunday Telegraph describing Day as "a thoughtful and conscientious new voice in fiction", while conversely Catherine Taylor of The Guardian stated Day's writing style "ultimately disengages the reader".

Day's second novel, Home Fires (2012), details two connected women responding to the aftermaths of the First World War and the conflict in South Sudan, respectively, as well as the impact of the ageing of loved ones. Viv Groskop in The Observer praised Day's writing and described the book as "a beautifully written novel whose quietly discomfiting tone stays with you for a long while afterwards".

Day's third novel, Paradise City (2015), received positive reviews internationally, including praise by Charles Shafaieh of The New York Times, who called the novel's depiction of life in contemporary London as a "testament" to Day's skills as a writer, in addition to a positive review by Amanda Craig in The Daily Telegraph.

Day's fourth novel, The Party (2017), was described as a "slow-burner of a literary thriller" and a "gripping page-turner" by Lucy Scholes of The Observer.

Day's fifth book and first work of non-fiction was How to Fail: Everything I've Ever Learned from Things Going Wrong, a tie-in with her podcast which was published in 2019 and received a positive review from The Sunday Times.

Day's sixth book was also a non-fiction tie-in with her podcast; Failosophy: A Handbook for When Things Go Wrong (2020), featuring lessons she had learned from her own life as well as those of her readers, listeners and podcast guests.

Day's seventh book, Magpie, which explores the issue of infertility, was released in September 2021. It was Day's fifth novel, her first work of fiction since the publication of The Party in 2017. Day explored the issue of motherhood not being possible by choice and society's perspective of failure with Dr Rangan Chatterjee on BBC Radio 2 show.

=== Television and radio ===
In 2020, Day was announced as the co-host of Sky Arts Book Club Live alongside Andi Oliver. The first series of six episodes aired that year.

In 2021, Day was announced as one of the new hosts of Open Book, Radio Four's book programme, alternating with Johny Pitts. Day hosted her first episode on 17 January.

Both her novel The Party and her memoir How to Fail are being made into TV shows, the former by World Productions and the latter by Sky.

=== Pin Drop Studio ===
Day is co-founder of the cultural organisation Pin Drop Studio, which holds regular literature salons in London and other major cities, as well as the annual Pin Drop Short Story Award in collaboration with arts institution the Royal Academy of Arts.

== Personal life ==
Day married journalist Kamal Ahmed, the Business Editor of BBC News, in December 2011. The couple separated in February 2015, and are now divorced. She dated the TV presenter Rick Edwards when both were at Cambridge University. Day's second husband is Justin Basini (b. June 1974), the CEO and co-founder of ClearScore.

She has spoken publicly about her infertility and undergoing several rounds of IVF with both of her husbands. She is now a stepmother to Basini's three children.

== Bibliography ==
=== Fiction ===
- Scissors Paper Stone (2012)
- Home Fires (2013)
- Paradise City (2015)
- The Party (2017)
- Magpie (2021)
- One of Us (2025)

=== Non-fiction ===
- How to Fail: Everything I’ve Ever Learned from Things Going Wrong (2019)
- Failosophy: A Handbook for When Things Go Wrong (2020)
- Failosophy for Teens (2023)
- Friendaholic: Confessions of a Friendship Addict (2023)
