= Adam Long (British actor) =

British actor (born 1991)

- Born: April 25, 1991 (age 35); England
- Education: Arden School of Theatre
- Occupation: Actor
- Years active: 1998–present

Adam Long (born 25 April 1991) is an English actor, perhaps best known for his appearance as Lewis Whippey in Happy Valley in 2014. He also starred in Act of Grace (2008), Waterloo Road (2009), Spike Island, The Thirteenth Tale (both 2013), Vera (2014), and The Kill Team (2019). Long is represented by the agency Curtis Brown.

== Early life and education ==
Long attended De La Salle School, St Helens.

== Career ==
In 2014, Long starred as Lewis Whippey in six episodes of the first series of Happy Valley.

From 2017 to 2020, Long appeared as Joe Bancroft in ITV1's Bancroft, lead Sarah Parish's son. In 2019, he starred as Vincent Chapman/Victor Cook in the first series of The Bay.

In 2023, Long featured as DC Andrew Laptew in the ITV1 drama series, The Long Shadow, based on the five-year manhunt for the serial killer Peter Sutcliffe, commonly referred to as the Yorkshire Ripper. In 2024, he appeared as Capt Bernard DeMarco in Masters of the Air. Long recently appeared as Dan in the television series Nine Bodies in a Mexican Morgue.

== Filmography ==
=== Film ===
Year	Title	Role
2008	Act of Grace	Young Joey
2009	History of Made Up Things	Sleeper
2013	The Thirteenth Tale	Ambrose Proctor
2013	Spike Island	Little Gaz (Garreth Barrett)
2017	Dunkirk	Sub-Lieutenant Jeffries
2018	Peterloo	Wroe's printer
2019	The Kill Team	Rayburn
2019	The Corrupted	Warren Byford
2021	Cherry	Staff Sgt. Greene
TBA	The Amazing World of Gumball: The Movie!	Mr. Small (shared with Adam Long)

=== Television ===
Year	Title	Role	Notes
1998	Unnatural Acts	Various Characters	
2009	Waterloo Road	Colin Hastings	Episode #4.13
2010, 2013	Moving On	Sam / Hugh Penrose	2 episodes
2013	Vera	Kyle	Episode: "Poster Child"
2013	The Thirteenth Tale	Ambrose Proctor	Television film
2014	Father Brown	Alfred Tatton	Episode: "The Grim Reaper"
2014	Happy Valley	Lewis Whippey	6 episodes
2014	The Passing Bells	Anthony	5 episodes
2015	Home Fires	Jack Heaton	3 episodes
2015	Don't Take My Baby	Tom	Television film
2017	When the Streetlights Go On	Casper Tatum	Episode: "Pilot"
2017–2020	Bancroft	Joe Bancroft	7 episodes
2019	The Bay	Vincent Chapman	6 episodes
2020	Strike	Raff Chiswell	4 episodes
2021	Wolfe	Steve	6 episodes
2023	The Long Shadow	DC Andrew Laptew	4 episodes
2023	Platform 7	Luke Warren	Episode #1.2
2024	Masters of the Air	Capt. Benny DeMarco	7 episodes
2025	Nine Bodies in a Mexican Morgue	Dan Maclean	Main role
2025	Protection	Patrick Ellis	2 episodes
2025	Film Club	Josh	6 episodes

=== Video games ===
Year	Title	Role
2015	Need for Speed	Spike
