= Anthrax hoaxes =

Terroristic hoax involving white powder

Anthrax hoaxes involving the use of white powder or labels to falsely suggest the use of anthrax are frequently reported in the United States and globally. Hoaxes have increased following the 2001 anthrax attacks, after which no genuine anthrax attacks have occurred. The FBI and U.S. postal inspectors have responded to thousands of "white powder events" and targets have included government offices, US embassies, banks and news organizations.

== History ==
Anthrax hoaxes were sporadically reported in the 1990s, including a petri dish in an envelope labeled "anthrachs"[sic] sent to B'nai B'rith in Washington in 1997 that contained harmless Bacillus cereus, but a spate of anthrax threats followed the 1998 arrest of Larry Wayne Harris, a microbiologist and white supremacist. Harris released what he said was military-grade anthrax but was actually a harmless vaccine strain, but news coverage popularized the idea of anthrax among hoaxers. In response to these hoaxes, the CDC released guidance for public health authorities for handling bioterrorism threats.

=== Post-2001 ===
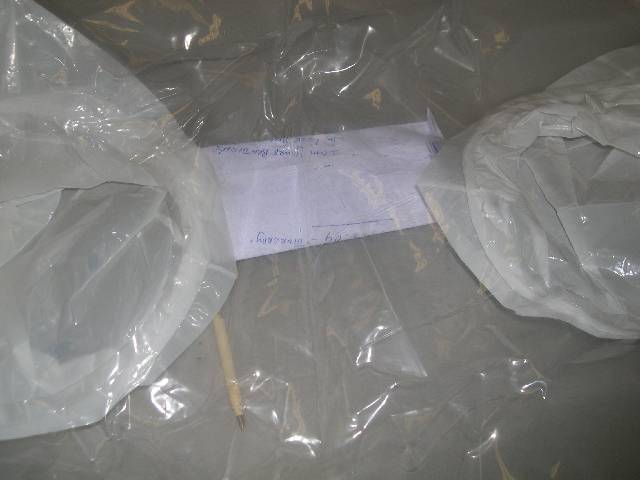
Suspect letter with white powder that was dealt with by Rhode Island Department of Environmental Management emergency responders. It was a hoax.

In the month following the 2001 anthrax attacks, hundreds of hoaxes were reported worldwide. Legislation was enacted in the UK in October 2001 so that anyone convicted of a hoax involving threats of biological, chemical, nuclear or radioactive contamination would face a seven-year prison sentence. The Anti-Hoax Terrorism Act 2001 was passed by the US House of Representatives but never enacted, and legislation making terrorism hoaxes a federal offence was finally passed as part of the Intelligence Reform and Terrorism Prevention Act of 2004.

In 2023, 2024, and 2026, several individuals sent white powder (mostly salt or yeast) to election officials and members of Congress, notably including the October 2026 white powder incident.

== Cases ==
One of the most prolific hoaxers was Clayton Waagner, an anti-abortion activist who mailed hundreds of anthrax hoax letters to abortion clinics in late 2001 and who was convicted in December 2003. A Sacramento man, Marc M. Keyser, admitted to sending around 120 packages marked as containing anthrax in October 2008, which he says was to highlight the lack of preparedness of the U.S. Department of Homeland Security and public for an anthrax attack. He was convicted in September 2009 of five counts of hoaxes and making threats and sentenced to four years in prison in late April 2010.

In November 2008, white powder was mailed to temples of the Church of Jesus Christ of Latter-day Saints in Los Angeles and Salt Lake City, causing both to be closed temporarily while the mailings were investigated. There was speculation the mailings were in protest of the church's support for Proposition 8.

Notable recipients of anthrax hoax letters include journalist Judith Miller, author of Germs: Biological Weapons and America's Secret War, who received one at the New York Times offices in October 2001.

== See also ==
- October 2026 white powder incident
