= The Anthrax Attacks: In the Shadow of 9/11 =

- Directed by: Dan Krauss
- Written by: Dan Krauss
- Produced by: BBC Studios Productions
- Starring: Clark Gregg
- Edited by: Duncan Hill
- Music by: Justin Melland
- Distributed by: Netflix
- Release date: 8 September 2022

The Anthrax Attacks: In the Shadow of 9/11 is a 2022 documentary written and directed by Dan Krauss and produced by BBC Studios Productions about the 2001 anthrax attacks.

== Synopsis ==
The Anthrax Attacks is about the 2001 anthrax attacks and the ensuing FBI investigations into it.

In a biological attack that started one week after the September 11 attacks, five people were killed and at least 17 people were injured.

== Style ==
The film utilises quasi-documentary techniques and tells its story using a combination of archival footage, dramatic re-enaction, and interviews with FBI investigators, scientists, survivors, others who were affected by the case.

Clark Gregg starred in the film as Bruce Edwards Ivins, the microbiologist and vaccinologist who became central to the case. According to a title card in the film, Gregg's dialogues are taken directly from Ivins's emails.

== Production and release ==
The documentary was produced by BBC Studios Productions and BBC Studios Science Unit. The executive producers are Andrew Cohen and Dan Krauss.

The film was released by Netflix at 8 September 2022.

== Reception ==
Jack Seale at The Guardian praised the film for "throw[ing] up plenty of rage-worthy injustices and tantalising mysteries", but also criticised it for not highlighting how the US government used the attacks to bolster support for the Iraq War.

== See also ==
- Anthrax War, a 2009 documentary about the same subject
