= Dan Krauss =

American documentary filmmaker

- Education: M.J. UC Berkeley Graduate School of Journalism
- Occupations: Film director Cinematographer

Dan Krauss is an American film director and cinematographer.

== Biography ==
Krauss is best known for his two Oscar-nominated documentary films The Death of Kevin Carter (2005), and Extremis (2016) in the Academy Award for Best Documentary (Short Subject) category at the 78th and 89th Academy Awards respectively. In 2014, Krauss directed the feature documentary, The Kill Team, winner of the Independent Spirit Awards' Truer than Fiction Award and Grand Jury Prize at the Tribeca Film Festival. Krauss graduated with a M.J. from the UC Berkeley Graduate School of Journalism.

== Filmography ==
- Inequality for All (2013)
- The Kill Team(2014)
- The Death of Kevin Carter (2005)
- Nova (2007–2016)
- O.J.: Made in America (2016)
- Extremis (2016)
- 5B (2018)
- The Kill Team (2019)
- The Anthrax Attacks: In the Shadow of 9/11 (2022)
- Bodyguard of Lies (2025)
