= The Kill Team (2013 film) =

- Film poster
- Directed by: Dan Krauss
- Produced by: Linda Davis; Julie Goldman; Deborah Hoffmann; Dan Krauss
- Cinematography: Dan Krauss
- Edited by: Lawrence Lerew
- Music by: Justin Melland
- Production companies: F/8 Filmworks; Motto Pictures; Cinereach; ITVS
- Distributed by: Oscilloscope Pictures
- Release dates: April 26, 2013 (Tribeca Film Festival); July 25, 2014 (United States)
- Running time: 79 minutes
- Country: United States
- Language: English

The Kill Team is a 2013 American documentary film directed by Dan Krauss about the Maywand District murders during the War in Afghanistan. The film won first place in the category of Best Documentary Feature at the 2013 Tribeca Film Festival.

Krauss later wrote and directed The Kill Team (2019), a narrative drama film about the murders.
