= The Kill Team (2019 film) =

2019 American war drama film

- Theatrical release poster
- Directed by: Dan Krauss
- Written by: Dan Krauss
- Produced by: Marty Bowen; Wyck Godfrey; Adrian Guerra; Isaac Klausner
- Starring: Nat Wolff; Adam Long; Anacletus Sanga; Brian "Sene" Marc; Osy Ikhile; Anna Francolini; Rob Morrow; Alexander Skarsgård
- Cinematography: Stéphane Fontaine
- Edited by: Luke Doolan; Franklin Peterson
- Music by: Zacarías M. de la Riva
- Production companies: Nostromo Pictures; Temple Hill Entertainment
- Distributed by: A24
- Release dates: April 27, 2019 (Tribeca); October 25, 2019 (United States)
- Running time: 87 minutes
- Country: United States
- Language: English
- Box office: $415,772

The Kill Team is a 2019 American war drama film written and directed by Dan Krauss. It is a fictionalized adaptation of the Maywand District murders, which were also explored by Krauss's 2013 documentary of the same name. It stars Alexander Skarsgård, Nat Wolff, Rob Morrow, Adam Long, Jonathan Whitesell, Brian Marc, Osy Ikhile, and Anna Francolini. The film follows a young U.S. Army recruit (Wolff) who becomes conflicted with his morals when his platoon, under his superior, Sergeant Deeks (Skarsgård), participates in murdering civilians in Afghanistan.

It had its world premiere at the Tribeca Film Festival on April 27, 2019, and was released theatrically and streaming on October 25, 2019, by A24.

== Plot ==
Andrew Briggman is serving in the U.S. Army in Afghanistan in 2009. When Staff Sergeant Wallace is killed in an IED explosion during a raid on a village, Staff Sergeant Deeks replaces him as platoon leader and tells his men they'll find whoever was responsible for the deaths of 24 American soldiers. Briggman provides him with a list of IED attacks by date and location. Bravo Company captures a wounded man suspected of planting an IED on the road, and Briggman refuses Deeks' order to hurt him. The platoon embarks on a series of raids on civilian villages. On the first raid, Briggman hears a gunshot and finds a boy dead on the ground. The platoon claims he tried to attack them with a grenade, but Briggman is skeptical and, on return to base, sends a message to his father about the killing. His father calls the Criminal Investigation Division (CID) to investigate Deeks for murder. Briggman is summoned to a tent with the rest of the platoon. Deeks assaults Marquez, accusing him of reporting the death to the CID. Marquez is hospitalized, and Briggman asks his father to stop calling CID.

On the second raid, Briggman's disillusionment grows when he witnesses Rayburn execute an unarmed man and plant an AK-47 on him. He again sends a message to his father detailing what he saw, then enters Deeks' office to locate a bag of enemy weapons. Deeks catches him, and Briggman says the unarmed man didn't deserve to die. Deeks believes the villagers are "co-operators" of the Jihadists and warns Briggman he's aware of his actions against him. Briggman phones his father and breaks down in tears while describing the dangerous position that he is in.

On the third raid, the team is ambushed and captures an elderly civilian who remains silent. Deeks orders Rayburn and Briggman to execute the man and throws a grenade in front of him to make it appear he tried to attack them with it. Briggman, for the first time in his combat service, pulls the trigger and kills the man.

The platoon celebrates the action back at base, but Briggman is traumatized. Rayburn has been summoned by CID for questioning about the murders, and Briggman learns he will be next. Feeling guilty for his actions, Briggman contemplates committing suicide in Deeks' office but cannot bring himself to do it. Briggman and Deeks are questioned by the CID. Accompanied by his parents, Briggman is invited to tell everything he knows.

The closing credits reveal that in 2010, five U.S. Army soldiers were charged for the murder of the civilians; Specialist Adam Winfield (depicted as Briggman in the film) pleaded guilty to involuntary manslaughter and was sentenced to three years. He gave testimony against Staff Sergeant Gibbs (called Deeks in the film), who was sentenced to life imprisonment.

== Cast ==
- Nat Wolff as Andrew Briggman
- Alexander Skarsgård as Sergeant Deeks
- Adam Long as Rayburn
- Jonathan Whitesell as Coombs
- Brian "Sene" Marc as Marquez
- Rob Morrow as William Briggman
- Osy Ikhile as Weppler
- Anna Francolini as Laura Briggman
- Oliver Ritchie as Cappy
- Tunji Kasim as Sergeant Wallace
- Taz Skylar as Sergeant Dawes

== Production ==
In October 2016, it was announced Nat Wolff and Alexander Skarsgård had joined the cast of the film, with Dan Krauss directing from a screenplay he wrote. Marty Bowen and Wyck Godfrey will serve as producers on the film under their Temple Hill Entertainment banner. In September 2017, Rob Morrow joined the cast of the film. In November 2017, it was announced Adam Long, Jonathan Whitesell, and Brian Marc joined the cast of the film.

Filming took place in Fuerteventura, one of the Canary Islands.

== Release ==
In November 2018, A24 acquired distribution rights to the film. It had its world premiere at the Tribeca Film Festival on April 27, 2019. It was released on October 25, 2019.

== Reception ==
=== Box office ===
As of December 17, 2020, The Kill Team has grossed $415,772 worldwide.

=== Critical response ===
On review aggregator Rotten Tomatoes, the film holds an approval rating of 69% based on 49 reviews, with an average rating of 6.8/10. The website's critical consensus reads, "Flawed yet viscerally effective, The Kill Team interrogates battlefield morality with a hard-hitting intensity further amplified by a talented cast." On Metacritic, the film has a weighted average score of 60 out of 100, based on 14 critics, indicating "mixed or average reviews".
