= Maywand District murders =

2010 murders of Afghan civilians by U.S. Army soldiers

- Part of the War in Afghanistan
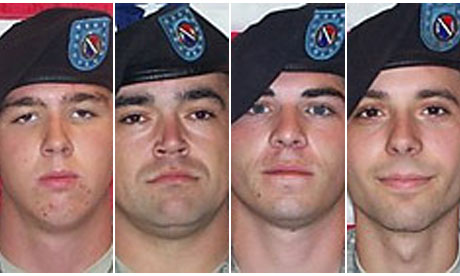
- (L to R): Andrew Holmes, Michael Wagnon, Jeremy Morlock, and Adam Winfield – members of the Kill Team soldiers who are responsible for the murders.
- Location: Maiwand District, Kandahar Province, Afghanistan
- Date: January–May 2010
- Target: Afghan civilians
- Attack type: War crime, staged murder, serial killings, human trophy collecting, terrorism
- Weapons: M4 carbines, M249 light machine guns, grenades
- Deaths: At least 3 Afghan civilians
- Perpetrators: Jeremy Morlock; Calvin Gibbs; Andrew Holmes; Adam C. Winfield
- Motive: Thrill
- Convictions: Gibbs and Morlock: Premeditated murder (3 counts); Holmes: Unpremeditated murder (3 counts); Winfield: Involuntary manslaughter
- Sentence: Gibbs: Life imprisonment with the possibility of parole after 20 years Morlock: 24 years in prison Holmes: 7 years in prison (paroled after 4 years); Winfield: 3 years in prison (paroled after 1 year)

The Maywand District murders were the thrill killings of at least three Afghan civilians perpetrated by a group of U.S. Army soldiers from January to May 2010, during the War in Afghanistan. The soldiers, who referred to themselves as the "Kill Team", were members of the 3rd Platoon, Bravo Company, 2nd Battalion, 1st Infantry Regiment, and 5th Brigade, 2nd Infantry Division. They were based at FOB Ramrod in Maiwand, in Kandahar Province of Afghanistan.

During the summer of 2010, the military charged five members of the platoon with the murders of three Afghan civilians in Kandahar Province and collecting their body parts as trophies. In addition, seven soldiers were charged with crimes such as hashish use, impeding an investigation, and attacking the whistleblower Private first class Justin Stoner.

In March 2011, U.S. Army Specialist Jeremy Morlock pleaded guilty to three counts of premeditated murder. He told the court that he had helped to kill unarmed native Afghans in faked combat situations. Under a plea deal, Morlock received 24 years in prison for murdering three Afghan civilians in return for testimony against other soldiers. Staff Sergeant Calvin Gibbs, the highest-ranking soldier and the ringleader, was also convicted on three counts of premeditated murder and sentenced to life in prison. Private First Class Andrew Holmes pleaded guilty to murder without premeditation and was sentenced to seven years in prison. Specialist Adam C. Winfield, who informed his father after the first murder and whose father attempted to alert the Army, pleaded guilty to manslaughter and was sentenced to three years in prison. In total, eleven of the twelve soldiers charged were convicted of crimes. All charges against the twelfth soldier, Specialist Michael Wagnon, were dropped by the U.S. military "in the interest of justice" without further explanation. PFC Justin Stoner, who initiated the case by reporting the murders to his superiors, was not charged.

== Killings ==
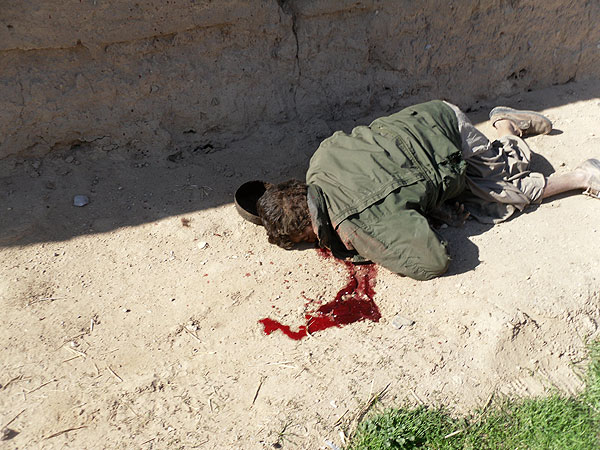
15-year-old Gul Mudin, killed by U.S. Army SPC Jeremy Morlock and PFC Andrew Holmes on January 15, 2010.

All three of the staged killings of Afghan civilians occurred in the Maywand District of Afghanistan:

- On January 15, 2010, in the village of La Mohammad Kalay, fifteen-year-old Gul Mudin was doing farm work for his father. He was unarmed. Under the direction of Staff Sergeant Calvin Gibbs, SPC Jeremy Morlock and PFC Andrew Holmes killed Mudin "by means of throwing a fragmentary grenade at him and shooting him with a machine gun and an assault rifle". The soldiers then stripped the boy and took photos with his body. They cut off the boy's little finger and left his body on the ground half-naked.
- On February 22, using thermal imagery, the soldiers discovered Marach Agha curled in a ball by a roadside. The soldiers killed him and kept part of his skull as a trophy. Morlock pleaded guilty for his death. The Army later said it believed Marach Agha to be deaf or mentally disabled.
- In the village of Kari Kheyl, Gibbs "shot at close range an unarmed man", the third victim.
- On May 2, 2010, Gibbs, Morlock, and SPC Adam Winfield attacked and killed Mullah Adahdad with a grenade and gunfire in front of the man's wife and children. Gibbs amputated and kept the man's finger. Three days after Adahdad was murdered, members of a Stryker platoon returned to his village. Tribal elders had complained to Army officers that the cleric had been unarmed and that the shooting was a setup. "This guy was shot because he took an aggressive action against coalition forces," Lt. Stefan Moye, the platoon leader, explained to village residents in Qualaday. "We didn't just [expletive] come over here and just shoot him randomly. And we don't do that." This conversation was recorded by embedded photojournalist Max Becherer, who at the time primarily freelanced for The New York Times.

== Photos and trophies of killings ==
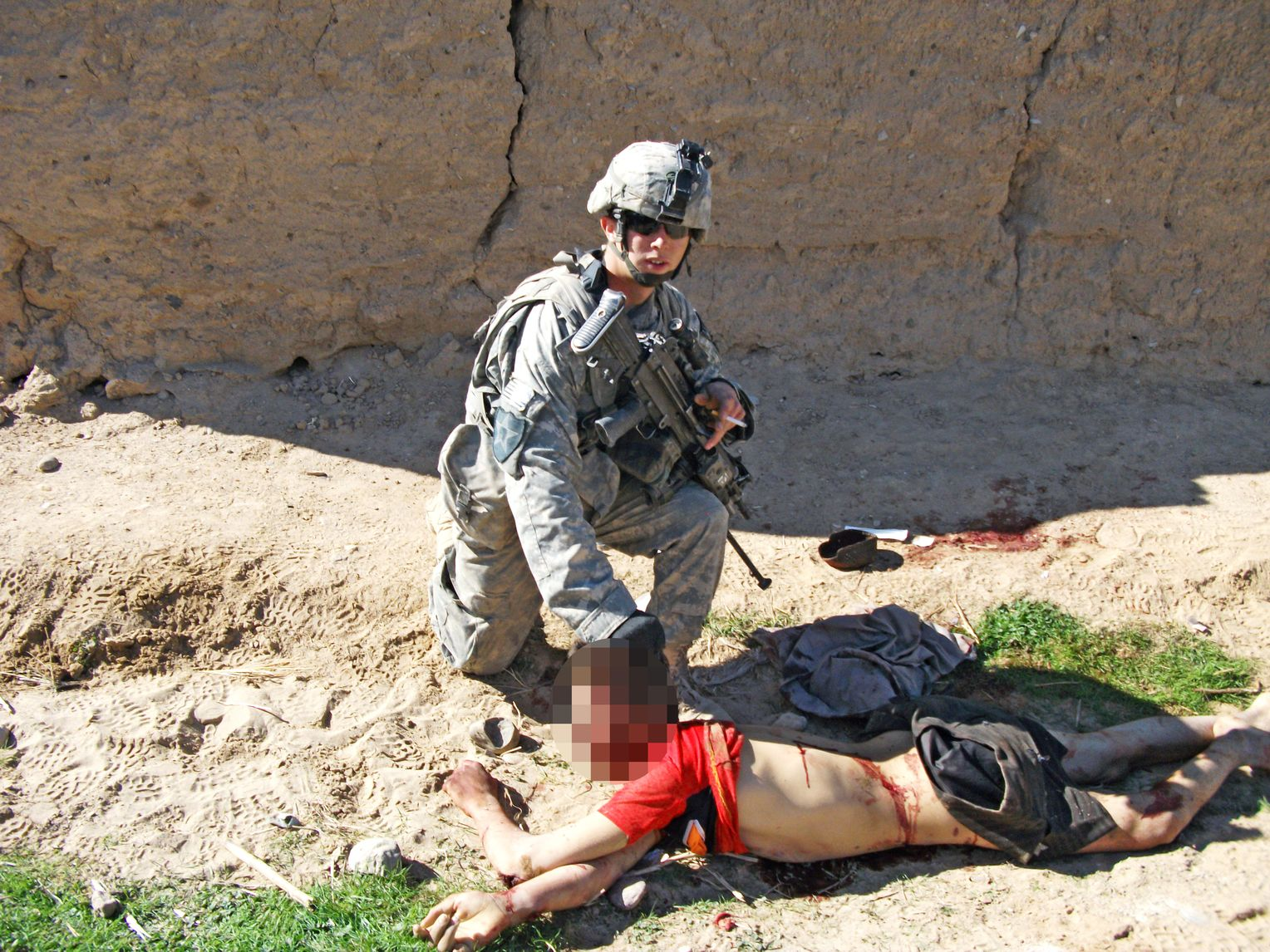
Andrew Holmes poses with the body of Gul Mudin immediately after the boy was killed.

Der Spiegel published three photos of U.S. soldiers posing with the bodies of Afghans they had killed. One of the photos shows SPC Jeremy Morlock next to one of them. He appears to be smiling and raising the head of a corpse by the hair. Other images published later in Rolling Stone include one of two unidentified Afghans cuffed together around a milestone and wearing a cardboard handwritten sign made out of an MRE package box that read "Talibans are Dead". Other photos were taken of mutilated body parts, among them one of a head being maneuvered with a stick. In Kabul, senior officials at NATO's International Security Assistance Force have compared the pictures published to the images of U.S. soldiers abusing prisoners in Abu Ghraib in Iraq.

Gibbs used medical shears to sever several fingers that he kept as a form of human trophy collecting. He gave one of them to Holmes, who kept it dried in a Ziploc bag.

== Legal proceedings ==
Five of the Army soldiers faced murder charges while seven others were charged with participating in a coverup.

=== Staff Sergeant David Bram ===
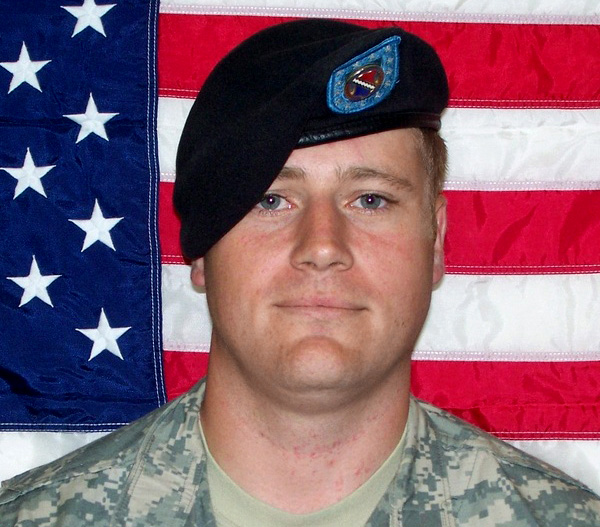
Private (then-Staff Sergeant) David Bram of Vacaville, California

David Bram from Vacaville, California was charged with conspiracy to commit assault and battery, unlawfully striking another soldier, violating a lawful order, dereliction of duty, cruelty and maltreatment, and endeavoring to impede an investigation. In May 2011, additional charges were filed against Bram, including solicitation to commit premeditated murder, aggravated assault on Afghan civilians, planting evidence, and unlawfully discussing murder scenarios with subordinates. He was convicted by an enlisted panel sitting as a general court-martial of conspiracy to commit assault and battery, failure to obey a general order, dereliction of duty, maltreatment of a subordinate, assault consummated by battery, obstruction of justice, and solicitation of another to commit murder. Bram was sentenced to 5 years in prison, reduced in rank to Private, and dishonorably discharged. The U.S. Army Court of Criminal Appeals affirmed the conviction and sentence, and the Court of Appeals for the Armed Forces denied review. Bram has since been released from prison.

=== Staff Sergeant Calvin Gibbs ===
The Kill Team ringleader, Staff Sergeant Calvin Gibbs, from Billings, Montana, was the highest-ranking soldier in the case. He was charged with conspiracy and three counts of premeditated murder for plotting to kill three Afghan civilians and then murdering them.

A report in The Guardian said that soldiers told the Army's Criminal Investigation Command (CID) that Gibbs bragged of his exploits while serving in the Iraq War, saying how easily one could "toss a grenade at someone and kill them." Prosecutors said Gibbs was found in possession of "finger bones, leg bones and a tooth taken from Afghan corpses".

Gibbs was convicted by a military jury on 15 counts, including the premeditated murder of Mudin, Agha, and Adahdad as well as illegally cutting off pieces of their corpses and planting weapons to make the men appear to be Taliban fighters. In November 2011, Gibbs was sentenced to life in prison with the possibility of parole after 9 years, reduced in rank to Private, ordered to forfeit all pay and allowances, and dishonorably discharged. He expressed regret for human trophy collecting but not for the killings in which he participated, claiming that all were justified. In January 2020, Gibbs filed a lawsuit to have his conviction vacated.

=== Private First Class Andrew Holmes ===
Andrew Holmes's attorneys argued they were constrained in defending him by the Army's decision to conceal photos of the man he had allegedly shot in January. The National Institute of Military Justice argued that the gruesome corpse photos should be made public.

Holmes has also said Morlock threatened his life if he told anyone that the killing of Gul Mudin was staged and unnecessary. A doctor testified at Holmes's trial that there were no machine gun wounds on the victim that prosecutors said was shot by Holmes's machine gun. Another soldier testified that the body was riddled with wounds and that it appeared to him that it was Holmes's weapon that killed Mudin.

In September 2011, Holmes pleaded guilty to unpremeditated murder and illegal drug use, and was sentenced to 7 years in prison. At his sentencing, he apologized and called Gibbs "a psychopath". He was released from prison on October 25, 2015.

=== Sergeant Darren Jones ===
Jones, of Pomona, California, faced charges that he beat up another soldier and fired at Afghan civilians who did not pose a threat to him. He was sentenced to seven months in prison for assault and reduced in rank to Private.

=== Specialist Adam Kelly ===
Kelly, of Montesano, Washington, was convicted of conspiring to harm SPC Justin Stoner. He was sentenced to 60 days of hard labor and given a bad conduct discharge.

=== Private First Class Ashton A. Moore ===
PFC Moore, of Severna Park, Maryland, faced the fewest charges among the group. Moore pleaded guilty to using hashish during the deployment. He was demoted to private and had to forfeit half a month's pay.

=== Specialist Corey Moore ===
SPC Corey Moore, of Redondo Beach, California, pleaded guilty to illegal drug use, assault for kicking a witness, and desecrating a corpse for stabbing a body. He was sentenced to 60 days of hard labor and given a bad conduct discharge.

=== Specialist Jeremy N. Morlock ===
Jeremy Morlock, a 22-year-old Army specialist from Wasilla, Alaska, was sentenced to 24 years in prison, reduced in rank to Private, and dishonorably discharged after pleading guilty to three counts of premeditated murder, conspiracy, obstruction of justice, and illegal drug use. He agreed to testify against the other soldiers allegedly involved. During his hearing, he was asked by Judge Lieutenant Colonel Kwasi Hawks "Were you going to shoot at (civilians) to scare them and it got out of hand?". Morlock replied: "The plan was to kill people, sir". Morlock challenged his guilty plea, but the Army Court of Criminal Appeals affirmed the conviction and sentence.

Morlock's mother accused the U.S. government of scapegoating him: "I think the government is just playing these guys as scapegoats. The leaders dropped the ball. Who was watching over all this?" she said in a Seattle Times interview.

=== Specialist Emmitt Quintal ===
Quintal was given a bad-conduct discharge and sentenced to 90 days of hard labor in a plea deal for frequently using drugs during his combat deployment, joining an assault on a comrade, and keeping digital photos of Afghan casualties. He was also required to testify against others in the case.

=== Staff Sergeant Robert Stevens ===
Robert Stevens, an Army medic from Portland, Oregon, knew Gibbs while serving with him in A-52, the Brigade Commander's Personnel Security Detachment, where they served under CPT Samuel Lynn. The two maintained a close friendship and remained in contact after Gibbs had been transferred from A-52 to 2–1 Infantry. SSG Stevens was sentenced to nine months in prison as part of a plea deal to testify against 11 other Lewis-McChord based Stryker soldiers. He pleaded guilty to four charges, including shooting "in the direction of" two Afghan farmers for no reason. Stevens said Gibbs ordered him to shoot on the two farmers and that he regretted "not trying to stop Staff Sergeant Gibbs from trying to kill innocent people."

=== Private First Class Justin Stoner ===
PFC Justin Stoner was the soldier who caused the investigation to begin. Stoner was not charged and was honorably discharged in 2012.

=== Specialist Adam Winfield ===
Christopher Winfield, the father of platoon member SPC Adam C. Winfield, attempted to alert the Army of the "kill team's" existence when his son explained the situation from Afghanistan via a Facebook chat after the first killing. In response to the news from his son, Christopher Winfield called the Army inspector general's 24-hour hotline, the office of Senator Bill Nelson (D-Fla.), and a sergeant at Joint Base Lewis-McChord who told him to call the Army's Criminal Investigation Division. He then contacted the Fort Lewis command center and spoke to a sergeant on duty who agreed that SPC Winfield was in potential danger, but he had to report the crime to his superiors before the Army could take action.

On August 5, 2011, Winfield, charged with premeditated murder and conspiracy to commit murder, pleaded guilty under a plea deal to involuntary manslaughter and use of an illegal controlled substance. The involuntary manslaughter charge stems from Winfield's failure to intervene and prevent the other soldiers from carrying out the attack against the Afghan in U.S. custody. Under the plea deal, he didn't admit to the killing of Mullah Adahdad. He claimed that he fired his automatic weapon away from Adahdad, but was guilty of doing nothing to stop the murder. He was sentenced to 3 years in prison, reduced in rank to Private, ordered to forfeit all pay and allowances, and given a bad conduct discharge. He was released from prison in August 2012.

=== Specialist Michael Wagnon ===
In 2011, Wagnon faced the following charges: possessing a human skull fragment, conspiracy to harm Afghans, premeditated murder, assaulting noncombatants, trying to destroy evidence. After pretrial hearings, an Army investigating officer twice recommended that prosecutors drop the charges, and in February 2011, Lewis-McChord senior commander Maj. Gen. Lloyd Miles dismissed them, ending the Army's prosecution.

== U.S. Army response ==
The U.S. Army issued an apology for the photos, stating that "These court-martial proceedings speak for themselves. The photos appear in stark contrast to the discipline, professionalism and respect that have characterized our soldiers' performance during nearly 10 years of sustained operations." In a Department of Defense Press release on March 28, 2011, the Army stated:

The Army will relentlessly pursue the truth, no matter where it leads, both in and out of court, no matter how unpleasant it may be, no matter how long it takes. As an Army, we are troubled that any soldier would lose his 'moral compass' as one soldier said during his trial. We will continue to do whatever we need to as an institution to understand how it happened, why it happened and what we need to do to prevent it from happening again.

According to a secret U.S. Army investigative report obtained by Der Spiegel, Colonel Harry Tunnell's (of the 5th Stryker Brigade) "inattentiveness to administrative matters ... may have helped create an environment in which misconduct could occur." However, the report, according to Der Spiegel, cleared him of responsibility stating there was no 'causal relationship' between the killings and his "aggressive leadership style". At least a dozen media organizations have filed Freedom of Information Act requests for the report.

The Army Times reported on the investigation into Harry Tunnell's leadership of the 5th Stryker Brigade and its conclusions. The brigade was reported to be "rife with lapses of discipline, misdirection and mixed signals about its mission." Tunnell's leadership, which the report says included, a "lack of emphasis on administrative matters such as command inspections and urinalysis, 'may have helped create an environment in which misconduct could occur,' the investigation found".

== In media ==
A 2013 documentary film, titled The Kill Team, reports on the murders and the people involved. A 2019 American war film, also titled The Kill Team, is based on the events of the murders.

== See also ==
- Kandahar massacre (Afghanistan, 2012)
- Mahmudiyah killings (Iraq, 2006)
- Haditha killings (Iraq, 2005)
