= Viviane Andereggen =

Swiss filmmaker

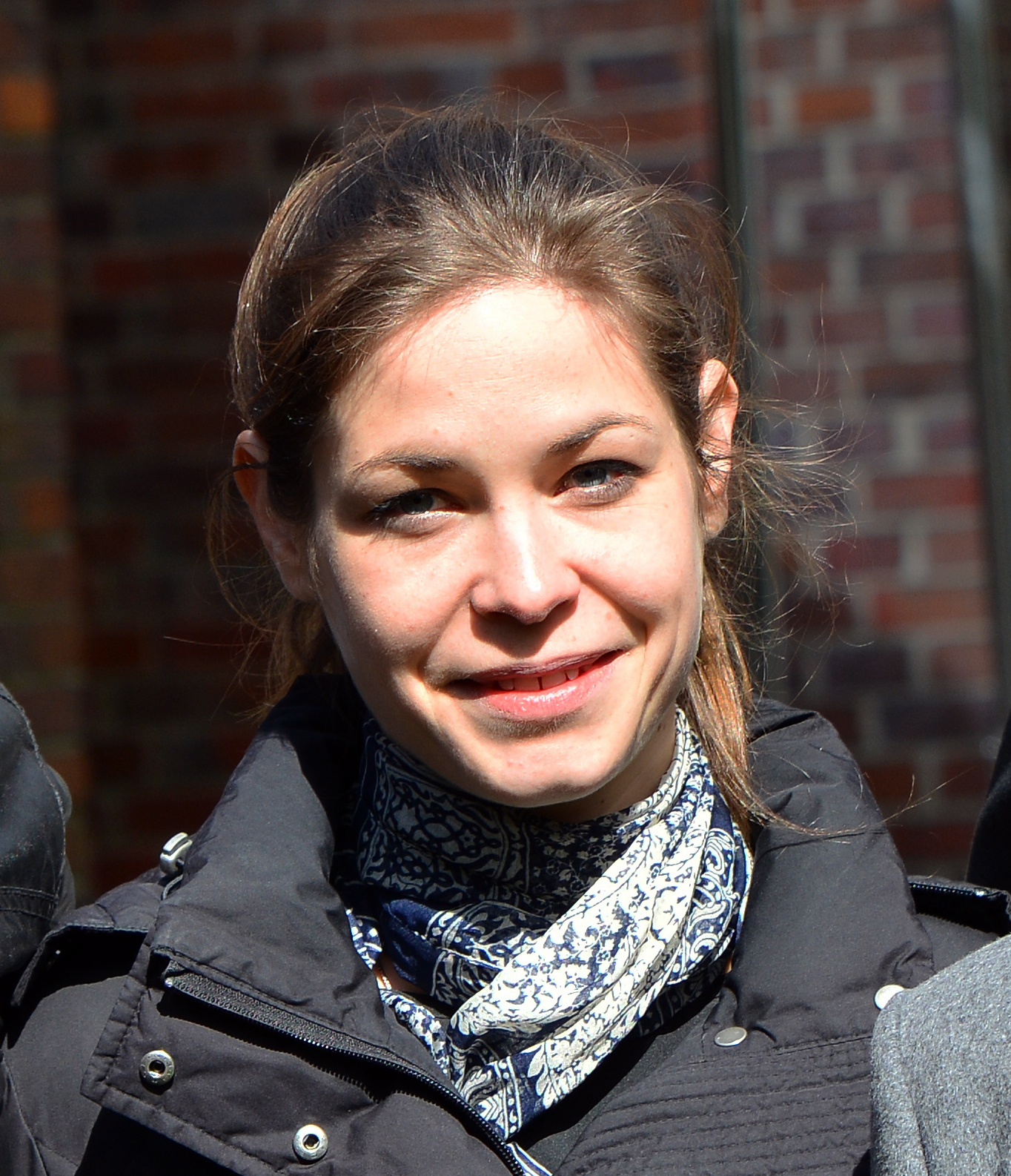
- Viviane Andereggen in 2015
- Born: 1985; Zürich
- Occupation: filmmaker

Viviane Andereggen (born in Zürich) is a Swiss filmmaker.

== Life ==
Viviane Andereggen grew up in Hungary and Switzerland. From 2007 to 2010, she studied at the Academy of Art and Design in Basel as well as media studies and ethnology at the University of Basel. In addition to her studies, she also worked as a freelance photographer. For Der Spiegel, Credit Suisse and Swisscom and as a video artist at various German-speaking theaters, for example at the Maxim Gorki Theater, at the Schauspielhaus Düsseldorf, at the Schauspiel Hannover, at the Schauspiel Frankfurt, at the Theater Basel and at the Theater Freiburg.

From 2010 to 2012, Viviane Andereggen studied with Wim Wenders in the film studies program at the Hamburg University of Fine Arts. During her subsequent regimental studies from 2012 to 2015 at the Hamburg Media School, several short films and her first full-length feature film Time to Say Goodbye.

In 2019, she directed Die Drei !!!, based on German editions of the Three Investigators, written by Sina Flammang and Doris Laske. The film stars Lilli Lacher, Alexandra Petschmann, Paula Reinzler, Jürgen Vogel, Thomas Heinze, Bibiana Beglau, Sylvester Groth, and Armin Rohde. Viva Kids released an English-dubbed-only DVD of the film in the United States under the title BFF Detectives.

== Awards ==
With the Kurzfilm Gross instead of Klein, Viviane Andereggen won the Red Bull Film Competition 2012.

With her short film For Lotte she took part in the competition of the Filmfestival Max Ophüls Preis 2014 and won the second prize at the International Filmfestival Larissa / Artfools in Greece. Her short film Habib and the Dog also celebrated the premiere at the Filmfestival Max Ophüls Prize 2014 and won the 3rd place at the Filmkunstfest Mecklenburg-Vorpommern and received an honorable mention at the Festival del Cinema 2014 in Brescello.

She received the audience award "Best short film" at the award of the Hamburg Studio Nachwuchspreise 2015, was awarded as "Best international short fiction film" at the Monterrey International Film Festival in Mexico and received the White Venus at the Category "Best leading role" at the Filmets Badalona Film Festival in Barcelona.

== Filmography ==
- 2012: Gross statt Klein (Short film)
- 2013: Für Lotte (Short film)
- 2013: Habib und der Hund (Short film)
- 2014: Schuld um Schuld (Short film)
- 2015: Time to Say Goodbye
- 2015: Hattinger und der Nebel
