= David Pecker =

American publisher (born 1951)

- Born: David Jay Pecker; September 24, 1951 (age 75); New York City, U.S.
- Education: Pace University (BBA)
- Title: Chairman, CEO, and President, AMI Paper Inc.
- Spouse: Karen Balan (m. 1987)

David Jay Pecker (born September 24, 1951) is an American publishing executive and businessman who was the CEO of American Media until August 2020. He was the publisher of Men's Fitness, Muscle and Fitness, Flex, Fit Pregnancy, Shape, and Star. He was also the publisher of National Enquirer, Sun, Weekly World News, and Globe.

In 2018, Pecker became embroiled in controversy regarding his involvement in a catch and kill operation under which his company would buy exclusive rights to stories that might embarrass his friend Donald Trump, the idea being to prevent those stories from becoming public during the latter's 2016 presidential campaign.

== Early life ==
David Jay Pecker was born on September 24, 1951, in the Bronx, New York City. He is of Jewish descent. His father was a bricklayer who died in 1967 when Pecker was 16. To support his mother, he started bookkeeping for local businesses in New Rochelle, New York and in the Bronx. He graduated from New Rochelle High School in 1969 and enrolled at Westchester Community College. After transferring to Pace University, he graduated in 1973.

== Career ==
After college, Pecker began his career as an accountant at Price Waterhouse and in 1979 joined the accounting department at CBS's magazine division, rising to vice president and comptroller. Eight years later, CBS sold its magazine division in a leveraged buyout to its manager, Peter Diamandis; Pecker stayed on in his position. Diamandis later sold the magazines to Hachette Filipacchi Médias. After Diamandis's departure three years later, Pecker was appointed CEO at Hachette Filipacchi Media U.S. In 1999, Pecker left Hachette when he raised capital from Thomas H. Lee Partners and Evercore Partners to buy American Media, Inc. (AMI), publisher of the Star, the Globe, the National Enquirer, and the Weekly World News.

During his time as chairman and chief executive officer of AMI Pecker was publisher of the magazines Men's Fitness, Muscle and Fitness, Flex, Fit Pregnancy, Shape and Star, as well as the supermarket tabloids National Enquirer, Star, Sun, Weekly World News, Globe. Sun and Weekly World News have ceased publication. In 2019, Pecker announced that he had agreed to drop more of AMI's tabloids and sell the National Enquirer, Globe and National Examiner to Hudson News.

Pecker is on the board of directors of iPayment Holdings, Inc., Sunbeam Products, Inc. and Next Generation Network, Inc. In August 2018, after his interactions with President Donald Trump were heavily reported, Pecker resigned as a director of Postmedia Network Canada Corp., a Canadian media company, a position he had held since October 2016.

In 2016, Pecker revealed to the Toronto Star that American Media Inc. now relied on support from Chatham Asset Management and its owner Anthony Melchiorre due to financial troubles. By the time Pecker agreed to sell the National Enquirer on April 10, 2019, Chatham Asset Management owned 80 percent of American Media Inc's stock. Melchiorre, who expressed dismay towards the National Enquirer's scandals involving assistance to Trump's 2016 Presidential campaign and blackmail of Jeff Bezos, was also instrumental in forcing Pecker and American Media Inc. to sell the National Enquirer as well.

AMI removed Pecker as CEO in August 2020, keeping him on in the role of executive advisor. Simultaneously, the company was renamed a360Media in anticipation of a merger with another Chatham property, the logistics firm Accelerate 360.

== Involvement with Donald Trump ==
External image
- David Pecker Hosts Playboy's 50th Anniversary Celebration Zimbio

Beginning in March 1998, Hachette Filipacchi Media U.S., of which Pecker was then CEO, began producing Trump Style, which was distributed to guests at Donald Trump's properties. Pecker has described himself as a close friend of Trump. Pecker supported Trump's initial run for president as part of the Reform Party in 2000.

In an August 2015 meeting at Trump Tower, Pecker offered to Trump that he would use the National Enquirer to catch and kill any allegations of sexual affairs against him. AMI would even personally facilitate payment to Karen McDougal.

Trump's lawyer Michael Cohen requested that Pecker's AMI buy the rights to Stormy Daniels's story, though Pecker refused to do so. However, it was later alleged that Pecker did in fact alert the Trump camp about Daniels going public with her sex affair allegation, which in turn would lead to a $130,000 hush money payoff.

By 2018, Pecker and AMI found themselves under investigation for using catch and kill payments, in which AMI purchased the exclusive rights to stories that might have been damaging to Trump's 2016 campaign for President and then refused to publish them. Such a tactic may have represented illegal and/or undeclared "in-kind" campaign donations under Federal Election Commission rules.

In March 2018, Karen McDougal filed a lawsuit against American Media in Los Angeles Superior Court, aiming to invalidate the non-disclosure agreement preventing her from speaking about an alleged affair with Trump. Pecker had directed AMI to purchase the exclusive rights to the story for $150,000 in 2016, allegedly to keep it from the public. In April 2018 the lawsuit was settled and McDougal was released from the agreement. AMI also agreed to feature her on the cover of another AMI magazine, Men's Journal, in September 2018.

In April 2018, FBI agents searched the office and residences of Michael Cohen, in part to search for evidence of Trump's involvement in the payment to McDougal. In July 2018, a tape became public which confirmed this payment; the tape was secretly recorded by Cohen during a conversation with then candidate Trump in 2016.

In late 2015, AMI paid $30,000 to Dino Sajudin, a doorman at Trump Tower, to obtain the rights to his story in which he alleged Trump had an affair in the 1980s that resulted in the birth of a child. Sajudin in April 2018 identified the woman as Trump's former housekeeper. AMI reporters were given the names of the woman and the alleged child, while Sajudin passed a lie detector test when testifying that he had heard the story from others. Shortly after the payment was made, Pecker ordered the reporters to drop the story. In April 2018, AMI chief content officer Dylan Howard denied the story was "spiked" in a catch and kill operation, insisting that AMI did not run the story because Sajudin's story lacked credibility. CNN obtained a copy of the contract between AMI and Sajudin in August 2018, after AMI had released Sajudin from the contract. CNN published excerpts of the contract, which instructed Sajudin to provide "information regarding Donald Trump's illegitimate child", but did not contain further specifics of Sajudin's story.

Federal investigators subpoenaed Pecker and AMI in April 2018, with Pecker providing prosecutors details about the hush payments Cohen had arranged. In August 2018, Pecker was also granted witness immunity in exchange for his testimony of Trump's knowledge of the payments.

On February 27, 2019, Cohen testified under oath to the House Oversight Committee that he and Pecker conspired to "catch-and-kill" stories which had the potential to damage Trump.

On April 22, 2024, Pecker was the first witness to testify in Trump's New York criminal trial after being subpoenaed by prosecution, with the case being centered around the Stormy Daniels allegations. Pecker testified that the National Enquirer engaged in a practice of "checkbook journalism" which involved paying sources for stories, and that he "gave a number to the editors that they could not spend more than $10,000" and he had final say over celebrity stories, though he did not discuss his relationship with Trump during his first day of testimony. However, he would acknowledge that he had a private email address set up for things he didn't want his assistant to see and also revealed some of the last four digits of the multiple phone numbers he had during the time period of the allegations from 2015 to about 2017. Prosecutors have accused Trump, Pecker and Michael Cohen of being the three most important figures in a scheme which involved covering up some affairs Trump had with women, though Pecker was not formally charged with any wrongdoing.

On his second day of testimony, Pecker would give more detail about his relationship with Trump, stating that Michael Cohen used to feed him negative stories about Trump's enemies. Pecker's staff would then "embellish" the stories and show drafts to Cohen to get his feedback before publishing them. Pecker would also detail how he offered to deploy the "catch and kill" scheme, stating that he offered in 2015 to suppress negative stories about Trump and also flag any efforts which were made by women attempting to sell stories about Trump as well. Pecker specifically named the first "catch-and-kill" scheme targeted Dino Sajudin, a former Trump Tower doorman who alleged Trump fathered an illegitimate girl with a maid at Trump Tower. The National Enquirer would pay $30,000 for Sajudin's story, which was more than usual $10,000. The second "catch-and-kill" scheme involved Karen McDougal, with Pecker stating that he sent then-National Enquirer editor Dylan Howard to California to interview McDougal after Howard got word of her allegation. Pecker noted how he, Howard, and Michael Cohen conspired to get McDougal's cooperation, with McDougal ultimately agreeing to accept a $150,000 payment to give her story to the National Enquirer.

On April 23, 2024, Pecker testified in court that he and others at the National Enquirer had created false stories about Trump's political challengers in order to further Trump's first Presidential campaign, including one about Texas Senator Ted Cruz's father supposedly having ties to John F. Kennedy assassin Lee Harvey Oswald.

On April 25, he testified that he had spoken to Trump directly in 2016 about paying $150,000 to Karen McDougal to shut down her story. He said that Trump's lawyer Michael Cohen had asked Pecker to pay McDougal with the promise that Trump would reimburse him. Pecker sent an invoice from his shell company, Investor Advisory Services, to Cohen's shell company, Resolution Consultants. However, Trump never reimbursed American Media. Pecker also testified that he was aware at the time that it was illegal to coordinate with a political campaign to make this kind of payment to influence an election. As cover for the intention behind the payment, McDougal received a nondisclosure agreement about how she would write and model for Pecker's magazines.

== Accusations of extortion by Jeff Bezos and Ronan Farrow ==
In January 2019, Pecker's National Enquirer published what it called "sleazy text messages and gushing love notes" between Amazon CEO Jeff Bezos and Lauren Sánchez, a sexual partner at the time, now his wife. Bezos began investigating how his personal communications reached the paper. The next month, Bezos accused the National Enquirer of extortion and blackmail by threatening to release Bezos's intimate pictures, criminal accusations Pecker denied through an attorney. Bezos wrote that AMI proposed in writing that Bezos state publicly that he and his security consultant "have no knowledge or basis for suggesting that AMI's coverage was politically motivated or influenced by political forces". In return, AMI would withhold publication of the pictures.

Both AMI and the Manhattan prosecutor launched reviews of the accusations. Any violation of law by AMI would constitute a breach of the immunity agreement the company reached with prosecutors in 2018 after the paper agreed to "catch and kill" a story on behalf of then-candidate Donald Trump. Ronan Farrow, a journalist, said he and another journalist received similar demands from AMI.

== Personal life ==
In 1987, Pecker married Karen Balan.

In April 2024, Pecker acknowledged that checkbook journalism was a part of his editorial philosophy, and that he also believed that “The only thing that is important is the cover of a magazine.”

== See also ==
- 2017–18 United States political sexual scandals
- Personal and business legal affairs of Donald Trump
- Stormy Daniels–Donald Trump scandal
- Timeline of Russian interference in the 2016 United States elections
- Timeline of investigations into Donald Trump and Russia (January–June 2018)
- Timeline of investigations into Donald Trump and Russia (July–December 2018)
- Timeline of investigations into Donald Trump and Russia (2019)
