= Star (magazine) =

American celebrity tabloid magazine

- April 22, 2013 cover
- Chief Content Officer: Dylan Howard
- Categories: Tabloid
- Frequency: Weekly
- Total circulation: 782,333 (June 2012)
- First issue: 1974; 52 years ago
- Company: McClatchy
- Country: United States
- Based in: New York City
- Language: English
- Website: www.starmagazine.com
- ISSN: 1052-875X

Star is an American celebrity tabloid magazine founded in 1974. The magazine is owned by McClatchy and overseen by AMI's Chief Executive Officer, Tony Hunter.

== History ==
Star was founded by Rupert Murdoch in 1974 as competition to the tabloid National Enquirer with its headquarters in New York City. In the late 1980s, it moved its offices to Tarrytown, New York, and in 1990, Murdoch sold the magazine to the Enquirer's parent company, American Media, Inc. (Murdoch now owns the New York Post.) Originally an unstapled, supermarket tabloid printed on newsprint, Star's circulation declined.

In 1999, AMI was bought by investors fronted by David Pecker, who personally pledged that Star would never relocate to Florida. Less than a year later, Star was moved into AMI's headquarters in Boca Raton, Florida, sharing the building with the Enquirer and AMI's other recently acquired titles, such as The Globe, National Examiner, and Sun. Editor Phil Bunton was replaced before the move when he angered Pecker; Phil told the New York Post: "It's like having the Bosnians, Croats, the Jews and Arabs all together in the same area." Four years later, Pecker appointed former Us Weekly editor Bonnie Fuller to oversee the paper and, at her demand, he moved it back to New York in the summer of 2003.

At the beginning of 2004, Star switched to a more traditional magazine format. However, its page layout remains tabloid-derived, with sections including "Worst of the Week" and "Stars Without Makeup", which compare photos of stars with and without makeup. As of 2015, Star sells for US$4.99 per issue, with reduced rate subscriptions varying from 26 to 52 issues.

== Controversies ==
Star received attention in 1991 for writing a story about Kiss drummer Peter Criss, claiming that he had become homeless, was a habitual drunkard, and was living on the streets of Santa Monica, California. Star had instead interviewed and photographed a homeless man named Christopher Dickinson, who had passed himself off as Criss for years. The real Peter Criss was mourning his mother at the time and has stated that he was distressed to learn that his friends and associates believed the other story.

In 2011, actress Katie Holmes sued Star magazine for libel after the tabloid published a story about her that suggested she abused drugs. The original lawsuit was for US$50 million, but the case was settled before going into court for an undisclosed amount of money. The publisher publicly apologized in a print to Holmes, disclosing that a substantial donation was going to be done under her name to a charity of her choice.

A Star magazine's chief editor said that people are only intrigued by the "juiciest dirt", leaving the cover page to be where the most gossip and biggest celebrity news is to be shown. Jennifer Aniston has stated that "if you cooperate with one of the magazines, their competitors become vengeful and attack clients. There is no upside to working with them… Their tactic is to make up stories that are so damaging".

Britney Spears has had a long history with paparazzi, and this was the theme of her 2007 award winning music video Piece of Me. Covers of tabloid magazines are shown, and one is titled "RATS weakly". 'RATS' is 'STAR' spelled backward. (It does not mention the fact that Star headquarters is in Boca Raton, which can be loosely translated as 'mouth of the rat'.)
