= Frank Gifford =

American football player and television commentator (1930–2015)

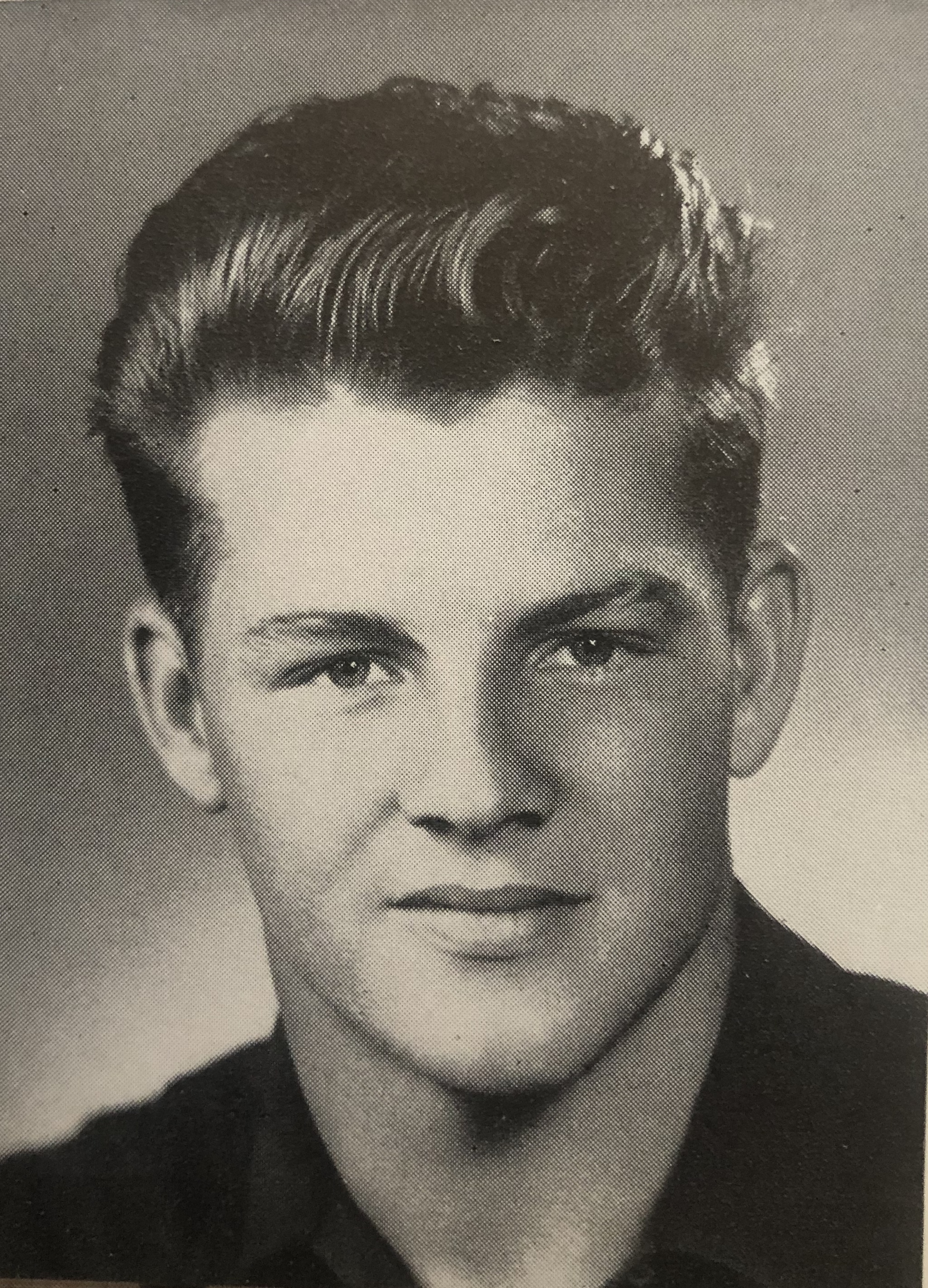
- Gifford at USC, c. 1949

No. 16
- Positions: Halfback, flanker, safety

Personal information
- Born: August 16, 1929; Santa Monica, California, U.S.
- Died: August 9, 2015 (aged 85); Greenwich, Connecticut, U.S.
- Listed height: 6 ft 1 in (1.85 m)
- Listed weight: 197 lb (89 kg)

Career information
- High school: Bakersfield (Bakersfield, California)
- College: Bakersfield (1948); USC (1949–1951)
- NFL draft: 1952: 1st round, 11th overall pick

Career history
- New York Giants (1952–1960; 1962–1964)

Awards and highlights
- NFL champion (1956); NFL Most Valuable Player (1956); NFL Comeback Player of the Year (1962); 6× First-team All-Pro (1953, 1955–1959); 8× Pro Bowl (1953–1959, 1963); NFL 1950s All-Decade Team; New York Giants Ring of Honor; New York Giants No. 16 retired; 4th greatest New York Giant of all-time; First-team All-American (1951); First-team All-PCC (1951)

Career NFL statistics
- Rushing yards: 3,609
- Rushing average: 4.3
- Rushing touchdowns: 34
- Receptions: 367
- Receiving yards: 5,434
- Receiving touchdowns: 43
- Interceptions: 2
- Points scored: 484
- Stats at Pro Football Reference
- Pro Football Hall of Fame
- College Football Hall of Fame

Francis Newton Gifford (August 16, 1929 – August 9, 2015) was an American professional football player, actor, and television sports commentator. After a 12-year playing career as a halfback, flanker and safety for the New York Giants of the National Football League (NFL), he was a play-by-play announcer and commentator for 27 years on ABC's Monday Night Football.

Gifford won the NFL Most Valuable Player Award from United Press International (UPI) in 1956, the same season his team won the NFL Championship. During his career, he participated in five league championship games and was named to eight Pro Bowls. He was inducted into the Pro Football Hall of Fame in 1977. After retiring as a player Gifford was an Emmy Award-winning sportscaster, known for his work on ABC's Monday Night Football, Wide World of Sports, and the Olympics. He was married to television host Kathie Lee Gifford from 1986 until his death.

== Early life and education ==
Gifford was born in Santa Monica, California, the son of Lola Mae (née Hawkins) and Weldon Gifford, an oil driller. He graduated from Kern County Union High School, later renamed Bakersfield High School.

After Gifford died, his wife Kathie Lee Gifford said her late husband grew up in a poverty-stricken home and that he and his family sometimes ate dog food. She said they lived in 29 places before Gifford attended high school because his father could not find work during the Depression. She also said that as a young child, the family attended church every week and Gifford "asked Jesus into his heart and that remained with him for the rest of his life".

=== College ===
Gifford was unable to gain an athletic scholarship to the University of Southern California (USC) because of his low grade point average in high school. As a result, he played a season of football for Bakersfield Junior College. While at Bakersfield, he made the Junior College All-America team and earned the grades needed to enroll at USC. At USC, Gifford was named an All-American after rushing for 841 yards on 195 carries during his final season. While at USC he was a member of Phi Sigma Kappa fraternity. He graduated from USC in 1952.

== NFL career ==
Gifford's November 1960 concussion dominated the New York media.

Gifford spent his entire National Football League (NFL) career with the New York Giants, beginning in 1952, playing both offense and defense. He made eight Pro Bowl appearances and had five trips to the NFL Championship Game. Gifford's best season may have been 1956, when he won the league's Most Valuable Player Award and led the Giants to the NFL title over the Chicago Bears.

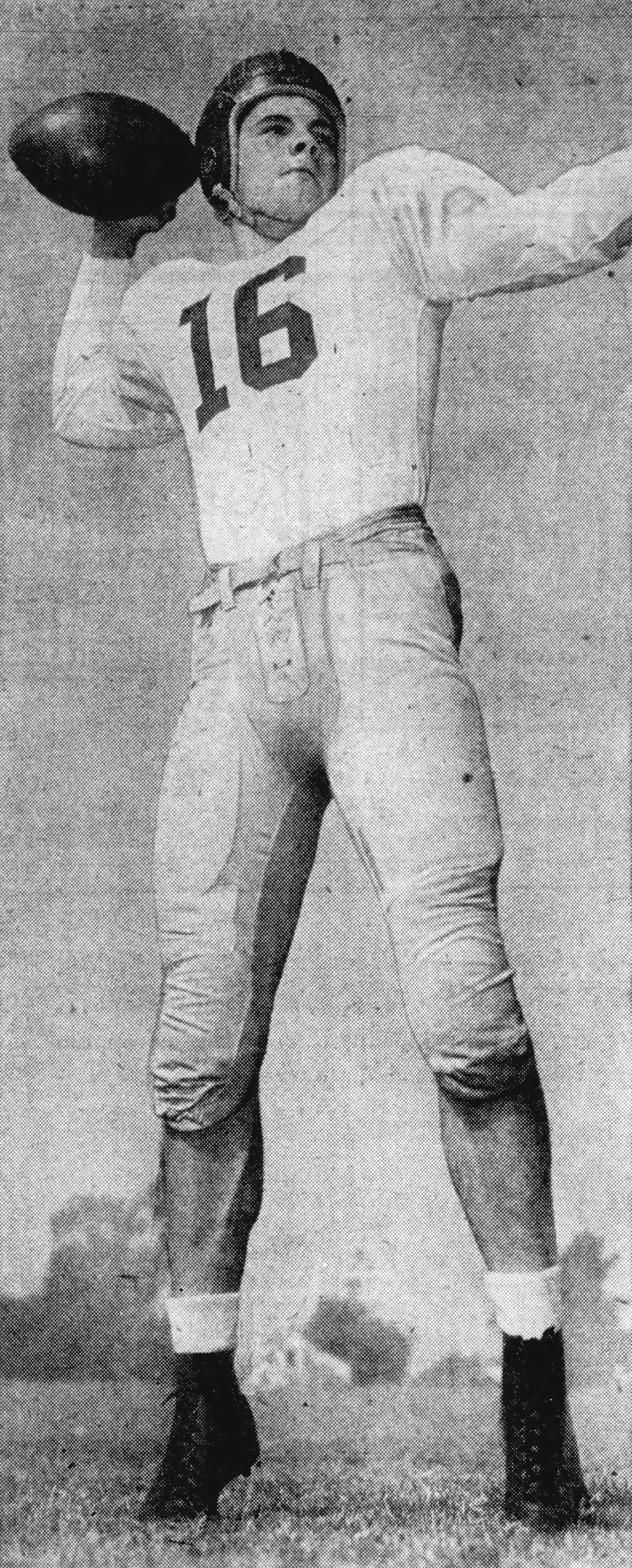
Gifford in 1950

He lost 18 months in the prime of his career when he was tackled by Philadelphia Eagles linebacker Chuck Bednarik, in what is widely considered the hardest defensive hit, or one of the hardest, in the history of the NFL and is often referred to simply as The Hit. During a 1960 season game against the Eagles, he was knocked out by Bednarik on a passing play, suffering a severe concussion that led him to retire from football in 1961. However, Gifford returned to the Giants in 1962, changing positions from halfback to flanker.

His Pro Bowl selections came at three positions, safety, halfback, and flanker. He permanently retired following the 1964 season.

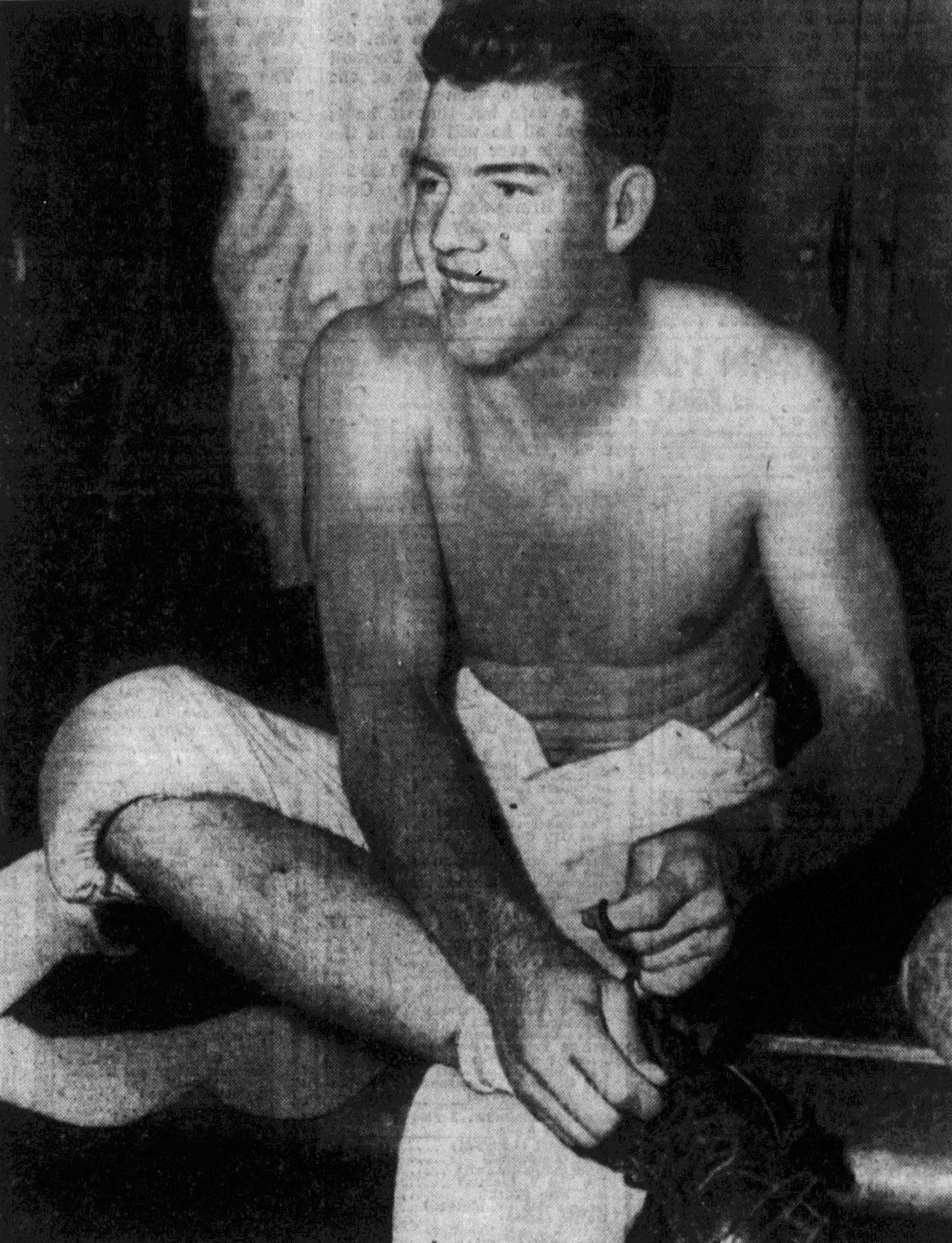
Gifford in 1951

During his 12 seasons with the Giants (136 regular-season games) Gifford had 3,609 rushing yards and 34 touchdowns in 840 carries; he also had 367 receptions for 5,434 yards and 43 touchdowns. Gifford completed 29 of the 63 passes he threw for 823 yards and 14 touchdowns with 6 interceptions. The 14 touchdowns is the most among any non-quarterback in NFL history; the 6 interceptions is tied with Walter Payton for most thrown by a non-quarterback.

Gifford was inducted into the Pro Football Hall of Fame on July 30, 1977.

After his death, an autopsy on his brain revealed that he lived with chronic traumatic encephalopathy (CTE), a disease closely related to repeated head trauma. As of September 18, 2015, 87 out of 91 former NFL players tested had been diagnosed with the disease.

== Entertainment career ==
=== Broadcasting ===
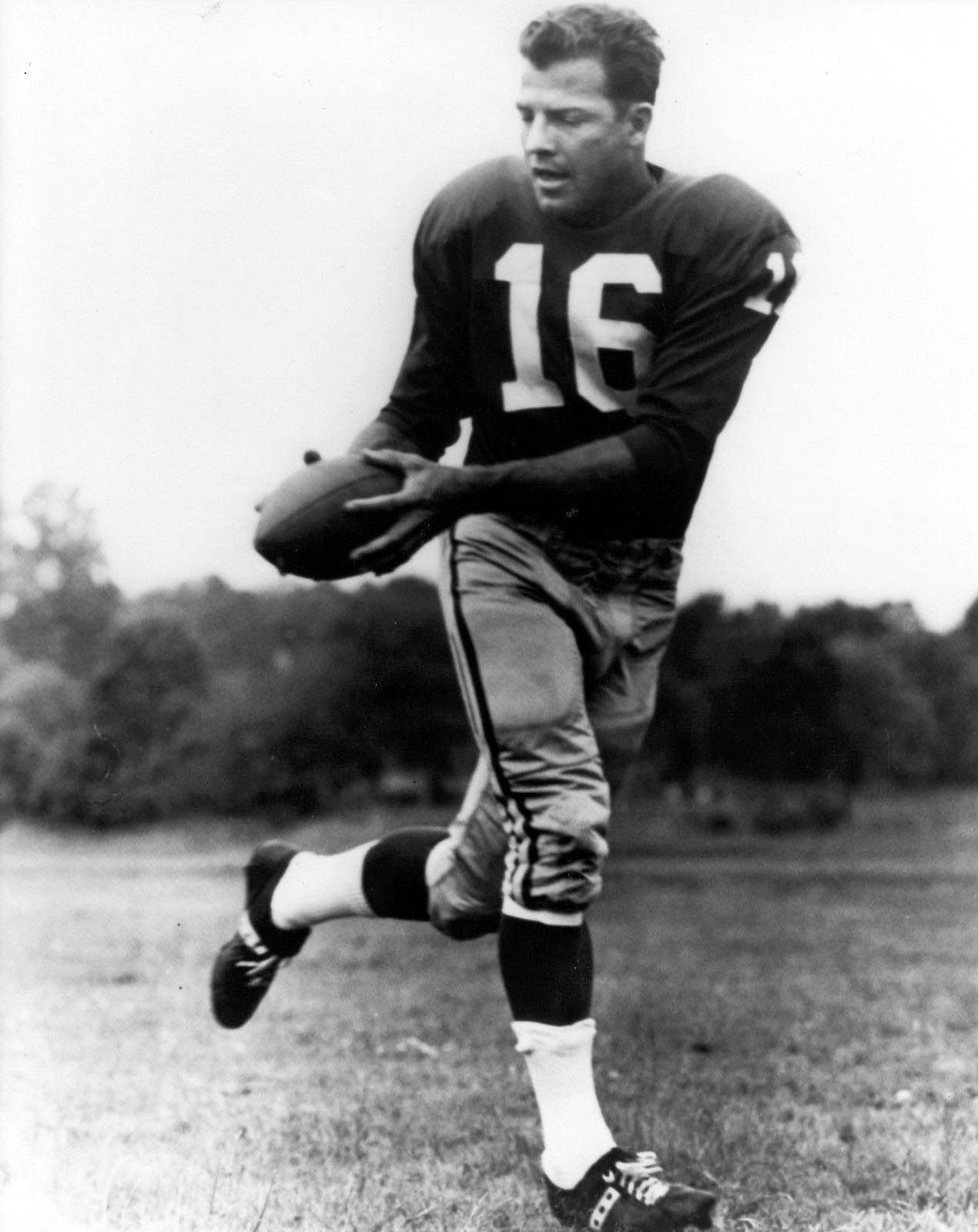
Gifford c. 1952-1964

After his playing days ended, Gifford became a broadcaster for CBS, covering football, golf and basketball. When Monday Night Football was launched in 1970, ABC had originally planned to have Gifford in their broadcast booth, but he still had a year remaining on his contract with CBS. Instead Gifford recommended his friend Don Meredith who was hired. The following year, Gifford replaced Keith Jackson as Monday Night Football's play-by-play announcer, and remained involved with the show for 27 of its next 28 years. His low-key delivery provided a perfect counterbalance to broadcast partners Meredith and Howard Cosell. In an era with only three television broadcast networks, the series became the longest-running prime-time sports program in television history, and developed into one of television's most valuable franchises.

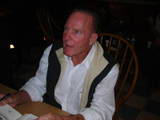
Gifford c. 2009

Gifford was providing play-by-play in the waning moments of a 1980 Monday Night Football game between the New England Patriots and Miami Dolphins when he and Cosell learned of John Lennon's murder. Cosell initially balked at breaking the news live on air, but Gifford convinced him, saying, "You’ve got to. If you know it, we’ve got to do it. Don’t hang on it. It’s a tragic moment, and this is going to shake up the whole world". Cosell then informed the national audience of the tragedy.

On January 20, 1985, Gifford provided play-by-play for the first Super Bowl to be broadcast on ABC, Super Bowl XIX between the San Francisco 49ers and Miami Dolphins in Stanford, California. Gifford was joined in the booth by Don Meredith and Joe Theismann.

In 1986, Al Michaels took over play-by-play duties, and Gifford switched to a color commentator role. However, Gifford did play-by-play for the next several years (Gifford was joined by Lynn Swann and O. J. Simpson on color commentary in 1986 and by Dan Dierdorf for the rest of his run on Monday Night Football) whenever Michaels was covering post-season baseball games for the network.

Gifford was replaced in the broadcast booth by Boomer Esiason in 1998. That season he was reassigned to a nominal role for ABC's Monday night pregame show, but that program was cancelled after one season. Gifford was not offered a new role by the network. Gifford was also host of British TV network Channel 4's NFL coverage with British born former New England Patriots kicker John Smith in 1986, which included coverage of Super Bowl XXI. Additionally, he narrated the official Super Bowl XLVIII highlight film for NFL Films, for which he had narrated the New York Giants' annual highlight films.

Gifford was also a reporter and commentator on other ABC sports programs, such as coverage of the Olympics (including the controversial men's basketball gold medal game between the United States and Soviet Union at the 1972 Summer Olympics in Munich, which Gifford called alongside Bill Russell), skiing and golf. He announced Evel Knievel's jumps for ABC's Wide World of Sports in the 1970s, including when Knievel failed to clear 13 buses at Wembley Stadium in 1975. Gifford also guest hosted Good Morning America on occasion, including once when he met his future wife, Kathie Lee.

In 1977, Gifford won an Emmy Award for Outstanding Sports Personality. He was given the Pete Rozelle Radio-Television Award by the Pro Football Hall of Fame In 1995 for his NFL television work.

Monday Night Football paid tribute to Gifford on September 14, 2015, by having ESPN announcers Mike Tirico and Jon Gruden wear the gold jackets that Gifford helped make famous as a broadcaster.

=== Acting roles ===
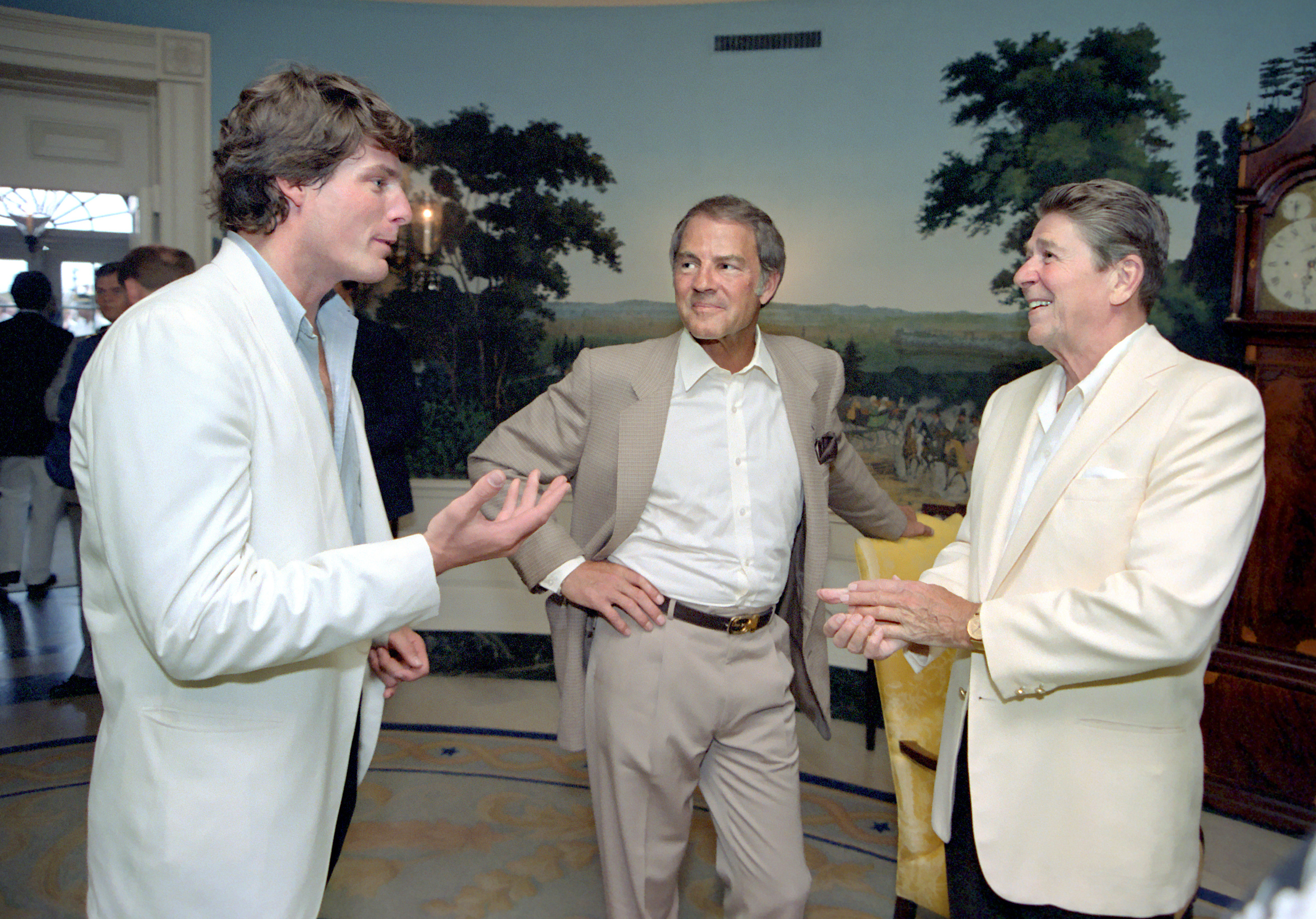
Gifford (center) with Christopher Reeve and President Ronald Reagan at a reception and picnic marking the 15th anniversary of the Special Olympics program in the Diplomatic Reception room of the White House, June 1983

Frank Gifford appeared as Ensign Cy Mount in the 1959 World War II submarine film drama Up Periscope, starring James Garner, Edmond O'Brien, Andra Martin, and Alan Hale Jr.

Gifford appeared as himself as a guest star on the NBC television series, Hazel, in the episode, "Hazel and the Halfback", which originally aired December 26, 1963. In the story, Gifford is interested in investing in a local bowling alley. In 1977, Gifford appeared as himself in the episode "The Shortest Yard" of the ABC sitcom The San Pedro Beach Bums. He also appeared as himself in a two-hour episode of The Six Million Dollar Man titled "The Bionic Boy" in the same year. In 1994, Gifford also appeared as himself in the Nickelodeon kids show The Adventures of Pete & Pete as a customer for the boy's Dad's driving range. In season one episode 4 titled "Rangeboy", Gifford and his wife, Kathie Lee, appeared in the February 28, 1995, episode of the ABC sitcom Coach, titled "The Day I Met Frank Gifford", in which a character on the show plots to meet the former football star who will attend an event to receive an award.

Gifford also had acting roles in television commercials.

== Personal life ==
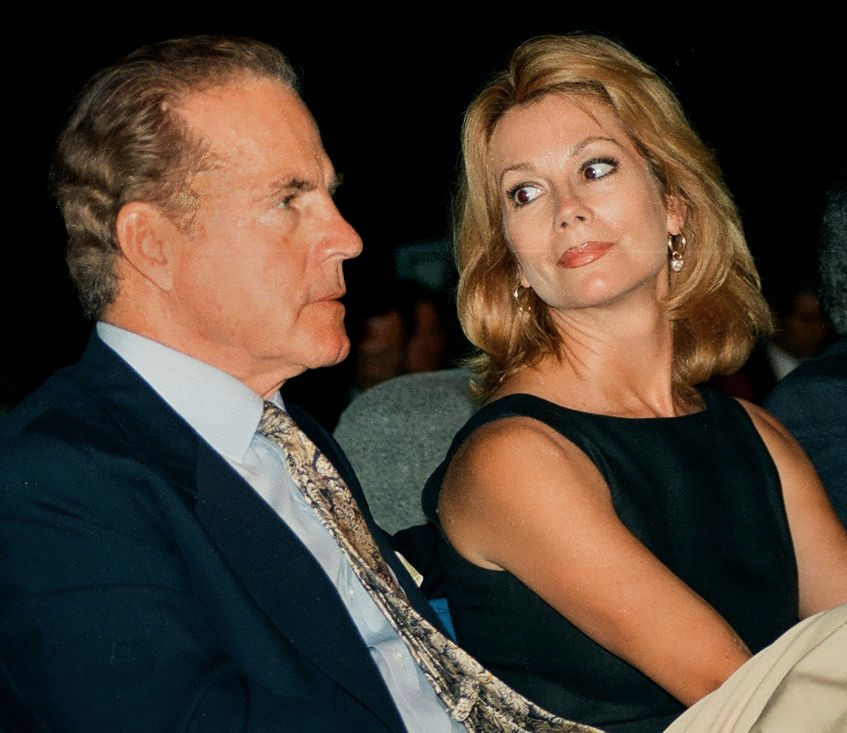
Gifford with his wife Kathie Lee in 1996

Gifford married his college sweetheart, USC's homecoming queen Maxine Avis Ewart, on January 13, 1952, after she became pregnant while they were students at USC. They had three children, Jeff (b. 1952), Kyle, and Victoria; and five grandchildren. Victoria Gifford married Michael LeMoyne Kennedy, son of Robert F. Kennedy. Frank Gifford was next married to fitness trainer Astrid Lindley from 1978 to 1986. His first two marriages ended in divorce. Gifford married television presenter and singer Kathie Lee Johnson, who was 23 years his junior, on October 18, 1986. The couple settled in Greenwich, Connecticut, with their son, Cody Newton Gifford and daughter, Cassidy Erin Gifford. Gifford and his third wife, Kathie Lee, shared the same birthday, August 16. The couple co-hosted ABC's coverage of the 1988 Winter Olympics in Calgary.

In 1997, the tabloid magazine Globe paid a woman named Suzen Johnson to meet, befriend, and lure Gifford into a New York City hotel room secretly equipped with videotape systems enabling the Globe to take and obtain photos of Gifford being seduced. They published photos and stories. ESPN reported that the tabloid paid Johnson $75,000 to lure Gifford to the room while The Atlantic said it was $125,000. National Enquirer editor Steve Coz observed, "There's a difference between reporting the news and creating the news ... [w]ithout The Globe, there would be no story here. I'm in the tabloid industry, and this is way over the top. It's downright cruel."

Henry Bushkin, Johnny Carson's former lawyer, claimed that Gifford had an affair with Carson's second wife, Joanne, in 1970.

== Death ==
On August 9, 2015, a week before his 86th birthday, Gifford died from natural causes at his Greenwich, Connecticut, home.

In November 2015, Gifford's family revealed that he had chronic traumatic encephalopathy (CTE). The family said, "After losing our beloved husband and father, Frank Gifford, we as a family made the difficult decision to have his brain studied in hopes of contributing to the advancement of medical research concerning the link between football and traumatic brain injury... We decided to disclose our loved one's condition to honor Frank's legacy of promoting player safety dating back to his involvement in the formation of the NFL Players Association in the 1950s." He was one of at least 345 NFL players to be diagnosed after death with this disease, which is caused by repeated hits to the head.

== Awards and honors ==
NFL

- NFL champion (1956)
- National Football League Most Valuable Player Award (1956; as recognized by UPI)
- Jim Thorpe Trophy (1956)
- NFL Comeback Player of the Year (1962)
- 6× First-team All-Pro (1953, 1955–1959)
- 8× Pro Bowl (1953–1959, 1963)
- Pro Bowl MVP (1959)
- NFL 1950s All-Decade Team
- New York Giants No. 16 retired
- 4th greatest New York Giant of all-time
- Honorary co-captain of Super Bowl XLVIII

College

- First-team All-American (1951)
- First-team All-PCC (1951)

Television

- Two-time Emmy Award winner
  - 1977 – Outstanding Sports Personality
  - 1997 – Lifetime Achievement Award

Halls of Fame

- College Football Hall of Fame (1975)
- Two-time Pro Football Hall of Fame inductee
  - 1977 as a player
  - 1995 as a Pete Rozelle Radio-Television Award winner
- New York Giants Ring of Honor
- University of Southern California Athletic Hall of Fame (inaugural class of 1994)
- Disney Legend (class of 2008)
- NSMA Hall of Fame (class of 2017)

== NFL career statistics ==
Legend
	AP NFL MVP
	Won NFL championship
	Led the league
**Bold**	Career high

=== Rushing/receiving ===
Year	Team	Games		Rushing						Receiving					Fumbles	
Year	Team	GP	GS	Att	Yds	Avg	Y/G	Lng	TD	Rec	Yds	Avg	Lng	TD	Fum	FR
1952	NYG	10	10	38	116	3.1	11.6	15	0	5	36	7.2	11	0	3	1
1953	NYG	12	9	50	157	3.1	13.1	15	2	18	292	16.2	49	4	2	3
1954	NYG	9	9	66	368	**5.6**	40.9	30	2	14	154	11.0	35	1	7	1
1955	NYG	11	11	86	351	4.1	31.9	49	3	33	437	13.2	54	4	5	0
1956	NYG	12	12	**159**	**819**	5.2	**68.3**	69	5	**51**	603	11.8	48	4	5	1
1957	NYG	12	12	136	528	3.9	44.0	41	5	41	588	14.3	63	4	**9**	1
1958	NYG	10	10	115	468	4.1	46.8	33	**8**	29	330	11.4	41	2	3	**5**
1959	NYG	11	11	106	540	5.1	49.1	**79**	3	42	768	18.3	**77**	4	5	2
1960	NYG	8	8	77	232	3.0	29.0	15	4	24	344	14.3	44	3	6	3
1962	NYG	**14**	**14**	2	18	9.0	1.3	12	1	39	**796**	**20.4**	63	**7**	1	0
1963	NYG	**14**	11	4	10	2.5	0.7	12	0	42	657	15.6	64	**7**	2	0
1964	NYG	13	12	1	2	2.0	0.2	2	1	29	429	14.8	40	3	–	–
Career		136	129	840	3,609	4.3	26.5	79	34	367	5,434	14.8	77	43	48	17

=== Passing ===
Year	Team	Passing								
Year	Team	Cmp	Att	Pct	Yds	Avg	TD	Int	Lng	Rtg
1952	NYG	1	2	50.0	18	9.0	1	0	18	120.8
1953	NYG	3	6	50.0	47	7.8	1	0	21	116.0
1954	NYG	4	8	50.0	**155**	19.4	**3**	1	**83**	95.8
1955	NYG	2	6	33.3	96	16.0	2	0	71	121.5
1956	NYG	2	5	40.0	35	7.0	2	1	29	64.6
1957	NYG	4	6	66.7	143	**23.8**	2	0	66	**149.3**
1958	NYG	3	10	30.0	109	10.0	1	1	63	66.2
1959	NYG	**5**	**11**	45.5	151	13.7	2	**2**	43	92.0
1960	NYG	3	6	50.0	24	4.0	0	1	13	20.8
1962	NYG	1	2	50.0	12	6.0	0	0	12	68.7
1963	NYG	1	1	**100.0**	33	**33.0**	0	0	33	118.7
Career		29	63	46.0	823	13.1	14	6	83	92.5

== Bibliography ==
Gifford is a character in Frederick Exley's novel A Fan's Notes. In the novel, Gifford becomes the narrator's hero while both are at USC. Subsequently, the narrator continues to be an intense fan of Gifford and his team, the New York Giants, during his NFL career.

=== Selected books ===
- Gifford, Frank; Richmond, Peter. (2008) The Glory Game: how the 1958 NFL championship changed football forever. New York : Harper. ISBN 978-0-06-154255-8
- Gifford, Frank; Waters, Harry. (1993) The Whole Ten Yards New York : Random House. ISBN 0-679-41543-2
- Gifford, Frank; Mangel, Charles. (1976) Gifford on courage. New York : M. Evans; Philadelphia : distributed by Lippincott. ISBN 0-87131-223-9

== Filmography ==
=== Film ===
Year	Title	Role	Notes	ref
1953	All American	Stan Pomeroy		
1959	Up Periscope	Ensign Cy Mount		
1973	The World's Greatest Athlete	Himself		
1977	Viva Knievel!	Himself		
1996	Jerry Maguire	Himself		
2002	Three Days of Rain	Extra		
2011	Beatles Stories	Guest		

=== Television ===
Year	Title	Role	Notes	ref
1956	What's My Line?	Himself		
1962	Captain Kangaroo	Himself	Episode: "October 6, 1962" (S 8:Ep 30)	
1963	Our Man Higgins	Guest	Episode: "Delinquent for a Day" (S 1:Ep 30)	
1963	Hazel	Himself	Episode: "Hazel and the Halfback" (S 3:Ep 15)	
1964	What's My Line?	Guest	Episode: "EPISODE #732" (S 16:Ep 4)	
1964	The Reporter	Himself	Episode: "How Much For A Prince" (S 1:Ep 3)	
1964	Password	Himself	Episode: "Lauren Bacall & Frank Gifford" (S 3:Ep 136)	
1965	Password	Himself	Episode: "Jane Wyatt & Frank Gifford" (S 4: Ep 151)	
1965	Password	Himself	Episode: "Betty White & Frank Gifford" (S 5: Ep 36)	
1966	Password	Himself	Episode: "Betty White & Frank Gifford" (S 5: Ep 86)	
1966	Password	Himself	Episode: "Betty White & Frank Gifford" (S 5: Ep 141)	
1966	Password	Himself	Episode: "Florence Henderson & Frank Gifford" (S 5: Ep 256)	
1966	Password	Himself	Episode: "Florence Henderson & Frank Gifford" (S 6: Ep 71)	
1967	Password	Himself	Episode: "Betty White & Frank Gifford" (S 6: Ep 196)	
1971–97	Monday Night Football	Play by Play Announcer	Main	
1975	The Way It Was	Panelist	Episode: "1958 NFL Championship" (S 1:Ep 1)	
1975	$10,000 Pyramid	Himself	Episode: "Kate Jackson & Frank Gifford" (S 3: Ep 36–40)	
1975	$10,000 Pyramid	Himself	Episode: "Sandy Duncan & Frank Gifford" (S 4:Ep 12–16)	
1976	The Six Million Dollar Man	Himself	Episode: "The Bionic Boy, part 1" (S 4:Ep 8)	
1977	The San Pedro Beach Bums	Himself	Episode: "The Shortest Yard" (S 1:Ep 2)	
1981	The Primetime Emmy Awards	Himself	Episode: "The 33rd Annual Primetime Emmy Awards" (S 33:Ep 1)	
1984	Webster	Himself	Episode: "You Can't Go Home Again" (S 2:Ep 7)	
1993	The Adventures of Pete & Pete	Himself	Episode: "Range Boy" (S 1:Ep 4)	
1995	Coach	Himself	Episode: "The Day I Met Frank Gifford" (S 7:Ep 20)	
1996	Coach	Himself	Episode: "You Win Some, You Lose Some" (S 9:Ep 8)	
1997	Spin City	Himself	Episode: "An Affair to Remember" (S 1:Ep 17)	
1999	Biography	Himself	Episode: "Kathie Lee Gifford: Having it All" (S 2:Ep 33)	
2000–05	SportsCentury	ABC Sports Reporter	Recurring	
2004	ESPN25: Who's#1?	Interviewee	Episode: "Most Outrageous Characters" (S 1:Ep 5)	
2007	Intimate Portrait	Guest		
2008	Celebrity Family Feud	Himself	Episode: "Episode 106" (S 1:Ep 2)	
2008	TMZ on TV	Himself	Episode: "Episode #2.029" (S 2:Ep 29)	
2008	Center Stage	Guest	Episode: "Frank Gifford" (S 4:Ep 6)	
2009	Psych	Play-by-Play voice		

== See also ==
- History of the New York Giants (1925–78)
- The Hit (Chuck Bednarik)
- List of Pro Football Hall of Fame inductees
- List of NFL players with chronic traumatic encephalopathy

Media offices
Preceded by Analysts for game in viewing area	The NFL Today host 1965–1970	Succeeded by Jack Whitaker
Preceded by Keith Jackson	Monday Night Football play-by-play announcer 1971–1985	Succeeded by Al Michaels
Preceded by Joe Namath and O. J. Simpson	Monday Night Football color commentator 1986 (sole commentator), 1987–1997 (with Dan Dierdorf)	Succeeded by Dan Dierdorf and Boomer Esiason
Preceded by First	Super Bowl television play-by-play announcer (non-cable prime-time package carrier); 1984	Succeeded by Al Michaels
Preceded by Jim McKay	ABC's Wide World of Sports host (with Becky Dixon from 1987–1988); 1987–1993	Succeeded by Julie Moran
