= Suzen Johnson =

Flight attendant; Frank Gifford's mistress

- Born: February 1951 (age 74–75); Washington D.C., U.S.
- Occupation: Flight attendant

Suzen Johnson (born February 1951) is a former flight attendant, businesswoman and model. In 1997 she was hired by The Globe to seduce ex-football player and sports reporter Frank Gifford, for a hit piece in The Globe. Gifford's wife, Kathie Lee Gifford, was the popular co-host at the time of Live! with Regis and Kathie Lee.

== Life and career ==
Johnson was born in Washington, D.C., and later moved to Florida. She married athlete and businessman Harold E. Johnson. In 1989, the couple opened two unsuccessful Fabulous New Woman Health Spas in New Bedford and Fall River, Massachusetts.

For many years she worked as a flight attendant for TWA. She had been scheduled to work on TWA Flight 800 which crashed in 1996, but swapped shifts the day before.

Johnson later worked as a real estate agent in Palm Beach, Florida.

== Affair with Gifford ==
In 1997, Johnson was hired by The Globe to lure Frank Gifford to the Regency Hotel in Manhattan, to a particular room where The Globe had secretly installed hidden recording equipment. After two unsuccessful attempts, she eventually tricked Gifford into going to the secretly bugged room on April 30 and May 1 and having sex with her. The Globe recorded the tryst and published their story that May. The Globe paid Johnson between $75,000 and $125,000.

National Enquirer editor Steve Coz observed: "It's one thing to catch a celebrity cheating and another to induce or entrap them. Without the Globe, there would be no story here. I'm in the tabloid industry, and this is way over the top. It's downright cruel."

== Aftermath ==
In November 1997, several months after the Gifford scandal, Johnson appeared on the cover of Playboy, and also appeared in a nude pictorial inside that issue.

The lengths to which the Globe went to get the story became a news issue on its own. In January 1999, the National Enquirer published a story about the Globe paying Johnson for the story about the affair, and in June 1999, she sued the publisher of The Globe, claiming that she was told the newspaper wanted to write only about their platonic relationship, and the paper had wired their hotel room without telling her. Johnson said she signed an agreement with the tabloid in March 1997 in which Globe officials offered $25,000 for the Gifford story, and an additional $25,000 for a photo of them together.

In 2001, she ran a website called "SuzenJohnson.com: Frank Gifford's Mistress Tells All", with her image from the Playboy cover. On the site, she wrote about her faith and her battles with the tabloids, had a picture gallery, and intended to have fitness information, a members section, and a store. The site closed in 2002.
