= National Examiner =

Weekly magazines published in the United States

- Cover of National Examiner (23 June 2014)
- Chief content officer: Dylan Howard
- Categories: Supermarket tabloid
- Company: Hudson Media
- Country: US
- Based in: New York City
- Language: English
- Website: nationalexaminer.com
- ISSN: 1094-6055

The National Examiner is a supermarket tabloid from America. It was formerly owned by American Media, Inc. (AMI). AMI's chief content officer, Dylan Howard, oversaw the publication.

The National Examiner has the fewest pages and is the least expensive tabloid in American Media's portfolio; it aims for an older audience. While its sister publications focus on more current content (such as the National Enquirer's focus on celebrity news and Globe's political and culture stories), the Examiner focuses on longer-standing stories featuring older (sometimes deceased) celebrities. Also prominently featured among the Examiner's stories are articles on daytime television.

The National Examiner was owned by the Globe Communications until 1999, when American Media acquired it and its sister publication Globe. The magazine was based in Boca Raton, Florida, until September 10, 2015, when it moved to New York City.

Like other tabloids, its contents have often come under question, and it has been derided for its sensationalistic writing.

On April 18, 2019, AMI agreed to sell the Examiner, along with the National Enquirer and Globe, to Hudson Group.

In February 2023, A360media agreed to sell the National Enquirer to VVIP Ventures, a joint venture of the digital media company Vinco Ventures and a new company set up for the purchase, Icon Publishing. As of July 7, 2023 the deal has collapsed as reported by The Wall Street Journal.

In 2026, Closer Weekly, an American magazine that covers celebrity nostalgia and updates on beloved Hollywood and television stars before ceasing publication in 2025, was relaunched as a weekly feature in The National Examiner. The National Examiner also launched a digital edition that same year.
