= Knewz =

News aggregator

- Industry: News
- Headquarters: New York City, United States
- Products: News aggregation
- Owner: Knewz Media Group, LLC
- Parent: News Corp (2013–2021) Empire Media Group (2021-present)
- Website: knewz.com

Knewz.com is an American news and news aggregation website owned by Knewz Media Group, LLC, a subsidiary of Empire Media Group, Inc. The content is produced by in-house human editors and IT specialists. The site also made use of artificial intelligence algorithms.

== Description ==
Created by News Corp, Knewz features stories from various news websites across the Internet; Knewz shared user data with those websites. Empire Media Group says the site includes news "from the widest variety of sources, free of filter bubbles and narrow-minded nonsense." The launch day press release indicated that Knewz sourced its stories from over 600 publishers, mostly in the United States. The website features a variety of sources from differing political leanings.

As of 30 January 2020, the site included national sources such as CNBC, CNN, Bloomberg, the Washington Post, the New York Times, NBC News and the New York Post, the Wall Street Journal, Fox News, Axios, The Blaze, Bleacher Report, BuzzFeed, Daily Kos, Deadline, Mother Jones, National Review, Newsmax, the Washington Examiner and Talking Points Memo, as well as local sources from all 50 U.S. states.

== Development ==
The trademark was filed in December 2018. In August 2019, the Wall Street Journal and Axios reported a website and mobile app were under development. The beta test was officially launched on 29 January 2020.

In July, 2021, News Corp shut the site down, citing lack of profitability. In the fall of 2021, Knewz has since been revived after being sold to Dylan Howard's Empire Media Group, under the standalone company Knewz Media Group, LLC, the company says.

Knewz.com also does its own reporting and has been featured in places such as The Associated Press, Drudge Report and Sean Hannity on Fox.

== See also ==
- List of assets owned by News Corp
