= J-14 (magazine) =

American magazine targeted at preteen and teenaged girls

- The July 2014 issue of J-14 featuring Rowan Blanchard, Sabrina Carpenter, Selena Gomez, Niall Horan, Harry Styles, Ariana Grande, 5 Seconds of Summer, Austin Mahone, Ross Lynch, Dove Cameron, and Miley Cyrus.
- Categories: Pop culture
- Frequency: Monthly
- Total circulation: 321,558 (2011)
- Founded: 1998
- First issue: January 1999
- Final issue: January 2024
- Company: American Media, Inc.
- Country: United States
- Based in: Englewood Cliffs, New Jersey
- Language: English, Spanish
- Website: j-14.com

J-14 was a monthly teenage magazine marketed at pre-teen and teenage girls around age 11–19. It is one of the earliest teen celebrity magazines. The magazine was among the top children's magazines in the 2012 list of Forbes.

In November 2023, it was announced that the print edition of J-14 would be discontinued in January 2024.

== History and profile ==
Launched in 1998, the first issue of the magazine hit stands in January 1999. It was started by Bauer Publishing, the United States division of the German firm Bauer Verlagsgruppe. The contents of these magazines include features like teen gossip, quizzes, fashion, posters, and information on celebrities that pertain to the readers. The name of the publication is a sound-alike abbreviation of its tagline "Just For Teens".

The headquarters of J-14 is in Englewood Cliffs, New Jersey.

In April 2015, the Spanish language online edition the magazine was launched.

American Media, Inc. acquired Bauer's US children's magazines in 2018.

== Circulation ==
An annual survey in 2007 by Experian Simmons Research of Fort Lauderdale, Florida, found that J-14 tied the former Nickelodeon Magazine among American girls 8–14 for familiarity, with nearly one in three girls in that age group surveyed saying they had read or looked at the magazine. Circulation was 217,183 copies in 2006.
