= Closer (magazine) =

British women's entertainment magazine

- Editor: Jane Johnson (English edition), Laurence Pieau (French edition)
- Categories: Entertainment
- Frequency: Weekly
- Publisher: Bauer Consumer Media (English edition), Ami Celebrity Publications (American edition), Reworld Media (French edition)
- Founded: 2005
- Country: United Kingdom, France, USA
- Language: English, French
- Website: closeronline.co.uk (UK) www.closerweekly.com (US)

Closer is a British tabloid magazine founded in 2005 and published by Bauer Consumer Media. A French language version followed shortly afterwards, and an American edition began publication in 2013, ending in 2025. In 2026, Closer was relaunched in the US as a weekly feature in The National Examiner.

== Profile ==
Closer mainly specializes in celebrity news and gossip, real-life stories, fashion and television/entertainment. There is also a French-language version of the magazine published by Mondadori, an Italian media company. The French edition had a circulation of 399,589 copies in 2005. In the spring of 2006, the British parent company East Midlands Allied Press announced that it would separate its French subsidiary, which was eventually acquired in August 2006 by Mondadori for 545 million euros when taking over Emap France. The 2010 circulation of the French version of the magazine was 466,000 copies.

== Controversies ==
In September 2012, the French edition of the magazine printed topless photos of the Duchess of Cambridge (Kate Middleton) taken, apparently with a long telephoto lens from a road 1 km away, while she and her husband Prince William were on a private holiday at the Château d'Autet in the south of France. The British edition promised that they would not publish the photographs, and distanced itself from the French edition after receiving numerous complaints.

The Royal Family said it intended to sue the magazine, calling the publication of the photographs a "grotesque and unjustifiable invasion of privacy"; the BBC's Nicholas Witchell stated that "he had rarely seen such a level of publicly expressed anger from the palace over such an incident."

In the 10 January 2014 issue, Closer "revealed the supposed affair" between French actress Julie Gayet and French President François Hollande. The issue was so popular that Closer "reprinted the issue, with a further 150,000 copies scheduled to hit newsstands" on 15 January 2014. The website of Closer also saw visitor numbers increase 800 percent to 1.4 million on 10 January 2014.
