= Fit Pregnancy =

- Editor-in-Chief: Peg Moline
- Frequency: Bimonthly
- Total circulation: 503,577 (December 2011)
- First issue: 1993
- Final issue: April 2015 (print)
- Company: Dotdash Meredith
- Country: USA
- Based in: New York City
- Language: English
- Website: www.fitpregnancy.com
- ISSN: 1079-3615

Fit Pregnancy is a Web site for pregnant women and new mothers.

== History ==
Fit Pregnancy was founded as a magazine in 1993 by Weider Publications as a spin-off of Shape Magazine. Weider Publications was acquired by American Media, Inc. in November 2002. In 2015, Fit Pregnancy was acquired by Meredith, who closed its print edition.

Peg Moline is the magazine's Editor-in-Chief.

Fit Pregnancy offers advice and health information from OB/GYNs and Pediatricians, such as Dr. Jay Gordon, Dr. Michel Cohen, and FitPregnancy.com's Ask the Labor Nurse blogger Jeanne Faulkner.

Fit Pregnancy's annual feature on The Best Cities to Have a Baby has been regularly featured on the NBC program Today. The magazine encourages breastfeeding, fitness, and regularly features a column on Environmentalism.

== Awards ==
Magazine excellence:

- National Information Health awards
- 19 Maggie Awards since 1999, such as for "Best Health & Fitness Consumer Magazine" for the October/November 2007 issue and for "Best Table of Contents" for the December/January 2008 issue.
- The Society of Publication Designers Award

== Famous pregnancies ==
Celebrity pregnancies which have been featured in the magazine include: Jessica Alba, Gabrielle Reece, Courtney Thorne-Smith, Brooke Burke, Lara Spencer, Cindy Crawford, Alex Kingston, Ming-Na, Kelli Williams, Jada Pinkett-Smith, Jane Kaczmarek, Ana Gasteyer, Jenny McCarthy, Toni Braxton, Catherine Bell, Christa Miller Lawrence, Kimora Lee Simmons, Rachel Griffiths, Denise Richards, Kathryn Sansone, and Chynna Phillips.

== Related articles, books, and DVDs ==
- The New York Times: The End of Childbirth 101? November 12, 2007
- Get Your Body Back After Baby Starring: Jennifer Gianni; Director: Linda Shelton Rating
- Your Complete Guide to a Fit Pregnancy by FitPregnancy (Author), Peg Moline (Editor)
