= Maer Roshan =

American writer

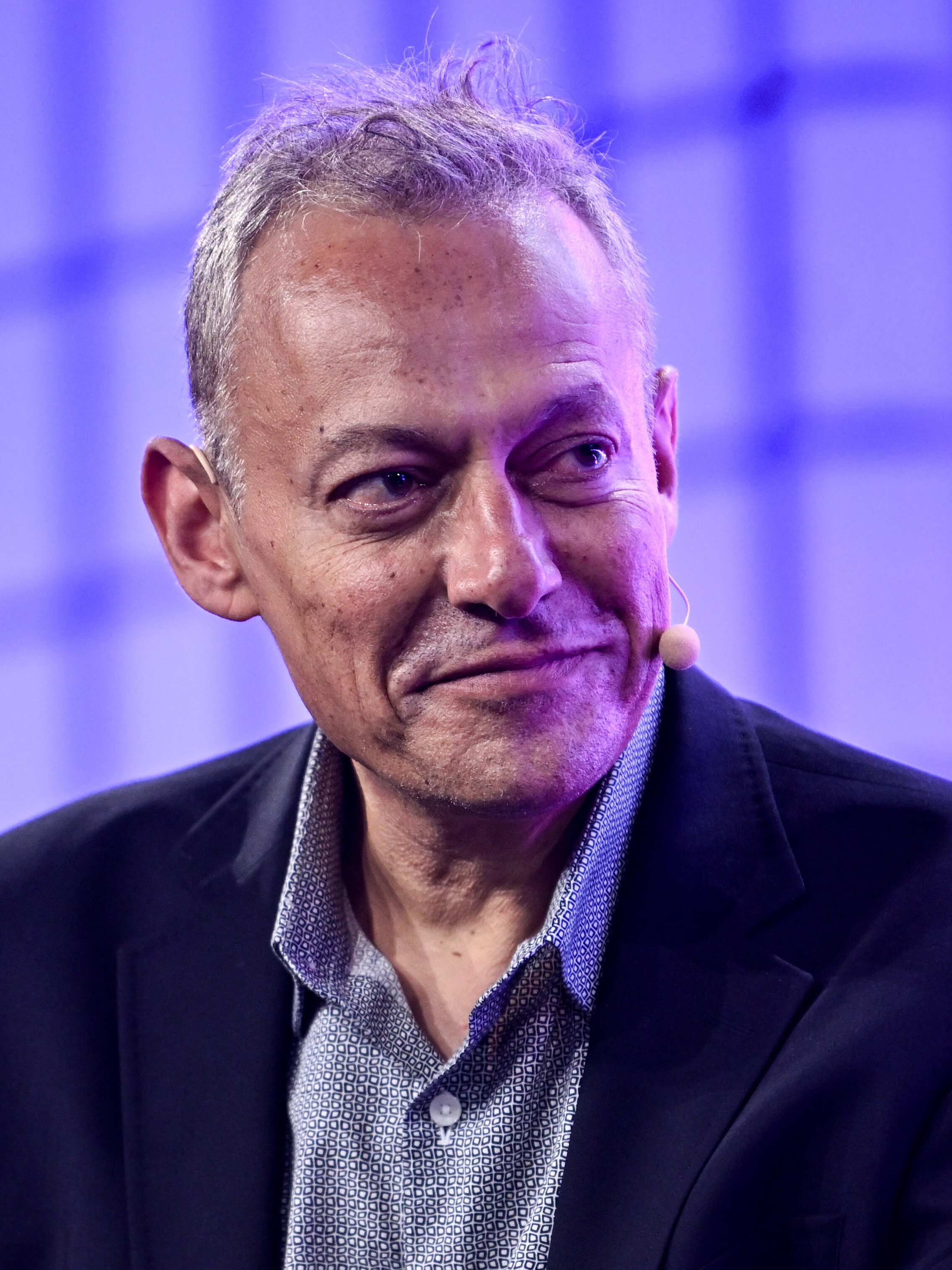
- Roshan in 2025
- Born: August 13, 1967 (age 59); Tehran, Iran
- Education: New York University

Maer Roshan is an Iranian-American editor, writer and entrepreneur who has founded and edited a series of prominent American magazines and websites. He currently serves as editor-in-chief of The Hollywood Reporter. Previously he was editor-in-chief of Los Angeles, Deputy Editor of New York, editorial director of Talk and Senior Editor of Interview. He also launched a number of influential national publications including Radar Magazine, Radaronline.com FourTwoNine.com, and Punch! NYQ, an award-winning LGBTQ weekly he co-founded in 1992, was later purchased by Time Inc. The Fix.com, launched in 2006, is the first daily news site about addiction and recovery. He has written for The New York Times, the Miami Herald, New York, The New Republic, The Advocate, Details and Harper's Bazaar.

== Early life ==
Maer Roshan was born to an Iranian Jewish father and American mother. Roshan moved to New York in 1979 with his mother and siblings, shortly after the Islamic Revolution. His father fled Iran 7 years after and died after arriving in the United States. He began his media career in 1989 after graduating from NYU as a crime reporter at the Key West Citizen and launched his first magazine, the gay weekly QW in 1991, at the height of the AIDS crisis, recruiting a prominent group of writers and editors including Andrew Solomon and David Rakoff. The magazine's coverage of politics and culture earned it a General Excellence Award from the Alternative Press Association. Soon after, Time Inc. hired him to create a national gay glossy, Tribe.

== Career ==
In 1994, Roshan was hired by Kurt Andersen as Deputy Editor of New York. He produced notable features, including the first interview with Donatella Versace after her brother Gianni Versace's murder and the first post-impeachment interview with Monica Lewinsky. In 2003, he received an Emmy for his work as Executive Producer of the New York Awards, a televised special on NBC.

Later that year, Tina Brown appointed Roshan as editorial director of Talk magazine. Following an editorial overhaul, he was credited by Adweek with "turning around the struggling publication, doubling circulation in ten months." Brown described him as "the only real natural male magazine editor of his generation."

After Talk ceased publication in 2002 due to the post-9/11 advertising downturn, Roshan launched Radar, a monthly magazine focusing on politics and pop culture. The New York Times hailed it as the year's most anticipated launch, with its first two test issues selling out nationwide. He secured $10 million in funding from investors including Mort Zuckerman and Jeffrey Epstein, with additional backing from Ron Burkle's Integrity Multimedia. Under his leadership, Radar integrated print and online media, attracting 1.5 million unique visitors monthly. In May 2008, Radar was nominated for a General Excellence award by the American Society of Magazine Editors.

In April 2011, Roshan launched TheFix.com, a daily website that became a leading addiction and recovery portal. In 2012, he founded Awesome Projects, a Los Angeles-based consultancy providing editorial services to companies including The New York Times, Yahoo!, Snapchat, The Hollywood Reporter, and Telepictures. In 2016, he became Chief Content Officer of FourTwoNine, a national LGBTQ-focused magazine and website.

In 2019, Roshan was appointed editor-in-chief of Los Angeles Magazine, serving until 2022. In 2023, he became Co-editor-in-chief of The Hollywood Reporter, sharing the role with Shirley Halperin. In 2025 he became the magazine's sole editor-in-chief.
