= Teen Boss =

Defunct American teen magazine

- Cover of the first issue of Teen Boss in September 2017
- Editor: Brittany Galla
- Categories: Teen; business
- Frequency: Quarterly
- Format: Slick
- Publisher: Bauer Media Group
- Founder: Brittany Galla
- Founded: 2016
- First issue: September 2017; 8 years ago
- Final issue: December 2018; 6 years ago
- Company: Bauer Media Group (2017–2018); American Media, Inc. (2018)
- Country: United States
- Language: English

Teen Boss (stylized as Teen Bo$$!) was an American teen magazine. It was founded and published by Bauer Media Group as a newsstand glossy in 2016 with a focus on entrepreneurship for girls between the ages of eight and 15. Its first issue was released in 2017 and its final issue was released in 2018. It was widely negatively received by critics and social media users during its run for what they considered to be its adultification of young girls.

== History ==
Teen Boss, a newsstand glossy with a focus on entrepreneurship for girls between the ages of eight and 15, was created by Bauer Media Group teen group director Brittany Galla in 2016. Galla came up with the idea for the magazine based on focus groups she had attended, where Generation Z girls had discussed their ideas for businesses and inventions, their selling of homemade slime and jewelry, and their passion for the ABC television series Shark Tank. Its first issue was released in September 2017 and it was released quarterly. It was sold exclusively in newsstands for $5.99 in stores such as Barnes & Noble and Walmart. It lacked a website or advertising in its pages and its only online presence was its Instagram and Facebook accounts. Its sections, which had a bright and "pink-heavy" aesthetic, included business cards, profiles of and interviews with teenage business owners and social media influencers, inspiration boards, how-tos, fashion tips, quizzes, and a recurring advice column by Shark Tank cast member Barbara Corcoran. Its first issue was a partnership with social media touring company DigiTour that featured social media personalities Nathan Triska, Tyler Brown, Simon Britton, and Kristen Hancher and DigiTour CEO Meridith Valiando Rojas on its cover. Its following issues also featured YouTubers on their covers, including Brooklyn and Bailey McKnight on its December 2017 cover and JoJo Siwa on its March 2018 cover.

Teen Boss was heavily criticized on social media and in the media, with critics decrying what they believed to be the magazine's adultification of children, its promotion of capitalism and materialism to young readers, and its focus on social media figures as entrepreneurs. For Slate, Heather Schwedel called it a "horrifying artifact of our time" and wrote that it advertised capitalism as being empowering, adding, "Should we really be teaching the young girls at whom the magazine is aimed that making money is the highest goal? ... Teen Boss says yes, because when you get rich, you also become strong and confident, probably because you have a lot of money, and the more of it that accrues in your bank account, the more empowered you grow, and that's all that counts." Jia Tolentino of The New Yorker criticized its concept as "unnerving" and its interview questions as sounding "auto-generated", writing that the magazine was "a tribute to precocious hustle and also to the life-changing magic of already being rich" and that reading it was "like watching a wall of YouTube videos inside a Claire's jewelry store while a tween-age life-style coach screams at you to double your net worth". For The Baffler, Liz Pelly wrote that Teen Boss had "a particular strain of parasitic nefariousness" defined by its feeding "on the developmental vulnerabilities of its young readers". Pelly also wrote that the magazine doled out classism "in large supply" and that its prospect of teaching young girls how to become social media influencers had "immense consequences that [Teen Boss] dangled in front of its readers while failing to accept the necessary responsibilities".

In 2018, Bauer sold the rights to Teen Boss, along with the rest of its teen-based publications, to American Media, Inc. The last issue of Teen Boss ran in December 2018 and its Facebook page was last updated that same month.
