= Death of Robert Stevens =

American journalist

Robert Stevens
- Born: June 20, 1938; United Kingdom
- Died: October 5, 2001 (aged 63); Boca Raton, Florida, U.S.
- Cause of death: Pulmonary anthrax
- Citizenship: United States
- Occupations: Photojournalist and photo editor
- Employer: Sun
- Organization: American Media
- Known for: First killed in the 2001 anthrax attacks
- Spouse: Maureen Stevens
- Children: 3

Robert K. Stevens (June 20, 1938 – October 5, 2001) was a British-born American photojournalist for the Sun, a subsidiary of American Media, located in Boca Raton, Florida, United States. He was the first journalist killed in the 2001 anthrax attacks when letters containing anthrax were mailed to multiple media outlets in the United States. The anthrax attacks also killed four others in the United States and sickened seventeen others.

== Personal ==
Robert Stevens was born in Britain, but he resided in Lantana, Florida, with his wife Maureen Stevens, also from Britain. Stevens and his wife had three children, Nicholas Stevens, Heidi Hogan, and Casey Tozzi. Many people described Stevens as a person who loved to spend time outdoors.

== Career ==
Robert Stevens was a newspaper photo editor for Sun, owned by American Media, until he was hospitalized on October 2, 2001. American Media published many different tabloids including the National Enquirer and the Sun. Many of the publications that Stevens worked on made claims that Elvis was not dead or that celebrities were pregnant with Martians.

== Death ==
Boca Raton is located within Florida and shown relative to the capital city Tallahassee and Miami.

In early October 2001, letters which contained anthrax were mailed to multiple locations across the United States. After a recent visit to North Carolina, Robert Stevens reported having symptoms similar to the flu. When he was first hospitalized, doctors believed he had developed meningitis. After the doctors completed further testing, it was discovered that he had developed pulmonary anthrax. This had also already been confirmed by the Centers for Disease Control and Prevention (CDC). Stevens died on October 5, 2001, making his death the first fatality from anthrax in the US in 25 years. After an investigation was conducted by the FBI, it was revealed that Stevens had come into contact with anthrax through the letter that was mailed to him at American Media in Boca Raton, Florida.

Stevens was the first person killed in these attacks. In addition to killing Stevens, the anthrax killed two postal workers in Washington, a hospital worker in New York, and a 94-year-old woman from Connecticut, and it caused seventeen other people to become sick. In addition, an envelope containing anthrax was opened in what was once the office of Senate Majority Leader Tom Daschle. As a result, the House of Representatives was closed down.

=== Investigation ===
During their investigation, the FBI concluded that Bruce Edwards Ivins, a microbiologist for the United States Army, had mailed the deadly letters. The FBI obtained some of the anthrax spores and analyzed them. After analyzing the spores, the FBI traced the spores to a military lab located at Fort Detrick, Maryland. Ivins quickly became a suspect in the investigation. The FBI began to suspect Ivins when they noticed he had logged in many late-night hours right before the attacks. He was questioned in March 2005 about the attacks, but he could not provide a valid reason why he had worked late those nights. In addition to this, Ivins had sent out several emails in which he discussed his mental state and treatment. In 2008 Ivins killed himself just as the FBI was preparing to arrest him. Leading up to his death, Ivins had been hospitalized for psychiatric evaluation after threatening to kill people he worked with, investigators of the anthrax attacks, and many other people who had supposedly wronged him.

=== Lawsuit ===
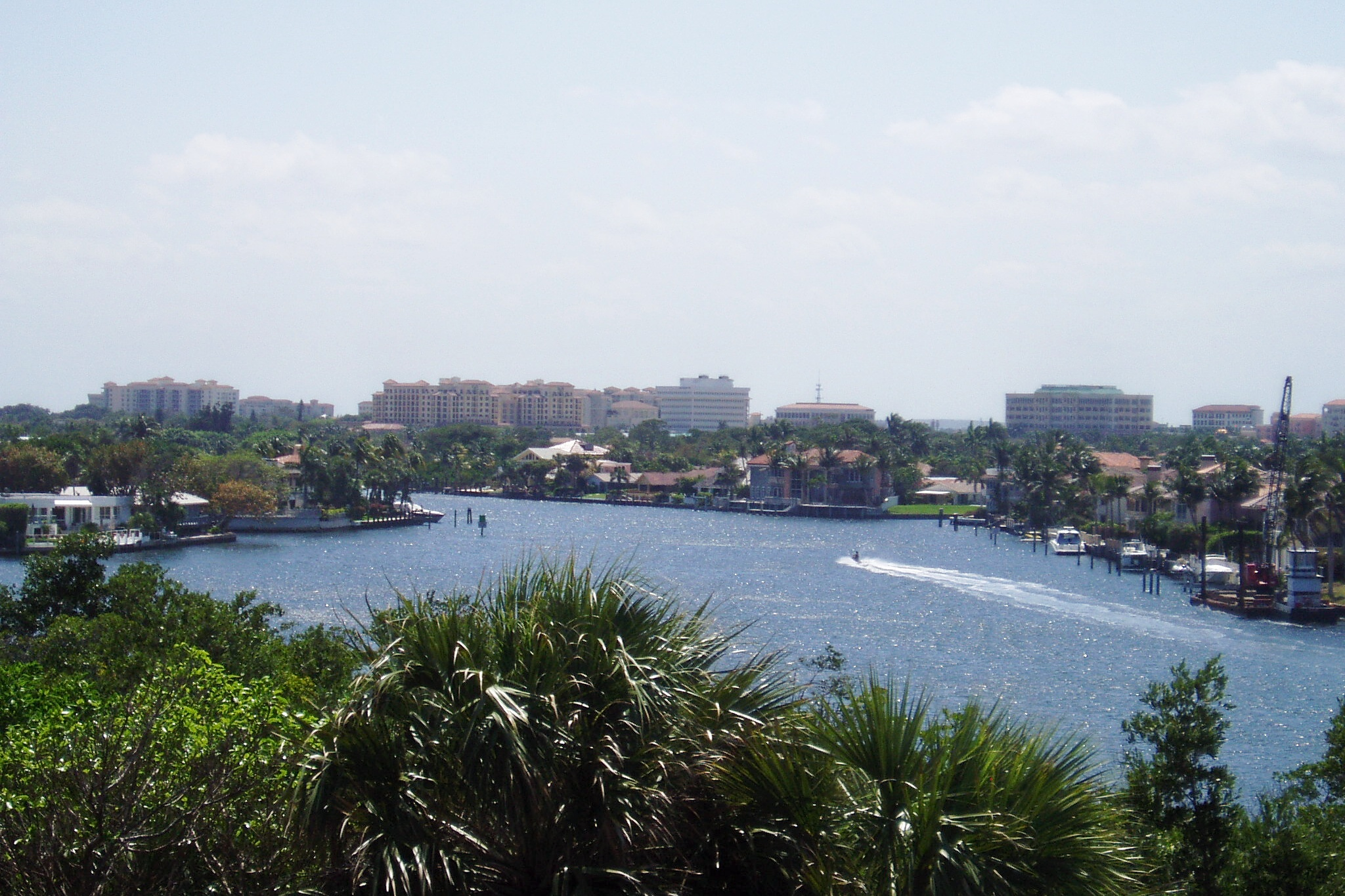
Boca Raton, Florida, is where Robert Stevens worked before his death.

In the wake of the 2001 bioterrorism attacks, Palm Beach County Attorney Richard D. Schuler represented the family of Bob Stevens — the first American to die from anthrax exposure after opening a letter at his workplace. Mr. Schuler filed suit against the U.S. Department of Defense, seeking accountability on behalf of the Stevens family and shining a national spotlight on the government's responsibility.

Maureen Stevens, wife of Robert Stevens, filed a $50 million lawsuit in 2003 against the government of the United States. In the lawsuit, Maureen Stevens claimed "that the government was negligent in failing to stop someone from working at an Army infectious disease lab from creating weapons-grade anthrax used in letters that killed five people and sickened 17 others." Ten years after filing the lawsuit, Maureen Stevens settled with the United States government for US$2.5 million. After Maureen and her lawyer settled with the government, Maureen's lawyer said, "Justice has been served."

== Context ==
The anthrax mailings that killed five people and sickened seventeen others came right after the September 11 terrorist attacks. Because they came immediately following 9/11, investigators initially suspected that Al Qaeda was also responsible for the anthrax attacks. However, it was soon discovered that the strain of anthrax used was connected to a military research laboratory in Maryland.

== Impact ==
Robert Stevens was the first anthrax victim to be killed in 25 years. The type of anthrax with which he was killed was rare and lethal. During the investigation, the FBI shut down the offices in which Stevens was employed to collect evidence of anthrax. Another thing that makes the death of Robert Stevens important is that at the time it was very rare for anthrax to be in the form of white powder. At the time experts believed that anthrax could be found in the soil, in sheep, in cattle, and in horses. The machines used to process mail as it came through the system caused anthrax spores to go into the air. Then, by cleaning those same machines, the anthrax spores spread even farther and onto other mail causing twenty two other people to become sick; two of whom died due to the exposure in the sorting office.

== Reactions ==
The main reaction to these events was fear that the deaths were the work of terrorists in the United States only a few weeks after the September 11 attacks, and the United States Postal System also became fearful as the letters containing anthrax were mailed through the postal service. Because of this fear, online sales of ciprofloxacin, an antibiotic used to treat anthrax, drastically went up. People purchasing the antibiotic were paying more than ten times the normal cost of the drug.

== See also ==
- List of journalists killed in the United States
