= Quizfest =

American teen magazine

QuizFest is a teenage magazine published on a quarterly basis. The first issue was released in the summer of 2004. It was started by Bauer Publishing, the United States division of the German firm Bauer Verlagsgruppe. American Media, Inc. acquired Bauer's US children's magazines in 2018. It is an entertainment magazine with quizzes, celebrity gossip, games and posters. The headquarters is in New York, NY.

== Circulation ==
Each issue of QuizFest has a circulation of 400,000 and remains on stands for about two months.
