= Globe (tabloid) =

American tabloid newspaper

- Chief content officer: Dylan Howard
- Categories: Tabloid
- Frequency: Weekly
- Total circulation: 271,424 (December 2011)
- Founder: Joe Azaria
- Founded: 1954 (as Midnight)
- Company: American Media, Inc.
- Based in: Boca Raton, Florida
- Language: English
- Website: globemagazine.com
- ISSN: 1094-6047

Globe is a supermarket tabloid based in Boca Raton, Florida. It covers politics, celebrity, human interest, and crime stories, largely employing sensationalist tabloid journalism. It originated in Montreal, Quebec, in 1954 as the Canadian tabloid Midnight.

== History ==
=== Midnight ===
The publication originated in Montreal, Quebec, as Midnight. Its first issue appeared on November 10, 1954. Founded by Joe Azaria, it was initially described as a bi-weekly publication devoted to Montreal nightlife.

Azaria, an Iraqi-born immigrant to Canada, had attempted to obtain work as a journalist before establishing his own publication. He founded Midnight with very limited capital, later recalling that he began with $14 and a $1,000 line of credit from a Montreal printer.

Although originally oriented toward Montreal nightlife, Midnight developed into a more general scandal and sensational-news tabloid. Its contents included celebrity gossip, crime, unusual human-interest stories and sensational reports, including stories concerning unidentified flying objects and other unusual subjects. The publication became known for taking relatively minor events or factual elements and presenting them through dramatic headlines and amplified narratives.

By the early 1960s, Midnight had moved well beyond its origins as a Montreal entertainment sheet and had become one of Canada's most prominent scandal tabloids. Contemporary coverage in Maclean's described Azaria as the publisher of one of the country's most sensational publications.

=== Expansion into the United States ===
During the 1960s, Midnight increasingly oriented itself toward the much larger American tabloid market. Its distribution expanded well beyond Canada, and the publication developed a substantial readership in the United States. By the late 1960s, much of its circulation was reportedly outside Canada, placing it in competition with American supermarket tabloids such as the National Enquirer.

The paper's editorial style also evolved as it pursued this larger market. Rather than concentrating primarily on Montreal personalities and nightlife, it increasingly published sensational crime, celebrity and human-interest stories intended for a North American readership. This development paralleled a broader trend among some Canadian tabloids during the 1960s and 1970s toward cultivating American readers.

Azaria sold Midnight in 1969. Under subsequent ownership, its expansion into the American supermarket-taboid market continued.

=== From Midnight to Globe ===
The publication was subsequently acquired by publisher Mike Rosenbloom. By the 1970s, the company that published it had expanded into the supermarket-tabloid business and also acquired other titles.

In 1978, Midnight was renamed Midnight Globe, reflecting the name of its publisher, Globe Communications. The title was subsequently shortened to Globe. By this point, the publication had completed its transformation from a Montreal nightlife paper into a North American supermarket tabloid.

By 1990, Globe was part of Montreal-based Globe International Publishing, which also published the National Examiner and Sun. The three titles had a combined circulation exceeding 2.5 million. Globe alone averaged approximately 1.33 million copies during the six months ending December 1989. The Los Angeles Times described Globe as having originated as the Montreal local entertainment publication Midnight before developing into one of the major publications sold at American supermarket checkout counters.

In 1990, British publisher Robert Maxwell agreed to acquire Globe, National Examiner and Sun from Globe International Publishing.

In 1999, American Media bought parent Globe Communications.

On April 18, 2019, American Media announced an agreement to sell Globe, the National Enquirer and the National Examiner to Hudson Group owner James Cohen.

=== Controversies ===
In the early 1990s, Globe drew criticism for publishing the name of the woman who accused William Kennedy Smith of rape, at a time when most American news organizations did not identify alleged victims of sexual assault.

The tabloid also became known for publishing material about the private lives of celebrities. In 1997 it published transcripts relating to Frank Gifford's extramarital affair at a New York City hotel. The affair was orchestrated by the Globe, which hired Suzen Johnson, a former flight attendant, to seduce Gifford while being recorded. Johnson was paid between $75,000 and $125,000 to lure Gifford to a hotel room where hidden recording equipment was installed. After two attempts, Johnson tricked Gifford into the room on April 30 and May 1, 1997. The story of the affair was published by the Globe in May of that year.

In November 1995, Globe published autopsy photographs of Selena Quintanilla-Pérez. The issue was withdrawn or discarded by some retailers in South Texas, where the singer had a large following.

In 1997, the tabloid published autopsy photographs of JonBenét Ramsey. The publication prompted objections in Boulder, Colorado, and some local retailers removed the issue from sale.

In 2001, Globe was among the publications produced at the American Media, Inc. offices in Boca Raton, Florida, that were affected by the 2001 anthrax attacks. A photo editor for its sister publication Sun died after exposure to anthrax, and the building was subsequently closed for several years.

In 2003, Globe published the name and photograph of the woman who accused Kobe Bryant of sexual assault. The decision was controversial because most American news organizations did not identify alleged victims of sex crimes. Editor-in-chief Jeffrey Rodack defended the decision in comments published by the Poynter Institute.

In June 2010, Globe published photographs of Gary Coleman on his deathbed and promoted claims that the former child actor had been murdered.

In 2013, the publication campaigned in support of the revival of the television soap operas All My Children and One Life to Live.

By 2017, Globe was being published from American Media's headquarters in Boca Raton. Dylan Howard, then chief content officer of American Media's celebrity group, oversaw the company's celebrity publications.

Compared with some other supermarket tabloids, Globe has often devoted more space to political, crime and general-interest stories alongside celebrity coverage.
