= Radar Online =

American entertainment and gossip website

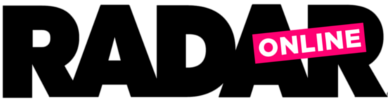
- Website type: Celebrity news
- Available in: English
- Owner: Empire Media Group
- Website: radaronline.com
- Commercial: Yes
- Registration: Optional
- Launched: 2003 (print magazine); (ceased in 2008); 2009 (website)

Radar Online is an American entertainment and gossip website. The print magazine Radar was founded by Maer Roshan and first published in September 2003, with the website RadarOnline.com launching in 2005. After the print magazine shuttered in 2008, the website was acquired by American Media Inc. (now A360 Media) in 2008, where Dylan Howard oversaw the publication at various times from 2010 to 2020. In 2021, Empire Media Group acquired the site from A360 Media and returned control to Howard.

== History ==
=== Print magazine and website (2003-2008) ===
Radar published articles on entertainment, fashion, politics, and human interest and was founded and edited by Maer Roshan in September 2003 with two test issues. The magazine relaunched in 2005 with help from investors and family members, including Daily News owner Mort Zuckerman and pre-scandal Jeffrey Epstein, but folded again after three issues. While the official statement blamed "the current economic environment", some sources speculated it was linked to Zuckerman learning of the Epstein investigation.

In 2006, the magazine was revived again, this time with backing from billionaire Ron Burkle and Yusef Jackson, son of Jesse Jackson. It was shut down again, in 2008 but was quickly acquired by American Media Inc. and Jackson's Integrity Media.

=== American Media Inc. ownership (2008-2021) ===
On October 24, 2008, American Media Inc. (AMI) announced a partnership with Integrity Multimedia Company to acquire RadarOnline.com, forming a new company called Radar Online LLC. David Perel, Executive Vice President of AMI News, was named managing editor. When the site relaunched, all articles previously published by Radar Online were erased from the site.

In 2010, Dylan Howard joined RadarOnline.com as Senior Executive Editor. After a brief stint leading Celebuzz.com, he returned in 2013 as editor-in-chief. His time at AMI was marked by periodic controversy and leadership changes. He was named Chief Content Officer in 2017, but his contract was not renewed in 2020.

In August 2020, Radar Online experienced deep staff cuts due to declining advertising sales during the COVID-19 pandemic, with the site becoming "practically moribund" with only sporadic postings.

=== Empire Media Group ownership (2021-present) ===
On March 25, 2021, Dylan Howard announced that his newly formed Empire Media Group had acquired RadarOnline.com from a360 Media. 40 staff members were hired to revitalize the site, including Editor-in-Chied Ryan Naumann, formerly of TMZ.
