= Chatham Asset Management =

American private equity firm

Chatham Asset Management LLC
- Type: Private
- Genre: Private Equity
- Founded: 2000; 26 years ago
- Founder: Anthony Melchiorre
- Headquarters: Chatham Borough, New Jersey, United States
- Key people: Larry Buchalter
- Website: www.chathamasset.com

Chatham Asset Management LLC is an American private equity firm, founded by Anthony Melchiorre in 2000, with a large foothold in newspapers and tabloids, headquartered in Chatham Borough, New Jersey, United States. The company holds a controlling interest in Postmedia, A360media, McClatchy, and RR Donnelley. Chatham's key principal is Larry Buchalter.

According to a 2018 article in Fortune, Chatham is known for its close ties to the Republican Party. Chatham has a reputation for hard-edged business tactics. In 2016, the Financial Industry Regulatory Authority opened a review of Seaport Global Securities that included an examination of its relationship with Chatham.

In 2023, Chatham and Melchiorre were charged by the U.S. Securities and Exchange Commission with "improper trading of certain fixed income securities", in relation to client trades of AMI stock. They agreed to pay over $19.3 million collectively in fines.

== Acquisition and layoffs at newspaper chains ==
In October 2016, Chatham quietly acquired a two-thirds controlling stake in Postmedia, Canada's largest newspaper chain, by exchanging debt owed to them for majority ownership. When Chatham acquired majority shares in Postmedia Network, even some of Postmedia's employees were not aware of the change in ownership. Postmedia's financial news platform described its debt restructuring making mention of Chatham as one of the investors. According to Postmedia Network's 2020 Financial Report, as of November 30, 2019, Chatham, an American media conglomerate which also owns American Media, Inc. owned 62,313,749, or 66%, of Postmedia's shares, which challenged the assumption that PostMedia was Canadian controlled. According to The New York Times, since acquiring Postmedia, Chatham reduced the workforce, closed newspapers across Canada, decreased salaries and benefits, and consolidated editorial operations.

In September 2020, Chatham purchased substantially all of the McClatchy newspaper chain out of bankruptcy. McClatchy at the time operated 30 newspapers in 14 states across the United States. In the years following the purchase, McClatchy repeatedly laid off journalists and reduced coverage at many of their papers.
