= Shape (magazine) =

Fitness magazine

- A cover of Shape, featuring Ashley Tisdale, January 2009
- Editor: Elizabeth Goodman Artis
- Former editors: Tara Kraft
- Frequency: 10 issues per year
- Total circulation: 1,568,055 (December 2011)
- Founded: 1981
- Company: People Inc.
- Country: United States
- Based in: Woodland Hills, Los Angeles, California
- Language: English
- Website: www.shape.com
- ISSN: 0744-5121

Shape (stylized in all caps) is an American monthly fitness magazine started by Weider Publications in 1981, founded by Christine MacIntyre (a pioneer in women's free weight fitness) and became the number one women's fitness magazine. At that time, Weider Enterprises consisted primarily of the bodybuilding magazine Muscle & Fitness. Joe Weider and Christine MacIntyre had differing views of how to present Shape, Weider endorsing a less journalistic and more commercial approach to articles, MacIntyre endorsing a more academic, doctor-based magazine.

Weider also endorsed a sexier approach to editorial while MacIntyre endorsed a healthier look for women, eschewing sexiness in the models and the copy. MacIntyre largely won that battle, editing a magazine that required that every byline have an advanced medical degree, that cover models should look healthy rather than sexy, and that sexist language be avoided. Christine MacIntyre was the editor-in-chief until her death in 1987.

Weider was purchased by American Media in 2002. A German version of Shape is available in Germany, Austria and Switzerland. The magazine is also edited in Romania.

Elizabeth Goodman Artis was named Editor-in-Chief in 2014 and held the position until 2021.

On January 28, 2015, it was reported that Shape would be acquired by Meredith Corp. and Fitness, published by the company, would cease publication in May 2015 and be combined with it.

== Content ==
Sections in the magazine include Features & Cover Stories, Shape Your Life, Look Great, Live Healthy, Get Fit, Eat Right, You In Shape, and In Every Issue, which includes From the Editor's Desk, Contributors, Readers Speak Out, The Hot List and Fit & Famous.

Other topics include sex, mind/spirit, beauty, travel, fashion, work, home and style.
