= Dylan Howard =

Entertainment journalist (born 1982)

- Born: 19 January 1982 (age 44); Geelong, Australia
- Citizenship: United States
- Education: Deakin University (BA)
- Occupations: Entertainment and Sports Journalist, Author, Producer

Dylan Howard (born 19 January 1982) is an entertainment journalist and media executive. He is best known for his work as editor-in-chief of the National Enquirer tabloid between 2014 and 2020, a period in which he oversaw a number of scandals involving powerful figures.

He is the CEO of Empire Media Group, Inc which owns 12 digital and print brands. He is also the chairman and CEO of Pantheon Media Group which publishes Grazia around the world. Previously, Howard was the editor-in-chief and chief content officer at American Media, Inc. (AMI) from 2013 to 2020. He is known for spearheading some of the most explosive celebrity exposes in America's entertainment industry.

Howard has developed shows for Investigation Discovery, TLC, and REELZ. He is the author of seven books covering news, true-crime, and entertainment and has produced award-winning podcasts in partnership with Endeavor, including Fatal Voyage: The Mysterious Death of Natalie Wood and Epstein: Devil In The Darkness.

== Early life ==
The younger of two brothers, Howard, grew up in the coastal city of Geelong, Victoria. Howard began his studies at Western Heights College and RMIT University before moving to Deakin. He holds a BA in journalism from Deakin University in Australia.

Howard started his journalism career as a teenager in 1999, writing for The Geelong Advertiser, a daily newspaper circulating in Victoria, Australia, and the Bellarine Peninsula. He wrote an opinion column through 2008 for the Saturday edition, Sports Section, titled "Howard's Way".

Howard left the Geelong Advertiser and worked for a brief stint in New York for celebrity photo agency Big Pictures, owned by Geelong native, Australian media personality and politician Darryn Lyons. He returned to Australia and worked for TNT (formerly Southern Cross News), a television station based in Launceston, Tasmania. He was also a sportscaster for Australian radio stations, SEN 1116 and 3AW.

== Career ==
=== Seven News ===
Howard joined Seven News (7NEWS) in 2004 as a sports reporter and producer. His primary reporting focus was on the Australian Rules Football League (AFL), but during the summer months, he would present the Melbourne evening sports bulletin. Howard's 2007 report, revealing the impending sacking of an Australian football coach, garnered him local acclaim. In 2008, Howard published a controversial AFL story that involved paying for and publishing two footballers’ medical records and the confidential details of their drug use. The story prompted an investigation, and neither the network nor Howard was charged. Howard left the network shortly after – when his contract was not renewed.

=== Arrival in United States ===
In January 2009, Howard moved to New York to head Crocmedia's U.S. arm and wrote for various publications including Hello, Woman's Day, OK!, Men's Style, Ralph Magazine, In Touch, and The Sunday Mail's Celebs on Sunday. In 2009, Howard reported for Reuters in New York City.

=== American Media, Inc. ===
In 2010, he joined RadarOnline.com and Star in Los Angeles as its senior executive editor. In July 2010, Howard broke the Mel Gibson audiotape scandal after obtaining the expletive-laden recordings between Gibson and Oksana Grigorieva.

In early 2012, Howard joined BuzzMedia as editor-in-chief of Celebuzz.com. Just over a year later, he returned as editor-in-chief of RadarOnline.com in April 2013. By 2014, the site's parent company, American Media, Inc.(AMI), named Howard editor-in-chief of the National Enquirer in addition to his role as editorial director of Radar.

In 2017, the Associated Press reported on an inquiry conducted by AMI in 2012 about a sexual harassment allegation toward Howard. AMI hired an outside investigator to look into two employees’ claims about Howard's behavior. The lawyer, Cam Stracher, said the investigation did not show serious wrongdoing. American Media supported Howard through the allegations.

Howard rose through the ranks to become vice president and chief content officer at AMI. He left the company on 31 March 2020, after his contract expired. During his tenure, he oversaw Us Weekly, OK!, Star, In Touch, Life & Style, RadarOnline, and the National Enquirer and its U.K. edition, Globe. He oversaw AMI's acquisitions of Us Weekly from Wenner and Bauer Media.

=== Empire Media ===
On 6 October 2020 Howard was announced as the U.S. publisher and chief executive officer of global fashion media brand, Grazia. On 25 March 2021, Howard announced he had formed the media conglomerate, Empire Media Group, Inc., based in New York City, and had purchased RadarOnline.com and OKmagazine.com from his former employer, American Media. He also announced the acquisition of several other publications including; Yoga MagBook, How It Works, and All About Space amongst others. According to Howard, the company is privately owned without investors.

In May 2021, Grazia launched in Asia and in the Hamptons under Howard's Pantheon Media Group. Empire acquired Knewz in fall 2021.

== Publications ==
In August 2019, Howard signed an exclusive deal to publish his true crime titles with Skyhorse and Start Publishing.

- Epstein: Dead Men Tell No Tales (3 December 2019)
- Aaron Hernandez’s Killing Fields (5 November 2019)
- Diana: Case Solved (17 September 2019)
- The Last Charles Manson Tapes: Evil Lives Beyond the Grave (26 November 2019)
- Billion Dollar Hollywood Heist (24 March 2020)
- Royals at War (30 June 2020)
- BAD: An Unprecedented Investigation into the Michael Jackson Cover-Up (7 July 2020)
- COVID-19: The Greatest Cover-Up in History—From Wuhan to the White House (5 October 2020)

== Filmography ==
Howard appeared in, and executive produced the 3-part mini-series "JonBenet: An American Murder Mystery" on Investigation Discovery and was the most-watched series in the history of the network (2016). Howard also executive produced "National Enquirer Investigates," "Casey Anthony: An American Murder Mystery," "The Kitty Kelley Files," and others. He has also made guest appearances on Dr. Phil, Entertainment Tonight, and Good Morning America.

== Audio ==
Howard executive produced and created the podcast Fatal Voyage: The Mysterious Death of Natalie Wood, a Webby award-winning investigation into the actress’ death. During its opening week, the podcast ranked No. 2 on the iTunes Charts and was one of Apple Podcasts' Most Downloaded New Shows of 2018. Howard also executive produced, The Killing of Marilyn Monroe, Killing JonBenet Ramsay: The Final Suspects, and Epstein: Devil in The Darkness amongst others.

== Awards ==
Howard was named the 2011 Entertainment Journalist of the Year at the Los Angeles Press Club's National Entertainment Journalism Awards (NEJA). In awarding him the top national honor, they also noted: "In the world of celebrity and entertainment news, even mainstream media couldn’t ignore exclusive stories broken under Dylan Howard’s tenure as senior executive editor of RadarOnline.com."

The Los Angeles Times said of Howard that he "transform(ed) America’s tabloid culture."

He is a twelve-time NEJA winner and 14-time finalist. He has previously won L.A. Press Club awards for online news reporting—Mel Gibson audiotapes—and investigative journalism, for exposing a secret Hollywood poker ring involving A-List actors Tobey Maguire, Ben Affleck, Matt Damon, and Leonardo DiCaprio. He has been nominated 11 times for various L.A. Press Club awards.

== Controversies ==
=== Jeff Bezos ===
On 7 February 2019, Jeff Bezos accused Howard, The National Enquirer, AMI and its CEO David Pecker of attempted blackmail after the Enquirer exposed his extra-marital affair and released his text messages. Bezos published an email Howard had sent to his attorney describing various intimate photographs, including a "below the belt selfie" they had in their possession. In the blog post, Bezos refused to negotiate with AMI. AMI attorney Jon Fine followed the email with demands that Bezos cease an ongoing investigation of AMI's previous release of Bezos' private text messages. American Media Inc., said it "acted lawfully in the reporting of the story of Mr. Bezos. At the time of the recent allegations made by Mr. Bezos, it was in good faith negotiations to resolve all matters with him."

Bloomberg suggested the Bezos scandal could upend a 2018 non-prosecution agreement the publisher of the National Enquirer struck with federal prosecutors in New York over its illegal aid to the Trump campaign. Under the 20 Sept. agreement, the tabloid publisher was supposed to refrain from all illegal activity for a three-year period. It was initially reported that Howard was a party to a September 2018 non-prosecution agreement with Southern District of New York federal prosecutors. The Washington Post later corrected its reporting, stating Howard never admitted he, "bought and buried a story to influence the presidential election in favor of Donald Trump" and it was unclear if Howard was ever investigated for that offense.

=== Donald Trump ===
In the mid-2010s, adult film actress Stormy Daniels and Playboy Playmate Karen McDougal received payments in exchange for not publicly discussing their sexual encounters with then-presidential candidate Donald Trump. The settlements drew Howard into the Trump campaign expense controversy as his employer, AMI., had facilitated one of the payments. The New York Times reported on 23 August 2018 that Howard was cooperating with federal investigators examining hush payments made by Michael Cohen to the two women on behalf of President Donald Trump.

Ronan Farrow claims in his book Catch and Kill: Lies, Spies, and a Conspiracy to Protect Predators that American Media, Inc. and the National Enquirer shredded sensitive Trump-related documents held in a top-secret safe on orders from then-editor-in-chief Howard the same day a reporter from the Wall Street Journal asked for a comment for a story about how AMI paid $150,000 to Karen McDougal to keep her story about having an affair with Trump quiet before the election.

Howard has never commented publicly on Farrow's book. However, he took legal action against Farrow and his publisher Little Brown Book Group Limited. Howard retained famed libel lawyer Paul Tweed, who disputed the allegations. "It is for the publishers and the distributors to satisfy themselves as to the truth of what they publish and our client has made his position absolutely clear and will not be deterred from the facts by the leaking of correspondence to the media," he said in a statement.

While testifying during Trump's New York criminal trial in April 2024, David Pecker stated that Howard got word of Karen McDougal's allegation in June 2016, and how he then sent Howard to California to interview McDougal, who would ultimately give her story to the National Enquirer for a sum of $150,000. However, Stormy Daniels' lawyer Keith Davidson stated during court testimony that Howard was "washing his hands" of having a direct role in the $130,000 hush money payment to Daniels and would instead encourage Davidson to reach out to Cohen. Text messages also revealed Howard's reluctance to buy Daniels' story, telling Davidson things such as "Waive the white people. It's over" and how he believed that Trump was "f**ked already.” However, Davidson would acknowledge that a comment he texted to Howard on the November 2016 election night, where he claimed ""What have we done?", was a "sort of gallow humors" way of recognizing their activities which "may have assisted the presidential campaign." More text messages also revealed how Howard and Davidson had conversations concerning hush money payments for McDougal, who at the time of her allegation was also represented by Davidson. A text message which was also shown during the trial revealed that Cohen informed Howard that he was making the catch and kill hush money payment on Trump's behalf.

=== Harvey Weinstein ===
Howard received media attention for providing Harvey Weinstein with information about Rose McGowan, an actress who made a sexual harassment claim directed toward Weinstein. Howard provided this information to Weinstein at the time Weinstein was denying any harassment claims and did so to maintain a strong working relationship with Weinstein due to "mutual business interests" a lawyer for Howard said. Howard stated that he pursued Weinstein's request "as a courtesy" but refused to publish any material about the subject, resisting each of Weinstein's "repeated efforts" to have Howard publish favourable stories about him or unfavourable stories about his accusers.

On 7 March 2018, Howard successfully sued Nine Network's 60 Minutes after they unlawfully trespassed on private property and attempted to question him about the Weinstein story in his New York office lobby.

=== Charlie Sheen ===
On 22 April 2016, issue of The Hollywood Reporter, Howard wrote a firsthand account of how he exposed that actor Charlie Sheen was HIV positive. The magazine wrote: "Dylan Howard was the volatile actor's confidant until the National Enquirer editor began investigating rumors that Sheen was HIV positive. Howard recounted Sheen threatening him on a telephone call and said in the months after publication, he had to employ personal security. Howard said he published the article despite the risk to his life, "because it was the truth."

=== Medical records ===
The medical records of two players from an AFL club were claimed to have been found in the gutter outside a clinic by a woman. After allegedly attempting to return the documents to the clinic and finding that the gates were locked, the woman began to call all the media outlets in Melbourne, offering the documents as a "public service." Her asking price was A$3,000. Channel 7 purchased the documents and around 4:15 on Friday, 24 August 2007, Channel 7 began reporting that it had a "huge story" related to AFL and drugs. At 6 pm AEST Howard went on air and named the club that the two players played for. A court injunction was sought to suppress the name and club mentioned in the records and was granted by Justice Kim Hargrave of the Supreme Court of Victoria.

Later on 24 August, during half time on Channel 7's Friday Night Football, Howard participated in an on-air interview, conducted by Tim Watson where he claimed that after contacting the AFL, it had given Howard "approval" to go to air with the story. This interview went live, via Fox Sports to New South Wales and Queensland and on the CCTV at the Telstra Dome, but was not in the program that aired on the Seven Network during the delayed coverage into Victoria, South Australia or Western Australia after Howard admitted he inadvertently misspoke.

Howard, on Tuesday 28 August 2007, went on 3AW during the Sport's Today program and explained to Caroline Wilson that his comments on Friday night had been misinterpreted and that he had "apologised to those who misunderstood that at the time". The AFL CEO, Andrew Demetriou, then responded to Howard's interview on 3AW, saying that "It's mischievous, and we have asked him to apologise, given that it went to air in two states, and all Dylan Howard had to do was apologise. We will not be misrepresented to people about the AFL supporting a story that we've already said publicly we find obscene, abhorrent, the route of gutter journalism".

=== Drugs in sports ===
On 1 August 2007, Australian Football League star, Jason Akermanis wrote an article for Melbourne's NewsCorp paper, the Herald Sun, stating that he 'felt' that his direct opponent in previous games seemed able to run faster and recover better. The implication was that this player was using performance-enhancing drugs. Jason didn't name the player in his article, but it prompted an investigation by ASADA, the Australian Sports Anti-doping Authority. Days later, Howard, who to date has yet to name his source, revealed that the player who Jason was referring to and was being probed was Michael Braun a player for the West Coast Eagles. Akermanis later apologised to Braun.

In response, Howard attacked the AFL in an opinion column in the Geelong Advertiser, accusing the AFL of being "vicious political animals" and stating, "some reporters and commentators feel they have been deliberately targeted, not because they crossed an ethical line, but because they refused to toe the line." Journalist Adam Schwab said, "Many in the community will no doubt be disappointed that the only hard line taken by the AFL is towards journalists, and not the drug takers."

=== Violence ===
While on assignment in Ireland, broke the story that Australian Football League star Brendan Fevola had been in a fight with that pub's bartender while he was a member of the All Australian team visiting Ireland for the International Rules Series Seven News purchased the video tape from a pub in Galway, Ireland, and broadcast it back into Australia.

== Personal life ==
Born in Australia, he would later take up residency in the United States. In December 2017, Howard purchased a house in East Hampton, NY valued at $1.1million USD. On April 22, 2024, former American Media Inc. head David Pecker revealed that Howard, who was considered to be a potential witness in Donald's Trump's New York criminal case, was now living in Australia and also suffering from a "spinal condition" which makes it impossible for him to travel internationally.
