= Sun (supermarket tabloid) =

Newspapers published in the Southern United States stubs

- Sun cover (June 7, 2004)
- Categories: American Media Inc.
- Founder: Mike Rosenbloom
- First issue: 1983
- Final issue: 2012
- Company: American Media, Inc.
- Country: USA
- Based in: Boca Raton, Florida
- Language: English

Sun was a supermarket tabloid owned by American Media, Inc. It ceased publication after the issue bearing a July 2, 2012, cover date.

Its contents often came under question and widely regarded as "sensationalistic writing." Since a 1992 invasion of privacy case, a small-print disclaimer printed beneath the masthead warned readers to "suspend belief for the sake of enjoyment."

The paper was founded by Mike Rosenbloom, then-publisher of Globe Magazine, in 1983 as a competitor to Weekly World News, and its early contents reflected the same kind of imaginative journalism. When both papers were consolidated under American Media Inc. ownership in 1999, Sun's content came to specialize in recurring stories on Bible prophecy, Nostradamus, global warming, the apocalypse, epidemics, and future war. Sun also featured health articles dealing with miracle cures of diseases such as chronic pain and arthritis, as well as numerous "strange but true" articles from across the country—in fact, the strange but true stories made up the bulk of the paper's content, although they were almost never featured on the front page.

Following the 2007 discontinuation of Weekly World News as a separate publication, Sun began printing a small "pull-out" insert of Weekly World News stories and columns.

Sun photo editor Robert Stevens became the first victim of the 2001 anthrax attacks. He died as a result of a letter sent to the offices of American Media, the parent company of Sun, The National Enquirer, and other supermarket tabloids.
