= National Enquirer =

American tabloid newspaper

- Editor in Chief: Dylan Howard
- Categories: Tabloid
- Frequency: Weekly
- Total circulation: 265,000 (2018)
- First issue: 1926; 100 years ago
- Company: McClatchy, formerly A360 Media, LLC
- Country: United States
- Based in: New York City
- Language: English
- Website: nationalenquirer.com
- ISSN: 1056-3482

The National Enquirer is an American tabloid newspaper. Founded in 1926, the newspaper has undergone a number of changes over the years. The National Enquirer openly acknowledges that it pays sources for tips (checkbook journalism), a common practice in tabloid journalism that results in conflicts of interest. It has also been embroiled in several controversies related to its catch and kill practices and allegations of blackmail. It has struggled with declining circulation figures because of competition from other glossy tabloid publications.

In May 2014, American Media, Inc. (AMI) announced a decision to shift the headquarters of the National Enquirer from Florida, where it had been located since 1971, back to New York City, where it originally began as The New York Enquirer in 1926. On April 10, 2019, Chatham Asset Management, which had acquired control of 80 percent of AMI's stock, forced AMI to sell the National Enquirer. On April 18, 2019, AMI agreed to sell the National Enquirer to Hudson Group. Pending bankruptcy, Chatham would again become the majority shareholder of the paper.

== History ==
=== 1926–1990s ===
In 1926, William Griffin, a protégé of William Randolph Hearst, founded the paper as The New York Evening Enquirer, a Sunday afternoon broadsheet newspaper distributed throughout New York City, using money lent to Griffin by Hearst. It made its debut on September 19, 1926. As partial payment of his loan, Hearst asked Griffin to use the Enquirer as a proving ground for new ideas. Hearst took the ideas that worked in his successful publications; the less successful ideas stayed with the Enquirer, and as a result the Enquirer's sales never soared. During the 1930s and 1940s, it became a voice for isolationism and pro-fascist propaganda. The paper was indicted along with Griffin under the Smith Act for sedition by a grand jury in 1942 for subverting the morale of US troops through Griffin's editorials against US military involvement in World War II. The charges were later dropped.

By 1952, three years after Griffin's death, the paper's circulation had fallen to 17,000 copies a week; it was then purchased by Generoso Pope Jr., the son of Generoso Pope, the founder of Il Progresso, New York's Italian language daily newspaper. Pope's son Paul alleged that Luciano crime family boss Frank Costello provided Pope the money for the purchase in exchange for the Enquirer's promise to list lottery numbers and to refrain from any mention of Mafia activities.

In 1953, Pope revamped the format from a broadsheet to a sensationalist tabloid. The paper's editorial content became so salacious that New York mayor Robert F. Wagner Jr. forced Pope to resign from the city's Board of Higher Education in 1954. In 1957, Pope changed the name of the newspaper to The National Enquirer and changed its scope to national stories of sex and scandal. Pope worked tirelessly in the 1950s and 1960s to increase the circulation and broaden the tabloid's appeal. In the late 1950s and through most of the 1960s, the publication was known for its gory and unsettling headlines and stories such as: "I Cut Out Her Heart and Stomped on It" (September 8, 1963) and "Mom Boiled Her Baby and Ate Her" (1962). At this time the paper was sold on newsstands and in drugstores only. Pope stated he got the idea for the format and these gory stories from seeing people congregate around auto accidents. By 1966, circulation had risen to one million.

Pope pioneered the practice of selling magazines at supermarket checkouts. To gain access to the supermarkets, Pope completely changed the format of the paper in late 1967 by dropping all the gore and violence to focus on more benign topics like celebrities, the occult and UFOs. In 1971, Pope moved the headquarters from New York to Lantana, Florida. In 1974, The National Enquirer began running Bill Hoest's Bumper Snickers, a cartoon series about cars and drivers, collected by Signet into a paperback reprint two years later. The death of Elvis Presley was the first show business news story that provided the Enquirer with ongoing opportunities to investigate offshoots of the breaking story, as luridly documented in the tabloid's own in house news sheet The Post Script. Items that followed up on Presley's death included a color photograph of his body in an open coffin, a description of nine-year-old Lisa Presley's shock and grief over the loss of her father and reports of his pharmaceutical drug abuse, autopsy results and malpractice claims against the doctor who had supplied him with the drugs. These reports appeared in nearly every issue of the Enquirer for more than two years.

During most of the 1970s and 1980s, The National Enquirer sponsored the placement of the largest decorated Christmas tree in the world at its Lantana, Florida headquarters in what became an annual tradition. A tree was shipped in mid-autumn from the Pacific Northwest by rail and off-loaded by crane onto the adjacent base of The National Enquirer property. Every night during the Christmas season, thousands of visitors would come to see the tree. This would grow into one of South Florida's most celebrated and spectacular events. Although tremendously expensive, this was Pope's "Pet Project" and his "Christmas present" to the local community. The tradition ended when he died in 1988. By this time, The National Enquirer's parent company American Media had acquired publications and companies including Weekly World News, and Distribution Services, Inc. The surviving owners, including Pope's widow Lois, sold the company to a partnership of Macfadden Publishing and Boston Ventures for $412 million. Soon after, the company bought the publication's main competition, Star magazine, from Rupert Murdoch. The combined interests were controlled by a newly formed company, American Media, Inc. (AMI). In 1999, the paper relocated south again, but this time only 15 miles to Boca Raton, Florida.

=== 2000s ===
==== Anthrax attack ====
In 2001 in Boca Raton, Florida, Bob Stevens—a photo editor at Sun, a sister publication under the National Enquirer's parent company AMI—was exposed to a letter with anthrax spores and became the first person to die as a result of the 2001 anthrax attacks. The entire AMI office complex in Boca Raton was closed down and remained fenced off for two years after the attack; AMI moved its headquarters to another building in Boca Raton.

==== John Edwards story ====
After the National Enquirer, led by editor-in-chief David Perel, investigated John Edwards for 18 months it proved that he was having an affair with Rielle Hunter. The Enquirer followed with exclusives including a photo of Hunter pregnant. In August 2008, in an interview with ABC News, former presidential candidate John Edwards admitted to having an extramarital affair with Rielle Hunter but denied fathering her child. Edwards had made false denials of the affair which was first reported by the National Enquirer. In October 2007, the publication ran a story about the 2006 affair with Hunter, a filmmaker hired by the Edwards political team, although Edwards dismissed the story as "completely untrue, ridiculous" and "false." In July 2008, the publication ran an article claiming to have caught the former North Carolina senator visiting Hunter and their alleged illegitimate child at a hotel in Los Angeles. Fox News interviewed an unnamed security guard who claimed to have witnessed a confrontation between Edwards and the tabloid's members of staff. Edwards later admitted that he was the father of Hunter's child, after the Enquirer ran a photo of Edwards with the baby.

In 2010, there was speculation that the Enquirer might receive a Pulitzer Prize for its investigation of Edwards. Donald Trump said that the paper should be "respected" for its investigation, and questioned why it was not given the award. The San Francisco Examiner wrote, "It galls most mainstream newspaper editors that a tawdry tabloid could be considered for their most vaunted prize. It's like nominating a porn flick for an Oscar."

==== Sarah Palin story ====
The National Enquirer claimed to have an exclusive account of the pregnancy of Bristol Palin, the daughter of Sarah Palin, then governor of Alaska and Republican candidate for vice president in the 2008 election:

The Republican governor's announcement about her daughter's pregnancy came hours after The Enquirer informed her representatives and family members of Levi Johnston, the father of Bristol's child, that we were aware of the pregnancy and were going to break the news. In a preemptive strike Palin released the news, creating political shockwaves.

The title published an allegation that Palin had an affair with her husband's business partner, Brad Hanson. Answering John McCain's threat of a lawsuit, a spokesman for the National Enquirer, in a statement to The Huffington Post, declared:

The National Enquirer's coverage of a vicious war within Sarah Palin's extended family includes several newsworthy revelations, including the resulting incredible charge of an affair plus details of family strife when the Governor's daughter revealed her pregnancy. Following our John Edwards exclusives, our political reporting has obviously proven to be more detail-oriented than the McCain campaign's vetting process. Despite the McCain camp's attempts to control press coverage they find unfavorable, the Enquirer will continue to pursue news on both sides of the political spectrum.

==== Murder of Ennis Cosby ====
The Enquirer offered a $100,000 reward for the arrest and conviction of the person who murdered Ennis Cosby, son of Bill Cosby. The paper received a credible tip, which it passed along to LAPD, which converted the tip into an arrest and conviction. David Perel's coverage of the O.J. Simpson case was referred to by The New York Times as the "bible of the case." Perel was editor in chief when the paper's investigative unit, formed under him, discovered and published that Jesse Jackson had fathered a love child during his marriage. In the Cosby case, the LA police, at a press conference, credited the Enquirer with solving the case, saying: "We have just arrested a suspect for the murder of Ennis Cosby going on information we are very confident about and this is in great part due to help from The National Enquirer." David Perel was again the Enquirer editor responsible for offering reward money that led to police solving the murder.

=== 2010s ===
==== Ted Cruz and Donald Trump ====
The National Enquirer enthusiastically endorsed Donald Trump for the 2016 presidential election and published numerous stories promoting his candidacy and denigrating his opponents. During the Republican presidential primaries in March 2016, the title ran a story alleging that "political operatives" were investigating whether candidate Ted Cruz, a U.S. senator from Texas, engaged in extramarital affairs. Cruz denied it and said that Trump had used his connections to persuade the Enquirer to publish the story. Trump denied involvement.

The National Enquirer ran another story in April 2016, suggesting that Cruz's father, Rafael Cruz, knew JFK assassin Lee Harvey Oswald and worked with Oswald in New Orleans a few months before the assassination. Trump publicly discussed this story on May 3, 2016, falsely saying to Brian Kilmeade of Fox News that "His father was with Lee Harvey Oswald prior to Oswald's being — you know, shot. I mean the whole thing is ridiculous". On May 4, 2016 (a few hours after Cruz lost the Indiana primary and withdrew his candidacy) Trump stated that he did not actually believe the story ("Of course I don't believe that") but the Enquirer wanted to "let the people read it." Kilmeade has since expressed regret for not following up on Trump's May 3 comment during that interview. On July 22, 2016, Trump again mentioned the magazine in connection with Cruz's father, saying "I know nothing about his father. I know nothing about Lee Harvey Oswald. But there was a picture on the front page of the National Enquirer that does have credibility."

==== Donald Trump sexual misconduct allegations ====
The National Enquirer received, and refused to publish a story from Karen McDougal about an alleged affair she had with Trump in 2006 and, in 2016 as his presidential campaign advanced, paid McDougal $150,000 for, among other items, "exclusive life rights to any relationship she has had with a then-married man." The Wall Street Journal said that the tabloid had paid McDougal hush money and was using the purchase and refusal to publish the story to protect Trump (a technique known as catch and kill), an allegation the publication denied. In February 2018, after a similar situation involving Stormy Daniels (not involving the National Enquirer) was confirmed, McDougal confirmed her story to Ronan Farrow for The New Yorker, stating that the National Enquirer had loosened the terms of the contract after Trump was elected but that she was unsure of how much she could discuss under the terms of the agreement. The publication had also paid $30,000 to an employee at one of Trump's hotels who claimed that Trump fathered a child out of wedlock during the 1980s; the payment came in November 2015, before the paper publicly endorsed Trump, and according to reports in The New Yorker, the title's staff was investigating the story and preparing to publish the employee's claims before National Enquirer owner David Pecker personally quashed it.

In late 2015, the parent company of the National Enquirer, AMI, paid $30,000 to Dino Sajudin, a doorman at Trump Tower, to obtain the rights to his story in which he alleged Donald Trump had an affair in the 1980s that resulted in the birth of a child. Sajudin in April 2018 identified the woman as Trump's former housekeeper. AMI reporters were given the names of the woman and the alleged child, while Sajudin passed a lie detector test when testifying that he had heard the story from others. Shortly after the payment was made, Pecker ordered the reporters to drop the story. In April 2018, AMI chief content officer Dylan Howard denied the story was "spiked" in a so-called "catch and kill" operation, insisting that AMI did not run the story because Sajudin's story lacked credibility. CNN obtained a copy of the contract between AMI and Sajudin on August 24, 2018, after AMI had released Sajudin from the contract. CNN published excerpts of the contract, which instructed Sajudin to provide "information regarding Donald Trump's illegitimate child", but did not contain further specifics of Sajudin's story.

==== Brzezinski, Scarborough, and the Trump administration ====
In June 2017, Morning Joe hosts Mika Brzezinski and Joe Scarborough stated that senior officials in the Trump administration had tried to blackmail the two of them using the National Enquirer. According to them, the tabloid threatened to publish a smear article on the couple unless the two personally called Trump and begged him to have the story spiked. They refused, and the title (which did not have direct contact with Scarborough or Brzezinski) published the story. The Trump administration also denied the story; Scarborough claims he has saved phone correspondence to the contrary.

==== Jeff Bezos ====
In February 2019, Jeff Bezos alleged that the National Enquirer had threatened to publish private messages and photographs belonging to Bezos and his girlfriend, Lauren Sánchez, if Bezos did not stop The Washington Post, which he owns, from pursuing journalistic inquiries into how the publication obtained those messages and photographs. Bezos also said that in 2018, the year in which Saudi Arabian officials reportedly murdered Washington Post reporter Jamal Khashoggi, the National Enquirer had published a glossy magazine, The New Kingdom, promoting Saudi Arabia.

=== Notable stories and lawsuits ===
In 1981, actress Carol Burnett won a judgment against the National Enquirer after it claimed she had been seen drunk in public at a restaurant with Henry Kissinger in attendance. The fact that both of her parents suffered from alcoholism made this a particularly sensitive issue to Burnett. The former longtime chief editor Iain Calder in his book The Untold Story, asserted that afterwards, while under his leadership, the publication worked hard to check the reliability of its facts and its sources. The National Enquirer additionally scooped other media outlets during the O. J. Simpson murder trial: when a distinctive footprint from a Bruno Magli shoe was found at the crime scene, Simpson vehemently denied owning such a shoe. The title, however, published two photos showing Simpson wearing Bruno Magli shoes. David Perel was the editor in charge of the paper's Simpson coverage, which was highly lauded by mainstream media.

Controversy over false content arose again for the National Enquirer when a 2002 article alleged that male members of the family of kidnapping victim Elizabeth Smart were involved in what the article termed a "gay sex ring." Subsequently, two reporters from the Salt Lake Tribune were fired after it was learned that they had been paid $20,000 for the story, which they had fabricated. The title threatened to sue the Salt Lake Tribune for making false and defamatory statements about the publication after an editorial had disclaimed the Tribune's involvement. The salacious details of the Smart story were retracted by the publication, and a rare apology was issued to the Smart family. One of the fired reporters acknowledged that his behavior was unethical, but expressed surprise that the story had been taken seriously, stating, "When I dealt with the National Enquirer, I never dreamed that I was accepting money for 'information'."

The National Enquirer settled a libel lawsuit with the wife of Gary Condit out of court in 2003, and lost a suit brought by actress Kate Hudson in 2006. Also in 2006, the National Enquirer was the first newspaper to reveal that O. J. Simpson had written a book, If I Did It. The story was immediately denied by Simpson's lawyer, but was confirmed by release of the book one month later. In early March 2007, the paper blocked access to its website for British and Irish readers because a story about the actress Cameron Diaz that they had published in 2005 and for which she received an apology had appeared on the site. The apology concerned a story it had run in 2005 entitled "Cameron Caught Cheating" which turned out to be false – an accompanying picture was just an innocent goodbye hug to a friend, not evidence of an affair. Although only 279 British web addresses had looked at the story, it was deemed to have therefore been published in the United Kingdom. British libel laws are more plaintiff-friendly and it is not necessary to prove actual malice for the plaintiff to win.

Also in March 2007, Tucker Chapman, son of Duane "Dog" Chapman, sold a tape to the National Enquirer of his father disparaging his black girlfriend with the use of the word "nigger", for which the tabloid paid Tucker an undisclosed amount. The A&E Network canceled Chapman's show, Dog the Bounty Hunter, pending an investigation. On February 21, 2008, A&E Network stated they would resume production of Dog the Bounty Hunter, and on May 14, 2008, announced it would return to TV on June 25, 2008. On January 19, 2010, the Pulitzer Prize Board announced that the National Enquirer is eligible for consideration for the Pulitzer Prize in the categories of Investigative Journalism and National News Reporting. This change is primarily due to the Enquirer's breaking the story of John Edwards' affair with Rielle Hunter. In February 2012, the National Enquirer published a photo of Whitney Houston in an open casket on its front page. The previous week, it had posted an article showing her having collapsed from a cocaine and alcohol binge during her world tour and claiming that she only had five years to live.

=== Editorial changes ===
In 1999 AMI was bought by a group fronted by publishing executive David J. Pecker. Funding was diverted from the National Enquirer, once considered to be the company's principal publication, to Star magazine. Editor Steve Coz, who guided the paper through the Simpson case, was fired and replaced by David Perel, who had been the Editor in charge of breaking numerous stories on the Simpson coverage.

The National Enquirer's circulation for a time fell below 1 million (from over 6 million at its height). AMI brought in around 20 British journalists in early 2005, headed by editor Paul Field, a former executive at the British tabloid The Sun, and relocated the editorial offices to New York for an April 2005 relaunch. The move failed badly and Field and virtually all the British journalists were sacked after a year. The company reappointed David Perel and announced the National Enquirer offices would return to Boca Raton, Florida, in May 2006. Circulation numbers then climbed to over 1 million readers again, and according to the Audit Bureau of Circulations reached over 1 million. Perel later moved on to oversee the relaunch of the gossip website Radar Online, and was replaced as editor-in-chief by Tony Frost. In 2014, the publication moved back to New York and Frost was replaced by Dylan Howard. Howard and the National Enquirer parted ways when his contract, which expired March 31, 2020, was not renewed.

On April 10, 2019, the National Enquirer was said to be up for sale and likely to be sold within days. Chatham Asset Management owner Anthony Melchiorre, whose company acquired control of 80 percent of AMI's stock, expressed disapproval of the Enquirer's style of journalism. This was confirmed on April 18, 2019, when it was announced that AMI had agreed to sell the National Enquirer, and also two other AMI tabloid publications Globe and National Examiner, to Hudson Group.

== Checkbook journalism controversy ==
On April 22, 2024, former AMI head David Pecker acknowledged in court that the National Enquirer engaged in the practice of checkbook journalism which involved paying sources for stories, and that he "told the editors that they could not spend more than $10,000" and he had final say over celebrity stories. He also acknowledged that "checkbook journalism" served as part of the editorial philosophy he followed when he ran AMI. Pecker also stated that he believed that "the only thing that is important is the cover of a magazine."

== Support of Donald Trump ==
According to June 2018 reporting in The Washington Post, executives at the National Enquirer sent articles and cover images pertaining to Donald Trump or his electoral opponents to Michael Cohen, Trump's lawyer, prior to their publication. The Post reported that this practice continued after Trump became President of the United States. American Media Inc. denied sharing material prior to publication. Federal prosecutors subpoenaed AMI as part of their investigations into Michael Cohen for possible violation of campaign finance laws. According to reporting by the Associated Press, during the 2016 United States presidential election, stories that supported Trump or attacked his rivals bypassed the newspaper's standard fact checking process. Trump reportedly suggested stories to David Pecker—sometimes via Hope Hicks and sometimes personally—including a negative story about Republican primary opponent Ben Carson.

While testifying during Trump's New York criminal trial in April 2024, Pecker provided detail on how he offered to deploy the "catch and kill" scheme to support Trump's presidential campaign, stating that he offered in 2015 to suppress negative stories about Trump and also flag any efforts which were made by women attempting to sell stories about Trump as well. Specifically, Pecker noted how he and staff at the National Enquirer targeted former Trump Tower employee Dino Sajudin, who was trying to sell a story that Trump fathered an illegitimate girl, and sought the name of the maid whom Sajudin alleged Trump had the affair with, with a National Enquirer editor agreeing to pay $30,000 for the story. The second "catch-and-kill" target would be Karen McDougal, with Pecker stating that National Enquirer editor Dylan Howard got word of her allegation in June 2016, and noted how afterwards, he, Howard, and Cohen conspired to get her to accept a payment of $150,000 in exchange for her story.

== Defamatory publications ==
The National Enquirer issued a formal apology in the September 2017 edition of their magazine for false statements, defaming Judy Sheindlin of the courtroom series Judge Judy as having cheated on her husband and suffering from Alzheimer's disease along with brain damage. In addition, they apologized to her daughter Nicole Sheindlin for defaming her as having a jail record.

== "Catch and kill" ==
On April 22, 2024, David Pecker testified in court: "We used checkbook journalism, and we paid for stories". He said that the editors under him had discretion to spend about $10,000 on a story and that any budget above that would be subject to his personal approval. When Karen McDougal claimed to have had an affair with President Trump, the newspaper coordinated with the Trump campaign to pay McDougal $150,000 to benefit the campaign, effectively turning the payment into a campaign contribution. The National Enquirer publicly admitted to "catch and kill" in this instance. The Federal Election Commission fined the newspaper $187,000. Stormy Daniels has also claimed the title was involved in the "catch and kill" of her affair with Trump as well. The prosecution of Trump's former lawyer Michael Cohen has also involved the purported use of "catch and kill" practices by the title.

== Television spin-off ==
On August 30, 1999, a television spin-off of the supermarket tabloid was entitled National Enquirer TV and was produced by MGM Television. The series was renamed National Enquirer's Uncovered in season 2 and was cancelled on July 6, 2001.

== "Enquiring minds want to know" catchphrase ==
During the 1980s, the tabloid's slogan in radio and TV ads was "Enquiring minds want to know." The phrase is also used by Willow Rosenberg in the US TV drama series Buffy the Vampire Slayer. In the song "Midnight Star" from his album "Weird Al" Yankovic in 3-D, "Weird Al" Yankovic uses the phrase during the song's outro. In 1987, the publisher of the National Enquirer trademarked the phrase, which uses the alternative (and more commonly British) spelling of "inquiring".

== Documentaries ==
The origin and history of the newspaper and Generoso Pope Jr.'s life are the main subjects of a 2014 documentary, directed by Ric Burns and called Enquiring Minds: The Untold Story of the Man Behind the National Enquirer. A 2019 documentary directed by Mark Landsman, Scandalous: The True Story of the National Enquirer, describes the paper's coverage of topics such as the O. J. Simpson murder investigation, the role of paparazzi in the death of Princess Diana, and the Donald Trump 2016 presidential campaign.
