= Sean McCourt =

American actor (born 1971)

- Born: January 19, 1971 (age 55); Detroit, Michigan, U.S.
- Occupation: Actor
- Spouse: Beth Thompson
- Children: 2

Sean McCourt (born January 19, 1971) is an American actor. His Broadway credits include Wicked, Titanic, It Ain't Nothin' but the Blues, Women on the Verge of a Nervous Breakdown, and Mary Poppins.

== Career ==
He is the narrator and executive producer of Barnwood Builders on DIY Network.

McCourt played the drunk, psychopathic Dr. Thomas Parker in the original cast of the Off-Broadway show Bat Boy: The Musical, in 2001, appearing with Deven May, Kaitlin Hopkins, and Kerry Butler.

=== Wicked ===
McCourt starred in the original Broadway cast of Wicked, which opened on October 30, 2003, as Frexspar Thropp and the Ozian Official. He also served as an understudy for The Wizard and Doctor Dillamond. After previews from October 8, 2003, the show opened on October 30 at the Gershwin Theatre. McCourt replaced Joel Grey as the Wizard in the summer of 2004. On July 26, 2005, McCourt replaced William Youmans in the lead role of Doctor Dillamond and departed the company on August 6, 2006 after almost three years with the show.

He is the co-creator of Behind the Emerald Curtain – a behind-the-scenes tour of Wicked.

McCourt returned to Wicked for a brief stint in February/March 2012. He reprised his roles as the Witch's Father and the Ozian Official, as well as returning to understudy the Wizard and Doctor Dillamond, covering for vacationing cast member Michael DeVries. He returned to play the same track briefly in May 2013, covering DeVries' holiday once again.

=== Television ===
On television, McCourt appeared in All My Children, Ed, Sesame Street, and several episodes of Law & Order . Around 2010, McCourt began producing television. He has produced and directed Garbage Moguls on NatGeo, The Bait, on Discovery, and five seasons of Barnwood Builders on DIY Network.

== Personal life ==
McCourt and his wife Beth Thompson live in South Orange, New Jersey, with their two daughters Clara and Charlotte (as of 2006).
