= Bat Boy (character) =

Tabloid hoax and mascot

- Weekly World News character
- Created by: Dick Kulpa

In-universe information
- Alias: Bat child
- Species: Half-bat, half-human
- Gender: Male
- Family: Herbert Sr. (grandfather); Susan Boy (mother); Ruth Carter Cash Boy (sister)
- Born: 1982 (age 43–44)

Bat Boy is a fictional creature who made numerous appearances in the American supermarket tabloid Weekly World News, beginning with a front page story in 1992. The character became a pop-culture icon. In 1997, the story of Bat Boy was turned into an off-Broadway musical, Bat Boy: The Musical.

== History ==
Weekly World News is a tabloid newspaper that publishes patently fabricated stories which purport to be factual. Within the pages of the paper, Bat Boy is described as a creature who is "half human and half bat". His pursuers, according to Weekly World News, are scientists and United States government officials; he is frequently captured, then later makes a daring escape. The original scientist who found him was named Dr. Ron Dillon. Another character, Matthew Daemon, S.O.S. (Seeker of Obscure Supernaturals), crossed paths with him in several stories.

Bat Boy was created by former Weekly World News editor Dick Kulpa. Writer Bob Lind was assigned the story six weeks later. He debuted as a cover story on June 23, 1992. The original front-page photo of Bat Boy, showing his grotesque screaming face, was the second-best selling issue in the tabloid's history, and he has since evolved into a pop-culture icon. He became the tabloid's de facto mascot of sorts.

== In popular culture ==
=== Adventures of Batboy cartoon ===
Cartoonist Peter Bagge originally penned the "Adventures of Batboy" for the Weekly World News. According to the cartoon, Bat Boy is currently hitchhiking with a typical American family after resigning from being the President of the United States (and King), has placed Weekly World News columnist Ed Anger under arrest and saying goodbyes to Beyoncé, a half sasquatch (with whom he was romantically involved), and Dr. Ron. In the strip, Bat Boy joins a death metal/thrash metal band as their lead singer. Cartoonist Danielle Corsetto, creator of webcomic Girls with Slingshots, took over from Bagge in 2005 and drew the strip until the WWN ceased publication in 2007.

=== Bat Boy: The Musical ===
A musical based on the Bat Boy character premiered at Tim Robbins' Actors Gang Theatre on Halloween, 1997 and has since been produced Off Broadway, in London's West End, and in scores of productions throughout the world. Music and lyrics are by Laurence O'Keefe, with a book by Brian Flemming and Keythe Farley.

== Sources ==
- Leed, Barry; McGinness, Neil; Weekly World News; Bat Boy LLC (2010-09-14). Going Mutant: The Bat Boy Exposed!. Simon and Schuster. ISBN 978-1-4391-5700-8.

== Bibliography ==
- "Bat Boy Found in West Virginia Cave!" by Bill Creighton, Weekly World News, June 23, 1992, pp 46–47. Reprinted July 6, 1999, pp. 46–47. Reprinted June 20, 2005, pp. 58–59.
- "Bat Boy Escapes!" by Dack Kennedy, October 6, 1992, p. 5.
- "U.S. Govt. to Blame for Letting Bat Boy Escape!" by Ed Anger, October 6, 1992, p. 17.
- "New Wave of Bat Boy Sightings" anonymous, December 8, 1992, pp. 4–5.
- "Bat Boy Attacks Girl, 10!" by Joe Berger, March 9, 1993, pp. 4–5.
- "Bat Boy on the Loose!" Weekly World News Special 76-Page Collector's Edition, May 1993, pp. 38–39.
- "'I've Captured Bat Boy'" by Jack Alexander, July 27, 1993, p. 29.
- "FBI Captures Bat Boy!" by Conrad Morse, August 31, 1993, pp. 24–25.
- "Bat Boy Saga Heats Up" Anonymous, January 4–11, 1994, p. 51.
- "Bat Boy Dead, Claims U.S. Govt." by Nick Mann, January 31, 1995, p. 46.
- "Escaped Bat Boy Sighted in Texas!" by Global News Service, April 11, 1995, p. 3.
- "New Jersey Lovebirds Getting Married – Thanks to Elvis and Bat Boy" by Tanya Broder, February 20, 1996, p. 39.
- "Bat Boy Captured!" by Joe Berger, September 16, 1997, pp. 8–9.
- "Bat Boy Is Learning How to Talk!" by Mike Foster, March 24, 1998, p. 13.
- "Second Bat Child Captured in West Virginia, Confirms Researcher," by Alex Morgan, September 15, 1998, p. 25.
- "Half-Human Half-Bat Locked Up in Secret Medical Lab!" by Kevin Creed, August 31, 1999, p. 13.
- "Bat Boy on the Loose!" by Wolf Landrum, September 7, 1999, pp. 36–37.
- "Bat Child Attacks Girl" by Ernst Craven, September 19, 2000, pp 40–41.
- "'I Will Hunt Down Bat Boy and Kill Him!'" by Rex Wolfe, October 9, 2001, p. 20.
- "Stay Tuned—Something BIG Is Brewing for Bat Boy" by Ernst Craven, October 30, 2001, p. 8.
- "Pentagon Mum on Bat Boy Whereabouts" by Mary Kingston, November 6, 2001, p. 7.
- "It's a Bird... It's a Plane... No – It's Bat Boy... Training with the U.S. Army!" by Andi Cretel, November 20, 2001, p. 45.
- "Bat Boy Meets with Bush at Camp David" by Tomaso Focata, November 27, 2001, p. 9.
- "Bat Boy Bites Santa Claus!" by Brett Anniston, December 18, 2001, p. 10.
- "Bat Boy Storms Afghanistan with U.S. Marines" by Alicia Bousch, December 25, 2001, pp. 18–19.
- "'Bring Us the Head of Bat Boy!'" by Lois Castini, January 8, 2002, p. 8.
- "Batty-Mitzvah" by Anonymous, January 15, 2002, p. 69.
- Letters to the Editor by Hans Schrierst of William Morris Agency and Alfred E. Newman of Mad Magazine, January 9, 2002.
- "Bat Boy Behind Bars!" by Miguel Figueroa, February 19, 2002, p. 42.
- "Bat Boy Escapes Terrorists: Now He's on the Lam in South America!" by Joan Ryan, February 26, 2002, pp. 42–43.
- "FBI Warns: Don't Be Fooled by This Bat Boy Impersonator!" by Vincenzo Sardi, March 5, 2002, pp. 2–3.
- "Bat Boy Saves Washington from 'Dirty Bomb' Disaster... & You Won't Believe How!" by Miguel Figueroa, April 30, 2002, pp. 12–13.
- "Yes, Jacob, There Is a Bat Boy," Sound Off, July 23, 2002, p. 4.
- Sound Off! Letter to the Editor by Joseph B., August 20, 2002, p. 4.
- Sound Off! Letter to the Editor by "Draff" and "Unicorn," August 27, 2002, p. 4.
- "Half Bat—Half Amazing" by Anonymous, September 10, 2002, p. 42.
- "Mutant Fruit" by Rick Kirk, October 8, 2002, p. 16.
- "Bat Boy Is Missing!" by Miguel Figueroa, October 15, 2002, p. 9.
- "Bat Boy Sightings!" Anonymous, November 19, 2002, p. 6-7.
- Sound Off! Letter to the Editor by Blake S., December 3, 2002, p. 4.
- "Police Seek Hero Mystery Boy in Capture of Child Molestor" by Mike Foster, December 17, 2002, p. 5.
- Sound Off! Letter to the Editor from Worried, December 24, 2002, p. 4.
- "Bat Boy Steals Car—And Goes on Three State Joy Ride!" by Wayne Diaz, January 14, 2003, pp. 6–7.
- "Bat Boy Still on the Lam!" by Brett Anniston, January 21, 2003, p. 37.
- "Bat Boy Still on the Lam" by Mike Foster, January 28, 2003, p. 37.
- "Bat Boy Abandons Stolen Car - & Vanishes" by Mike Foster, February 4, 2003, pp. 30–31.
- Weirdo Letter of the Week by Amanda W., February 18, 2003, p. 4.
- "Is J.Lo Seeing Bat Boy Behind Ben's Back?" by Martha S., February 25, 2003, p. 4.
- Sound Off! Letter to the Editor by Anonymous, March 4, 2003, p. 4.
- Newsmakers letter from Anthony and Elizabeth M., April 1, 2003, p. 2.
- Sound Off! Letter to the Editor by Albert P., April 15, 2003, p. 4.
- "Bat Boy Goes International!" by Dick Kulpo, April 15, 2003, p. 4.
- "Bat Boy Goes to War!" by Larry Mulder, April 22, 2003, pp. 24–25.
- "Thank God We Sent Bat Boy Into Iraq" by Martin T., May 6, 2003, p. 4.
- Sound Off! Letter to the Editor by Sandra M., June 3, 2003, p. 4.
- Letter of the Week by Beth L., July 15, 2003, p. 4.
- Sound Off! Letter to the Editor by Dr. Natalie P., July 29, 2003, p. 4.
- "Bat Boy to Fly Space Shuttle" by Deuce Collins, September 23, 2003, pp. 30–31.
- Sound Off! Letter to the Editor form Andy H., September 30, 2003, p. 4.
- Bat Boy Mask, October 28, 2003, p. 72.
- "Bat Boy Xmas Card!" December 2, 2003, p. 12.
- "Freaks, Geeks & Weirdos" by Kay Callahan, December 2, 2003, p. 26.
- Sound Off! Letter to the Editor by Harvey P. of Cleveland, Ohio, December 23, 2003, p. 4.
- "Bat Boy Led U.S. Troops to Saddam... Gotcha!" by Mike Foster, January 13, 2004, pp. 24–25.
- "The Bat Got the Rat" by Steven H., February 3, 2004, p. 4.
- Sound Off! Letter to the Editor by Clark D., February 17, 2004, p. 4.
- "New Adventures of Bat Boy!" by Peter Bagge, March 2, 2004, p. 9. (introduction to weekly Bat Boy comic strip)
- "Bat Boy: He's 50% Bat—100% Amazing" by Kate McClare, March 8, 2004, p. 9.
- "U.S. Plans to Clone Army of Bat Boys to Fight Terrorism!" by Ian Merkins, March 15, 2004, p. 9.
- Sound Off! Letters to the Editor by Gary G. and Bernie Q., March 22, 2004, p. 4.
- Sound Off! Letter to the Editor from Anthony L., March 29, 2004, p. 4.
- "Bat Boy to Be Knighted" by Michael Chiron, April 5, 2004, p. 8.
- Sound Off! Letter to the Editor by Ray L. Winder, May 3, 2004, p. 4.
- "Dynamic Duo! Bat Boy Lobbying Hard for Kerry's No. 2 Spot." by Nick Mann, May 31, 2004, pp. 2–3.
- "Bat Boy to Try Out for American Idol" by Paul Chiron, June 21, 2004, p. 8.
- Sound Off! Letter to the Editor by Staci M., June 28, 2004, p. 4.
- "Britney Is My Bride!" by Will Shivers, July 12, 2004, p. 9.
- "Fat Britney Fan Goes on Hunger Strike Over Reports She Married Bat Boy" by Brett Anniston, August 2, 2004, p. 37.
- "'I Can Cure Bat Boy!'" by Michael Forsyth, September 20, 2004, pp. 8–9.
- "Terrorists Kidnap Bat Boy!" by Nikki Long, October 11, 2004, p. 9.
- "Bat Boy Musical Knocks 'Em Dead in London" by Norv Keener, November 8, 2004, p. 9.
- "My Neighbor's Kid Looks Like Bat Boy—Can You Help Him?" by Mary Guevara, December 6, 2004, p. 4.; reprinted December 27, 2004, p. 4.
- "Dating Service for Freaks" by Darren Davenport, January 3, 2005, pp. 26–27.
- "Are James Carville & Bat Boy Kin?" by Mike Foster, January 17, 2005, pp. 8–9.
- "Kid Saving Up for Plastic Surgery—to Look Like Bat Boy!" Anonymous, April 25, 2005, p. 15.
- "Happy Birthday, America!" July 4, 2005, pp. 30–31.
- "Bat Boy to Join the Cast of Deadwood!" by Mark Miller, July 18, 2005, pp. 4–5.
- "Miss Adventure's Male Bag" by Drew Sullivan (letter attributed to Jeremy Lovett), December 5, 2005, p. 18.
- "Daemon Rushes to Save Boy-Bat Trapped in Cave" by Dick Siegel, December 12, 2005, p. 40-41.
- "Are Boy-Bat and Bat Boy Fraternal Twins Separated at Birth?" by Sammy Robin, January 2, 2006, p. 4.
- "Bat Boy in the Belfry" by Robert Greenberger, April 10, 2006, pp 12–13.
- "Protect Bat Boy at All Costs" by Robert Greenberger, April 17, 2006, pp. 12–13.
- Sound Off! Letters to the Editor by Richard Graysonne and Charlie Kane, May 1, 2006, p. 47.; reprinted June 19, 2006, p. 47.
- Sound Off! Letters to the Editor from K. Bates and Matt Tell, May 8, 2006, p. 47.
- "Candidate Visits Bat Boy's Home! Romney Promises to Protect Spelunkers from Monsters" by D. Patrick, March 26, 2007, p. 7.
- "Police Arrest 'Bat Boy': Elusive Creature Sighted in Upstate New York," by Dick Siegel, June 11, 2007, p. 4.
- "Kids' Letters to Bat Boy" by Dick Siegel, August 6, 2007, p. 12.
