= Kerry Butler =

American actress and singer

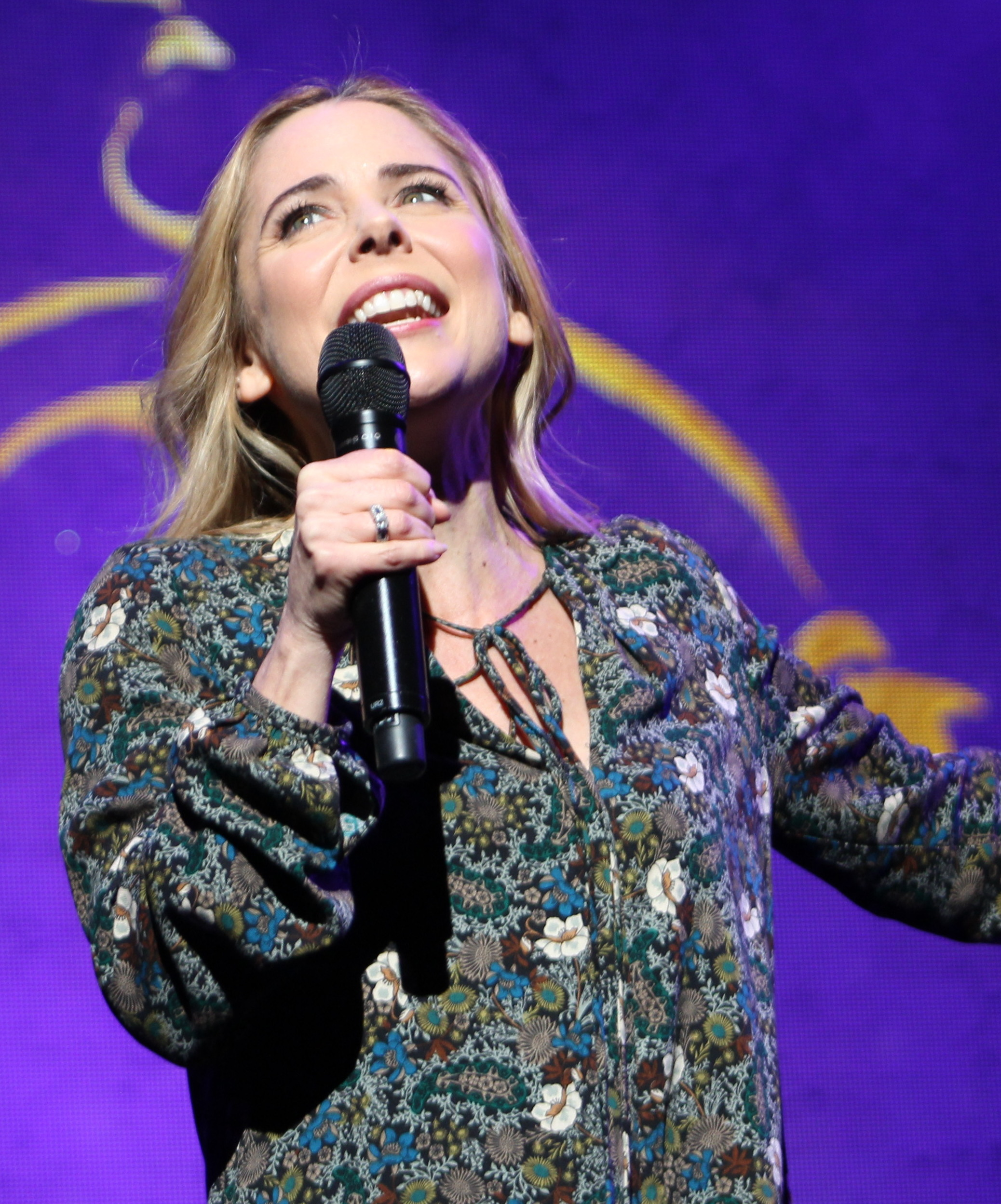
- Kerry Butler performing at the Epcot International Festival of the Arts on February 6, 2017
- Born: June 18, 1971 (age 55); New York City, U.S.
- Education: Ithaca College (BFA, 1992)
- Occupations: Actress; singer
- Years active: 1974–present
- Spouse: Joey Mazzarino (m. 1997)
- Children: 2

Kerry Butler (born June 18, 1971) is an American actress, singer, and voice actress known primarily for her work in theater. She is best known for originating the roles of Barbara Maitland in Beetlejuice, Penny Pingleton in Hairspray, and Clio/Kira in Xanadu, the latter of which earned her a Tony Award nomination for Best Performance by a Leading Actress in a Musical.

== Early life ==
Born in the Bensonhurst neighborhood of Brooklyn, Kerry Butler began acting in commercials at the age of three. She notes that growing up, "When I saw Annie ... I knew that was what I wanted to do." After a four-year hiatus imposed by her mother, Butler started acting again at the age of nine and has been at it since.

Butler graduated from Ithaca College in 1992, with a Bachelor of Fine Arts degree in musical theatre.

== Career ==
=== Early career ===
Butler toured with the musical Oklahoma! in Europe in the role of Ado Annie. Other New York roles included Vicky Hollins in the workshop of Bright Lights, Big City, Barrow in The "I" Word and Claudia in The Folsom Head. She also has done work on various commercials.

Butler made her Broadway debut in 1993 in the role of Miss Jones in the musical Blood Brothers, where she also understudied the role of Linda. In 1995, following her first major television role of voicing the eponymous protagonist of the first season of Princess Gwenevere and the Jewel Riders, Butler originated the role of Belle for the Toronto production of Disney's Beauty and the Beast, and she was nominated for a Dora Mavor Moore Award for Best Leading Actress for her performance. Butler eventually transferred to Broadway as Belle, and, after playing the role for over two years, she left the musical in September 1997 and was replaced by Debbie Gibson. She then moved over to Les Misérables to play Éponine Thénardier.

In 2001 Butler played the love interest Shelley Parker in the acclaimed Off-Broadway original musical Bat Boy: The Musical. Though the show had a "fanatical following", Butler noted that "We were really building an audience before Sept. 11. And after that we never recovered. People didn't want to go out at all, let alone downtown." Bat Boy closed in December 2001.

=== 2002-2009 ===
Kerry Butler performing at a benefit concert for Hurricane Katrina in New York City, October 23, 2005.

In February 2002, Butler was cast as Penny Pingleton (a role she had originated in workshops) in Hairspray, the musical version of the John Waters 1988 film of the same name. After an out-of-town tryout at the 5th Avenue Theatre in Seattle, Hairspray opened on Broadway in August 2002 and "became an immediate Broadway smash." Even in a star-studded ensemble cast, reviewers singled Butler out for her sparkling performance as the wacky best friend. The show won eight Tony Awards including Best Musical at the 57th Tony Awards. For her performance, Butler was nominated for a Drama Desk Award for Outstanding Featured Actress in a Musical and an Outer Critics Circle Award and received a Clarence Derwent Award.

While Hairspray went into pre-production, Butler played the free-spirited performance artist Maddie in the limited run of the intimate Australian musical Prodigal at the York Theatre. In March 2002, Butler also appeared on the TV show Sesame Street as Ms. Camp, a letter carrier. During her run in Hairspray, Butler filmed a TV pilot for Fox entitled Twins, but it was not picked up for the season. After starring in Hairspray for a year, Butler left the cast in July 2003 and was succeeded by Jenn Gambatese.

Following the end of her Hairspray contract, Butler was cast as Audrey Fulquard in the Broadway revival production of the musical Little Shop of Horrors. Butler revisited her long-lost childhood Brooklyn accent to play Audrey, the love interest with a sadistic dentist boyfriend Dr. Orin Scrivello and a heart of gold. A fan of Little Shop composer Alan Menken, who also wrote the music for Beauty and the Beast, Butler received an Outer Critics Circle nomination for her performance.

After leaving the show in the summer of 2004, Butler traveled to San Francisco where she created the role of scheming, foul-mouthed teenager Dedee Truitt in the new musical The Opposite of Sex, which had its world premiere at the Magic Theatre that fall. The musical is based on Don Roos' 1998 film starring Christina Ricci and Lisa Kudrow.

In the fall of 2005, Butler appeared in the original Off-Broadway musical Miracle Brothers at the Vineyard Theatre. She played Isabel, a mother made miserable by the rebelliousness of her son as well as her unhappy marriage.

In the summer of 2006, Butler reprised her role of Dedee in The Opposite of Sex at the Williamstown Theatre Festival and followed that by taking on the role of Kate, the Ayn Rand-loving runaway bride, in the New York Musical Theatre Festival production of Party Come Here.

Butler also portrayed the manipulative heiress and recovering alcoholic Claudia Reston on the ABC soap opera One Life to Live from January 2006 until January 2007, when her character was written off the show.

From May 2007 through September 2008, Butler returned to the Broadway stage to star in the new musical Xanadu, based on the 1980 roller-disco film starring Olivia Newton-John. She played the dual role of Clio/Kira, a Greek muse who inspires and falls in love with Sonny Malone, a struggling artist. Butler mastered roller skating for the role and spent nearly the duration of the show on skates. Widely expected to be a flop, the musical opened in July 2007 to extensive critical acclaim and was the surprise hit of the summer. For her role in Xanadu, Butler was nominated for the Tony Award for Best Performance by a Leading Actress in a Musical at the 62nd Tony Awards and the Drama League Award for Distinguished Performance.

In February and March 2008, Butler appeared as Reese, the thieving assistant to fashion designer Victory Ford (Lindsay Price), in the first season of the television series Lipstick Jungle on NBC.

In May 2008, Butler released her first solo album on the PS Classics label. The album is entitled Faith, Trust & Pixie Dust and features some of Butler's favorite songs from Disney films and shows given "intimate, acoustic" arrangements. The title is taken from the lyrics of the Jonatha Brooke song "I'll Try", from the film Return to Neverland, which is featured on the album. Of note is the track "This Only Happens in the Movies", an unreleased song written by Alan Menken (for the unrealized prequel to Who Framed Roger Rabbit), being given its inaugural recording.

The following year, Butler was again featured as a guest star on major television shows. In May 2009 she appeared on an episode of NBC's 30 Rock, as Lyle, a member of a group of New York ladies of leisure with a surprising secret. The following month, she appeared on the ABC series Cupid as Debbie, a working-class masseuse who attempts to improve herself to impress her wealthy boyfriend Lance Stillwell (Paul Fitzgerald).

In the summer of 2009, Butler appeared in the world premiere of Catch Me If You Can at the 5th Avenue Theatre, the same venue where Hairspray had its pre-Broadway tryout. She played Brenda Strong, the Southern ingénue who falls in love with the con artist Frank Abagnale, Jr. (The role was played by Amy Adams in the Steven Spielberg film version of Catch Me If You Can.)

In September 2009, Butler began a six-month engagement in the Broadway musical Rock of Ages, playing six performances a week. She played the lead role of Sherrie Christian, a small-town girl who moves to the Sunset Strip in Los Angeles to pursue her dream of becoming an actress. Butler left the production on March 13, 2010.

=== 2010-2019 ===
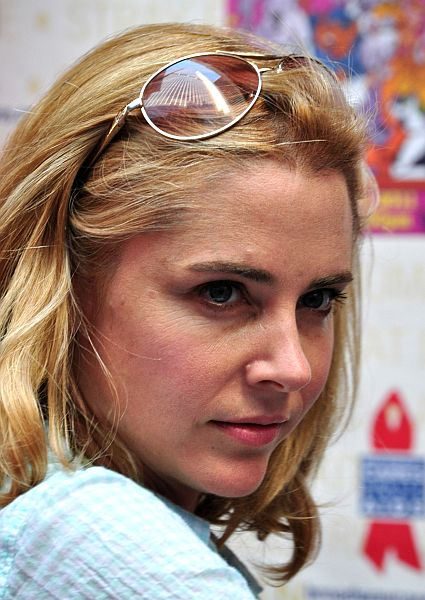
Butler in 2011

In April 2010, Butler made her New York City cabaret debut at Feinstein's at the Regency with a show of songs she has performed on Broadway as well as personal favorites.

In October 2010, Butler starred in the New York Musical Theatre Festival production of Pandora's Box, playing the title role of Pandora, a slightly naïve suburban housewife whose life is turned upside down by the arrival of a mysterious stranger. She also appeared as Mary Jo Clarkson, an Islamist terrorist, on the CBS television show Blue Bloods.

From March to September 2011, Butler reprised the role of Brenda Strong in the Broadway production of Catch Me if You Can at the Neil Simon Theatre, the same Broadway theatre where Hairspray played. For this role she was nominated for the Drama Desk Award for Outstanding Featured Actress in a Musical.

Also in September 2011, Butler appeared on the series finale of FX's Rescue Me as Marsha, an overprotective mother who argues with Denis Leary's character Tommy Gavin on a playground.

From March through September 2012, Butler appeared in the Broadway revival of Gore Vidal's The Best Man. She played Mabel Cantwell, the Southern wife of a presidential candidate. The production costarred Angela Lansbury, James Earl Jones, Candice Bergen, Eric McCormack, John Larroquette, Michael McKean, and Jefferson Mays. It was her first Broadway role in a drama, rather than a musical.

On February 18, 2013, Butler played Evelyn Nesbit in a concert production of Ragtime at Avery Fisher Hall. Also that month, she appeared on an episode of White Collar, playing Leslie, a skeptical art dealer.

From March through May 2013, Butler appeared Off-Broadway in The Call, a new play by Tanya Barfield, a co-production between Playwrights Horizons and Primary Stages. In it, Butler played Annie, an urban artist who decides to adopt a baby from Africa.

In May 2013, Butler appeared on an episode of Law and Order: Special Victims Unit as Ariel Randolph, a mother with a secret life whose bad decisions have tragic consequences.

From April to June 2014, Butler appeared Off-Broadway in Under My Skin, a comedy by Robert Sternin and Prudence Fraser (of The Nanny fame).

In October 2014, Butler starred in the York Theatre Company production of Big alongside John Tartaglia. She played Susan Lawrence, who works at a toy company and becomes the love interest of the main character Josh Baskin.

In December 2014, Butler appeared on The Mysteries of Laura as Mrs. Sullivan, a protective mother and on Elementary as Astrid, a birdwatcher.

From March through June 2015, Butler appeared Off-Broadway at New World Stages in Clinton: The Musical, a satirical look at the years of Bill Clinton's presidency. She played Hillary Clinton and received good reviews for her role.

In April 2015, Butler lent her vocal talents to the animated children's program Wallykazam!, voicing the character of Nancy the Noodle.

In October 2015, Butler made her solo debut at Feinstein's/54 Below with Seth Rudetsky on piano, performing hits from her career as well as telling behind-the-scenes stories.

In November 2015, Butler appeared on The Mindy Project as Dr. Jody Kimball-Kinney (Garrett Dillahunt)'s sister-in-law (and sometime mistress) Ann Marie Kimball-Kinney.

Butler appeared in the Netflix television mini-series Gilmore Girls: A Year in the Life, which was released in November 2016. She plays Claudia, therapist to Lorelai Gilmore (Lauren Graham) and Emily Gilmore (Kelly Bishop).

From February to May 2016, Butler appeared on Broadway in Disaster!, by Seth Rudetsky and Jack Plotnick, a parody of 1970s disaster movies featuring hit songs from that decade, on the role of Marianne Wilson. The reviews for the show were generally favorable, especially from The New York Times, which listed the show as a Critic's Pick. However, due to poor ticket sales, the show closed on May 8, 2016.

From October to December 2017, Butler appeared in the Broadway-bound musical adaptation of Mean Girls, by Tina Fey, Jeff Richmond, and Nell Benjamin. The show had an out-of-town tryout at the National Theatre in Washington, D.C. Butler played the roles of Ms. Norbury (played by Tina Fey in the film), Mrs. Heron, and Mrs. George. From March to September 2018, Butler played the roles of Ms. Norbury, Mrs. Heron, and Mrs. George in Mean Girls on Broadway. Butler played her final performance on September 9 and was replaced by Jennifer Simard.

Reviews took note of her standout performance in the three very different roles. The Hollywood Reporter noted her role as "...stand-in from the movie, sardonic math teacher Ms. Norbury, played here by Kerry Butler, acing triple-duty with distinctive takes also on Cady's earnest mother and Regina's self-described 'cool mom'". Variety wrote, in reviewing the Washington, D.C., production: "Kerry Butler offers delightful turns as the teacher, Mrs. Norbury, precisely mimicking Fey's role in the film, along with a hysterical portrayal of Regina's developmentally arrested mother (Amy Poehler in the film). The latter includes a delicious parody of 'Saturday Night Live's' iconic skit, 'The Californians.'"

From October to November 2018, Butler appeared in the world premiere of the musical Beetlejuice at the National Theatre in Washington, D.C., in the role of Barbara Maitland. Butler played the role in the Broadway production of the show from March 2019 until its closing in March 2020, due to the COVID-19 pandemic. She is one of the original cast members who reprised her role when Beetlejuice returned to Broadway in April 2022.

=== 2020-present ===
Beginning December 2020, Butler launched a podcast called Breaking Broadway, on the Broadway Podcast Network. Described as "an insider's roadmap to making it on Broadway," it features Butler interviewing a wide variety of people involved in the world of theatre.

In April 2023, Butler appeared in an episode of The Marvelous Mrs. Maisel as Tuppance, a woman who has just seen a play with friends and is discussing the show afterwards at dinner.

In October 2023, Butler made her directorial debut by helming a production of Newsies at Rise Above Performing Arts in Sarasota, Florida.

In April 2024, Butler appeared on Law & Order: Special Victims Unit as Denise Lynch, a mother in search of her missing daughter Sydney Lynch (Amalina Ace).

In September 2024, Butler appeared in American Sports Story: Aaron Hernandez as Shelley Meyer, the wife of football coach Urban Meyer (Tony Yazbeck).

In January 2024, Butler appeared with her original Hairspray costars Laura Bell Bundy and Marissa Jaret Winokur in Mama, I'm a Big Girl Now!, a concert the three of them conceived, wrote, and directed. The show depicts their origins as performers, careers, experience of being in the blockbuster musical together, over 20 years of friendship, and journeys to motherhood.

In November 2024, Butler, Bundy, and Winokur brought the show Off-Broadway, to New World Stages, for a limited run. Their efforts were rewarded when the show was nominated for the Drama Desk Award for Outstanding Revue.

From June 2025 to January 2026, Butler appeared in the revival of Heathers: The Musical at New World Stages, playing the dual roles of Ms. Fleming and Veronica's Mom. The show reunites Butler with composer Laurence O'Keefe, with whom she first worked with on Bat Boy: The Musical.

In October 2025, Butler took a leave of absence from Heathers to appear in the New York City Center Annual Gala production of Bat Boy. In a full-circle moment, she played Meredith Parker, the mother of Shelley Parker, her character in the original Off-Broadway production. The production contained new songs and orchestrations, and once again reunited her with Laurence O'Keefe. For her role, Butler received a nomination for the Drama League Award in Distinguished Performance.

Butler was announced as the director of an October 2026 production of Little Shop of Horrors for Harbor Lights Theatre in Massachusetts.

== Personal life ==
Butler is a vegetarian and activist whose concerns include youth mentoring, human rights violations, genocide, and environmental issues.

Butler is married to childhood friend, Muppet writer, and puppeteer Joey Mazzarino. They have two daughters, whom they adopted from Ethiopia. Their older daughter is the inspiration for the Sesame Street song "I Love My Hair".

== Credits ==
=== Theatre ===
| Year | Title | Role | Notes |
|---|---|---|---|
| 1992 | Oklahoma! | Ado Annie | European Tour |
| 1993 | Blood Brothers | Miss Jones | Music Box Theatre, Broadway |
| 1995–1997 | Beauty and the Beast | Belle | Princess of Wales Theatre, Toronto Palace Theatre, Broadway |
| 1998 | The Folsom Head | Claudia | Currican Theatre, Off-Broadway |
| 1998–1999 | Les Misérables | Éponine Thénardier | Imperial Theatre, Broadway |
| 1999 | The "I" Word | Barrow | Ensemble Studio Theatre, Off-Broadway |
| 2001 | Bat Boy: The Musical | Shelley Parker | Union Square Theatre, Off-Broadway |
| 2002–2003 | Hairspray | Penny Pingleton | 5th Avenue Theatre, Seattle Neil Simon Theatre, Broadway |
| 2003 | Prodigal | Maddy | York Theatre, Off-Broadway |
| 2003–2004 | Little Shop of Horrors | Audrey Fulquard | Virginia Theatre, Broadway |
| 2004 | The Opposite of Sex | Dedee Truitt | Magic Theatre, San Francisco |
| 2005 | Miracle Brothers | Isabel | Vineyard Theatre, Off-Broadway |
| 2006 | The Opposite of Sex | Dedee Truitt | Williamstown Theatre Festival |
| 2006 | Party Come Here | Kate | The New York Musical Theatre Festival |
| 2007–2008 | Xanadu | Clio/Kira | Helen Hayes Theatre, Broadway |
| 2009–2010 | Rock of Ages | Sherrie Christian | Brooks Atkinson Theatre, Broadway |
| 2009–2011 | Catch Me If You Can | Brenda Strong | 5th Avenue Theatre, Seattle Neil Simon Theatre, Broadway |
| 2010 | Pandora's Box | Pandora | The New York Musical Theatre Festival |
| 2012 | The Best Man | Mabel Cantwell | Gerald Schoenfeld Theatre, Broadway |
| 2013 | Ragtime | Evelyn Nesbit | Avery Fisher Hall, New York |
| 2013 | The Call | Annie | Playwrights Horizons, Off-Broadway |
| 2014 | Under My Skin | Melody Dent | Little Shubert Theatre, Off-Broadway |
| 2015 | Clinton: The Musical | Hillary Rodham Clinton | New World Stages, Off-Broadway |
| 2016 | Disaster! | Marianne Wilson | Nederlander Theatre, Broadway |
| 2017–2018 | Mean Girls | Mrs. Heron / Ms. Norbury / Mrs. George | National Theatre, Washington, D.C. August Wilson Theatre, Broadway |
| 2018–2020 | Beetlejuice | Barbara Maitland | National Theatre, Washington, D.C. Winter Garden Theatre, Broadway |
| 2022–2023 | Beetlejuice | Barbara Maitland | Marquis Theatre, Broadway |
| 2024 | Gutenberg! The Musical! | The Guest Producer | James Earl Jones Theatre, Broadway One night appearance |
| 2024 | Mama, I'm a Big Girl Now! | Herself | New World Stages, Off-Broadway |
| 2025 | Heathers: The Musical | Ms. Fleming / Veronica's Mom | New World Stages, Off-Broadway |
| 2025 | Bat Boy: The Musical | Meredith Parker | New York City Center, Off-Broadway |
| 2025-2026 | Heathers: The Musical | Ms. Fleming / Veronica's Mom | New World Stages, Off-Broadway |

=== Film ===
| Year | Title | Role | Notes |
|---|---|---|---|
| 2000 | Borough of Kings | Anna Callahan | |
| 2001 | Campfire Stories | Beatrice | |
| 2001 | Second Honeymoon | Jennifer Luckenbill | |
| 2018 | The Miseducation of Cameron Post | Ruth Post | |
| 2018 | Mapplethorpe | Holly Solomon | |
| 2022 | Honor Society | Janet Rose | |

=== Television ===
| Year | Title | Role | Notes |
|---|---|---|---|
| 1986–2014 | Sesame Street | Charlotte/Ms. Camp/Herself | 3 episodes |
| 1995 | Princess Gwenevere and the Jewel Riders | Princess Gwenevere (voice) | 13 episodes |
| 2000–2007 | One Life to Live | Heather/Claudia Reston | 6 episodes |
| 2008 | Lipstick Jungle | Reese | 2 episodes |
| 2009 | 30 Rock | Lyle | Episode: "Jackie Jormp-Jomp" |
| 2009 | Cupid | Debbie | Episode: "My Fair Masseuse" |
| 2010 | Blue Bloods | Mary Jo Clarkson | Episode: "What You See" |
| 2011 | Rescue Me | Marsha | Episode: "Ashes" |
| 2012 | Submissions Only | Auditioner | Episode: "Another Interruption" |
| 2013 | White Collar | Leslie | Episode: "The Original" |
| 2013–2024 | Law & Order: Special Victims Unit | Ariel Randolph/Denise Lynch | 2 episodes |
| 2014 | The Mysteries of Laura | Mrs. Sullivan | Episode: "The Mystery of the Fertility Fatality" |
| 2014 | Elementary | Astrid | Episode: "End of Watch" |
| 2014 | Wallykazam! | Nancy the Naughty Noodle (voice) | Episode: ”The Nice Ninjas” |
| 2015 | The Mindy Project | Ann Marie Zoey Kimball-Kinney | Episode: "Jody Kimball-Kinney is My Husband" |
| 2016 | Gilmore Girls: A Year in the Life | Claudia | 2 episodes |
| 2023 | The Marvelous Mrs. Maisel | Tuppance | Episode: “Susan” |
| 2024 | American Sports Story: Aaron Hernandez | Shelley Meyer | 2 episodes |

=== Video games ===
| Year | Title | Role | Notes |
|---|---|---|---|
| 2006 | Rockstar Games Presents Table Tennis | Haley | |
| 2018 | Red Dead Redemption 2 | The Local Pedestrian Population | |

==== Demos, readings, concerts, and workshops ====
- Vape! The Grease Parody
- PUCK’D: A Middle-Aged Summer Night’s Dream
- The American Football Musical
- Angel of Arkansas
- Smash
- A Very Brady Musical
- Broadway Vacation
- Seeing Red
- Beetlejuice
- The Best Little Whorehouse in Texas
- Hazel
- Clinton: The Musical
- Big
- Ragtime
- Cinderella
- Through the Door
- Romy and Michele's High School Reunion
- The Dogs of Pripyat
- The Green Heart
- Hollywood Lies
- The Nutty Professor
- The Front
- Catch Me If You Can
- Baby
- Xanadu
- One Step Forward
- In Your Dreams
- The Little Mermaid
- Pandora's Box
- The Man in the White Suit
- Legally Blonde: The Musical
- The Wedding Singer
- Easter Rising
- Robber Bridegroom
- Piece
- Taboo
- Bright Lights, Big City
- Le Passe Muraille (later named Amour)

=== Cast recordings ===
- Bat Boy - Original Off-Broadway Cast, 2001
- Prodigal - Original Off-Broadway Cast, 2003
- Hairspray - Original Broadway Cast, 2003
- Little Shop of Horrors - New Broadway Cast, 2004
- Anna Karenina - The Broadway Musical, 2007
- Xanadu - Original Broadway Cast, 2007
- Dear Edwina - World Premiere Cast, 2008
- Catch Me If You Can - Original Broadway Cast, 2011
- Clinton: The Musical - Original Off-Broadway Cast, 2015
- Disaster! - Original Broadway Cast, 2016
- Mean Girls: The Musical - Original Broadway Cast, 2018
- Beetlejuice - Original Broadway Cast, 2019
- The Griswolds' Broadway Vacation: The Musical - Original Concept Album, 2025
- Bat Boy: The Musical - New York City Center Cast, 2026

=== Solo album ===
- Faith, Trust & Pixie Dust - Released on May 13, 2008

Track Listing:

1. "This Only Happens in the Movies"
2. "When You Wish Upon a Star"
3. "I'll Try"
4. "Call Me a Princess"
5. "Colors of the Wind"
6. "It's a Small World"/"God Help the Outcasts"
7. "Baby Mine"
8. "Minnie's Yoo Hoo"
9. "Second Star to the Right"
10. "The Bare Necessities"
11. "When She Loved Me"
12. "Disneyland"

=== Other recordings ===
- Featured on Sleep Well Tonight: Lullabies for Little Dreamers - "Sleep Safe Tonight"; "Hush Little Baby"; "All The World Is Sleeping"; "Lambs Are Sleeping", duet with Kaitlin Hopkins; "Meet Me on the Other Side"; "Moon Sun", 2002
- Featured on Jamie deRoy & Friends: Volume 4: Family - "The Portrait", 2002
- Featured on Jamie deRoy & Friends: Volume 5: Animal Tracks - "Lion Tamer", 2003
- Featured on Jamie deRoy & Friends: Volume 6: When I Grow Up - "Some Shoes Are Harder Than Others to Fill", 2005
- Featured on NEO: New, Emerging, Outstanding - "Any Day", duet with Laura Bell Bundy and "Inside Your Heart", duet with Deven May, 2005
- Featured on Guy Haines' New Guy in Town - "Sure Thing", duet with Guy Haines, 2005
- Featured on The Broadway Musicals of 1945 - "Here I Go Again", duet with Eddie Korbich; "It Doesn't Cost Anything to Dream"; "Slightly Perfect", duet with Scott Ailing; "What's the Use of Wond'rin", duet with Marc Kudisch, 2007
- Featured on Carols for a Cure: Volume 9 - "Away in a Manger", 2007
- Featured on Ballroom Remixed - "Bad at Being Good", 2011
- Featured on Out of Our Heads: The Music of Kooman and Dimond - "I Think That He Likes Me", 2011
- Featured on Album by Joe Iconis - "The Saddest Girl in the World," 2022

== Awards and nominations ==
| Year | Award ceremony | Category | Show | Result |
|---|---|---|---|---|
| 1996 | Dora Award | Outstanding Female Performance in a Principal Role | Beauty and the Beast | Nominated |
| 2003 | Outer Critics Circle Award | Outstanding Featured Actress in a Musical | Hairspray | Nominated |
| 2003 | Drama Desk Award | Outstanding Featured Actress in a Musical | Hairspray | Nominated |
| 2003 | Clarence Derwent Award | Most Promising Female Performance | Hairspray | Won |
| 2004 | Outer Critics Circle Award | Outstanding Actress in a Musical | Little Shop of Horrors | Nominated |
| 2008 | Drama League Award | Distinguished Performance | Xanadu | Nominated |
| 2008 | Tony Award | Best Performance by a Leading Actress in a Musical | Xanadu | Nominated |
| 2011 | Drama Desk Award | Outstanding Featured Actress in a Musical | Catch Me If You Can | Nominated |
| 2018 | Outer Critics Circle Award | Outstanding Featured Actress in a Musical | Mean Girls | Nominated |
| 2025 | Drama Desk Award | Outstanding Revue | Mama, I'm A Big Girl Now! | Nominated |
| 2026 | Drama League Award | Distinguished Performance | Bat Boy: The Musical | Nominated |
