= Barnwood Builders =

American documentary television series

- Genre: Documentary television
- Country of origin: United States
- Original language: English

Production
- Running time: 40 minutes

Original release
- Network: Magnolia Network
- Release: November 1, 2013 – August 29, 2024

Barnwood Builders is an American documentary television series following a team of builders that remove logs and beams from old cabins and historic barns to use them when constructing modern houses. Originally produced for the DIY Network, by season 15, the series had been taken over by Magnolia Network which replaced the DIY Network and (as of 2023), is broadcast on Magnolia Network. The series is produced by Silent Crow Arts. The show was in the 19th season as of 2025.

== Premise ==
Barnwood Builders follows Mark Bowe, whose West Virginia company purchases old barns and log cabins in order to reuse the hand-hewn logs in modern housebuilding. His team specializes in the reclamation and restoration of pioneer era structures in the eastern United States.

== Cast ==
- Sean McCourt (narrator)
- Mark Bowe (Main Seasons 1-present)
- Sherman Thompson (Main Seasons 1-present)
- Johnny Jett (Main Seasons 1-present)
- Graham Ferguson (Main Seasons 1-present)
- Tim Rose (Main Seasons 1-12)
- Alex Webb (Recurring Season 3, Main Seasons 4-12)
- Brian Buckner (Main Season 1, Recurring Season 2)
- Travis Ferguson (Recurring Seasons 7-10)
- Teeshawn McKoy (Recurring Seasons 11-14)
- Ryan Franklin (Recurring Season 12, Main Seasons 13-present)
- Evan Canterbury (Main Seasons 13-present)

== Seasons ==
Season	Episodes	First Aired	Last Aired
1	9	November 1, 2013	December 9, 2014
2	13	October 11, 2015	December 27, 2015
3	13	April 24, 2016	July 24, 2016
4	13	October 30, 2016	February 19, 2017
5	13	June 11, 2017	September 3, 2017
6	13	November 26, 2017	April 29, 2018
7	13	July 15, 2018	October 7, 2018
8	13	April 7, 2019	July 7, 2019
9	5	August 4, 2019	2019
10	8	2020	2020
11	8	2020	2020
12	10	2021	2021
13	6	2021	2021
14	7	2021	2022
15	12	2022	2022
16	8	2023	2023
17	6	2023	2024
18	6	2024	2024
19	12	2024	2024

Seasons 1-5

- A crew of West Virginia master craftsmen travel all over the country to salvage antique cabins and barns.

Season 6

- A crew of West Virginia master craftsmen travel all over the country to salvage antique cabins and barns. In the season finale, the Barnwood Builders sit down to discuss their favorite things: cabins and barns. They reveal never before seen footage and are joined by some of their favorite special guests.

Season 7

- A crew of West Virginia master craftsmen travel all over the country to salvage antique cabins and barns. In the final two episodes of Season 7, the Barnwood Builders take on their hardest build yet. They construct a giant timber frame house for Project Healing Waters, a place where wounded veterans recover from PTSD and other battle injuries.

Season 8

- Episode 4, Mark works with a client who appeared on a previous episode to build a new boneyard in Texas. In the season finale at the boneyard in West Virginia, they build some walls to protect the wood from the outdoor elements.

Season 9

- Episode 1, Mark worked with teachers and administrator of West Virginia University to build a cabin that can be used to show the history of the early days of America.
