= Clinton: The Musical =

- Official art of off-Broadway run
- Music: Paul Hodge
- Lyrics: Paul Hodge
- Book: Paul Hodge; Michael Hodge
- Basis: Presidency of Bill Clinton
- Productions: 2012 Edinburgh Festival Fringe; 2013 Off-West End; 2014 New York Musical Theatre Festival; 2015 Off-Broadway; 2016 Perth

Clinton: The Musical is a satiric musical with music and lyrics by Paul Hodge, and a book by Paul Hodge and Michael Hodge. The musical is based on the presidency of Bill Clinton. After success in various festivals, the show played Off-Broadway in the spring of 2015.

== Background ==
The musical is based on the premise that there are two sides to Bill Clinton: the mature and charismatic side ("WJ") and the fun and reckless side ("Billy") that are invisible to every other character except Hillary Clinton. Imagining the two personalities as distinct characters, the musical follows the two Bill Clintons and Hillary through the major events of Bill Clinton's presidency.

== Synopsis ==
=== Act 1 ===
As the show begins, Hillary Rodham Clinton introduces herself and her husband, William Jefferson "Bill" Clinton. She reveals that Bill is actually two personalities, WJ and Billy, and that she is the only person who can see both of them ("Overture"). With help from Hillary, WJ and Billy win the 1992 presidential election ("Awful-Awesome"). After arriving at the White House, WJ states his plans to be a serious and successful president, Hillary states her plan to be loved by the American people, and Billy states his plan to "get some tail" ("The Me I See"). In order to remain focused on his job, WJ starts ignoring Billy's fun-loving urges.

Just a few days after being inaugurated, the media starts reporting on the Whitewater scandal, despite the fact that nobody who is reporting has any idea what the scandal actually is, and are just stretching the story out to gain viewers ("The Day After That"). Kenneth Starr is hired to investigate the scandal. Starr announces to the audience that he doesn't actually care about the American people or the Whitewater scandal, he's just in it for the fame ("A Starr is Born").

Hillary becomes increasingly worried that Billy will use his new office to cheat on her. As WJ reassures Hillary that he'll control Billy, Billy seduces White House intern Monica Lewinsky in the Oval Office ("Lie to You"). In order to comfort Hillary, WJ tells her that she can write the country's new healthcare plan. Republican Newt Gingrich is infuriated by this, and he works with Ken Starr to rally other Republicans and take control of the Congress majority ("Say Nay"). During an encounter with Billy in the Oval Office, Monica Lewinsky exclaims that she can't believe she's having an affair with the president ("Monica's Song"). WJ finds out about this and confronts Billy, starting an argument between the two. Hillary finds out about their fight and explains to them that "the public likes it better when politicians work together" ("Both Ways"). After settling his differences with Billy, WJ confronts Newt Gingrich and convinces him to pass Hillary's healthcare bill. WJ and Billy are reelected in the presidential election of 1996, but Billy is the only one that takes the oath of office, which means Billy is able to start ignoring WJ as payback for the beginning of their first term ("Both Ways (Reprise)").

=== Act 2 ===
As his second term begins, Billy celebrates in the Oval Office, while Linda Tripp secretly collects evidence of his affair with Monica ("What Could Go Wrong?"). Linda's evidence becomes public, but Billy attempts to convince the American people that the affair never happened ("That Woman, Miss Lewinsky"). Since he is officially the president, Billy must give the State of the Union address, a job WJ had previously done. Billy can't resist making sexual innuendos while writing his speech, so Hillary is forced to write the address and let Billy take all the credit ("State of the Union").

Having been abandoned by Billy and the American people, WJ reflects on all the things he was hoping to accomplish in his second term ("A Place Called Hope"). Monica, whom Billy has also abandoned, looks back on how confident he made her feel during their affair ("Monica's Song (Reprise)"). Hillary becomes increasingly angry at both WJ and Billy for the things they do behind her back. Though she still loves them, she decides she can't handle the stress anymore and tells the audience that she plans to divorce them ("Enough"). Meanwhile, Kenneth and Newt lead the movement to impeach and remove Billy from office ("Sexual Relations").

Hillary is visited by a vision of Eleanor Roosevelt, who tries to convince her to stay with Billy and WJ, but Hillary misinterprets Eleanor and instead decides that she's going to run for president ("Brew It for Your Country"). Billy and WJ realize that their legacy will not be the work they did to advance universal healthcare, but instead, they will always be remembered for Billy's affair ("The Me I See / What Could Go Wrong? (Reprise)"). WJ and Billy forgive each other and apologize to Hillary. The three decide that the only way to ensure that Billy remains in office is to reveal to the world that William Jefferson Clinton is, in fact, two people. Newt is hesitant to forgive the Clintons but is forced to when WJ reveals Newt's affair with Calista Bisek. The Senate votes to keep Billy in office and Hillary announces her 2008 candidacy for president ("Finale").

== Productions ==
=== Pre Off-Broadway ===
Clinton: The Musical premiered at the 2012 Edinburgh Festival Fringe in a one-act version, where it was nominated for Best New Musical. The two-act version premiered at the King's Head Theatre in London, where it played April 27, May 4, and May 11, 2013.

The show was then performed at the 2014 New York Musical Theatre Festival, where it sold-out performances and received several extensions. Duke LaFoon and Karl Kenzler played the two sides of Bill Clinton, while Alet Taylor played Hillary Clinton. It was directed by Adam Arian and choreographed by Emily McNamara. David Woolard was the costume designer, David Gallo the scenic designer, Greg Mitchell the lighting designer, Shannon Slaton the sound designer, and James Dobinson the music director. Joe Twist did the orchestrations.

There was an industry reading of the show in New York on November 6 and 7, 2014. Duke LaFoon, Kara Guy, and Kevin Zak reprised their roles from NYMF. Kerry Butler played Hillary Clinton, while Alan Campbell and Duke LaFoon played the two sides of Bill Clinton. It was directed and choreographed by Dan Knechtges.

=== Off-Broadway ===
In 2015, it was announced that Clinton: The Musical would be brought to Off-Broadway at New World Stages, previews beginning March 25, and opening on April 9. Duke LaFoon reprised his role as Billy, with Tom Galantich as WJ and Kerry Butler as Hillary Clinton. Dan Knechtges returned as director and choreographer. There was a new creative team in place, except for David Woolard returning as costume designer and James Dobinson returning as music director. Beowulf Boritt did the scenic design, Paul Miller the lighting design, and Peter Fitzgerald the sound design. Neil Douglas Reilly made new orchestrations with keyboard programming and electronic music design by Brian Li and Qingyang Xi. The show closed on June 21, 2015, making just over a 10-week run.

=== Other productions ===
In 2016, Clinton: The Musical had its Australian premiere in Perth at the State Theatre Centre of Western Australia by the Black Swan State Theatre Company. Directed by Adam Mitchell, the production opened on August 27.

== Principal roles and major casts ==
Character	NYMF	Original Off-Broadway	Perth
Billy Clinton	Duke Lafoon	Duke Lafoon	Matt Dyktynski
WJ Clinton	Karl Kenzler	Tom Galantich	Simon Burke
Hillary Clinton	Alet Taylor	Kerry Butler	Lisa Adam
Newt Gingrich	Tom Souhrada	John Treacy Egan	Luke Hewitt
Eleanor Roosevelt	Kara Guy	Judy Gold	Clare Moore
Kenneth Starr	Kevin Zak	Kevin Zak	Brendan Hanson
Monica Lewinsky	Natalie Gallo	Veronica Kuehn	Megan Kozak
Dick Morris	John Gregorio		

== Musical numbers ==
Act I

- "Overture"
- "Awful-Awesome" - Company
- "The Me I See" - WJ, Billy, Hillary, Ensemble
- "The Day After That" - Company
- "A Starr Is Born" - Kenneth Starr
- "Lie to You" - WJ, Billy, Hillary, Monica
- "Say Nay" - Newt
- "Monica's Song" - Monica, Ensemble
- "Both Ways" - Hillary, WJ
- "Both Ways (reprise)" - Company

Act II

- "What Could Go Wrong?" - Billy, Hillary, Ensemble
- "That Woman, Miss Lewinsky" - Billy, Ensemble
- "State of the Union" - Billy, Hillary
- "A Place Called Hope" - WJ, Ensemble
- "Monica's Song (reprise)" - Monica
- "Enough" - Hillary
- "Sexual Relations" - Kenneth Starr, Newt, Billy, Ensemble
- "Brew It for Your Country" - Eleanor, Hillary
- "The Me I See (reprise)/ What Could Go Wrong? (reprise)" - WJ, Billy
- "Finale" - Company

== Awards and nominations ==
Year	Ceremony	Category	Nominee	Result
2012	Edinburgh Festival Fringe	Best New Musical		Nominated
2016	Lucille Lortel Awards	Outstanding Featured Actor in a Musical	Kevin Zak	Nominated
