= Bat Boy: The Musical =

1997 American horror rock musical

- Original Off-Broadway windowcard
- Music: Laurence O'Keefe
- Lyrics: Laurence O'Keefe
- Book: Keythe Farley; Brian Flemming
- Basis: Weekly World News's Bat Boy
- Productions: 1997 World Premiere (Los Angeles); 2001 Off-Broadway; 2003 St. Louis; 2004 West End; 2021 Auckland; 2025 Off-Broadway
- Awards: Lucille Lortel Award; 2 Richard Rodgers Awards; Outer Critics Circle Award

Bat Boy: The Musical is an American horror rock musical with a book by Keythe Farley and Brian Flemming and music and lyrics by Laurence O'Keefe, based on a June 23, 1992 Weekly World News story about a half-boy, half-bat, dubbed "Bat Boy", who grew up living in a cave.

Bat Boy premiered at Actors' Gang Theatre in 1997 and has since been produced off-Broadway, in London's West End, at the Edinburgh Festival and in scores of productions throughout the world.

== Production history ==
Bat Boy: The Musical was developed at the Directors Company and premiered at Tim Robbins' Actors' Gang Theatre on October 31, 1997. Directed by Keythe Farley and choreographed by Derick LaSalla, the cast featured Deven May as Bat Boy and Kaitlin Hopkins as Meredith Parker.

The musical opened off-Broadway at the Union Square Theatre on March 21, 2001, and closed on December 2, 2001. Produced by Robyn Goodman, Michael Alden, RIOT Entertainment (Cori Gardner, Dave Clemmons, Scott Schwartz), and Nancy Nagel Gibbs, and directed by Scott Schwartz, with choreography by Christopher Gattelli, the cast featured Deven May as Bat Boy and Kaitlin Hopkins as Meredith, Sean McCourt as Dr. Thomas Parker, Kerry Butler as Shelley Parker, Kathy Brier as Maggie/Ron Taylor, Daria Hardeman as Ruthie Taylor/Ned, Trent Armand Kendall as Rev. Hightower/Mrs. Taylor/Roy/Institute Man, Jim Price as Bud/Daisy/Pan, Richard Pruitt as Sheriff, Doug Storm as Rick Taylor/Lorraine. The swings and understudies included Leslie Kritzer, John Treacy Egan, Stephanie Kurtzuba, Gavin Creel, Chad Kimball, and J.P. Potter. The show was musically directed/keyboards by Alex Lacamoire, keyboards/assistant musical director Jason Debord, acoustic/ electric guitars Greg Skaff, electric bass Matt Rubano, drums Ed Fast. For the original cast album, the band was augmented by cello (Jeanne LeBlanc), French horn (Jeff Lang), flute/clarinet/oboe (C. Anderson), trumpet (Robert Millikan), and trombone (James E. Pugh).

The musical opened in the West End at the Shaftesbury Theatre on September 8, 2004, and ran through January 15, 2005. It again starred Deven May as Bat Boy, along with Rebecca Vere as Meredith, Johnny Barr as Dr. Parker and Emma Williams as Shelley. It had previously played at the West Yorkshire Playhouse.

It entered regional theatre in 2002 beginning with the Phoenix Theatre in Indianapolis, followed by New Line Theatre in St. Louis, Missouri, in 2003, 2006 and 2025. Performance rights are currently administered by Dramatists Play Service.

From October to November 2025, the show was revived at New York City Center directed by Alex Timbers. The production starred Taylor Trensch in the title role opposite Kerry Butler as Meredith, Gabi Carrubba, Christopher Sieber, Alex Newell, Andrew Durand, Mary Faber, Tom McGowan and Marissa Jaret Winokur.

== Background ==
The Weekly World News 1992 story about Bat Boy, a half-boy, half-bat found living in a cave inspired writers Keythe Farley and Brian Flemming to write a stage adaptation. They were joined by American composer/lyricist Laurence O'Keefe, and their first production premiered on Halloween, 1997.

The 2004 London production introduced significant changes to the script and score, including the replacement of the song "Inside Your Heart" with "Mine, All Mine". The 2025 New York City Center production replaced "Dance With Me, Darling" with "Fly With Me", replaced the townsfolk's song "Another Dead Cow" with "He Is Here", cut the Act 1 songs "Ugly Boy," "Whatcha Wanna Do" and "Mrs. Taylor's Lullaby", and added the new Act 1 song "Deer In The Headlights".

The musical differs in a few of its plot details from the Weekly World News portrayal of Bat Boy. In the musical, Bat Boy learns to speak from his adoptive family, yearns for acceptance and tries to join society, only to face hatred and violence from a town that fears him and jealous rage from his foster father.

The book deals with serious themes (such as hypocrisy, acceptance, forgiveness, racism, revenge and scapegoating) but often punctures the most serious moments with slapstick, surrealism, camp-horror and irony. The show also contains religious themes with biblical allusions, such as the quoting of Psalm 23 and Genesis 9:4 in scene 9. Act II begins with a religious revival tent meeting featuring a faith healer.

The score was written to be played by a five-piece band of guitar, two keyboards, bass and drums, but the original cast album (RCA Records) contains seven extra instruments (cello, flute, clarinet, oboe, French horn, trumpet, trombone). The music covers many styles, from rock to rap to horror-movie film score and opera. The musical was written to be performed by a cast of 10, with six men and four women playing all the roles.

The 2025 City Center production had a cast of 17 with three offstage swings, and a band of 12.

== Synopsis ==
=== Act I ===
In the fictional town of Hope Falls, West Virginia, three teenage spelunkers, Ron, Rick and Ruthie Taylor, discover the Bat Boy, a deformed humanoid creature. Bat Boy attacks Ruthie and is taken captive by Rick and Ron ("Hold Me Bat Boy"). Ruthie is taken to the hospital, and the Bat Boy is placed in the care of Sheriff Reynolds who brings him to the home of local veterinarian Dr. Parker. Meredith, Dr. Parker's wife, agrees to take him in ("Christian Charity").

Shelley, the Parkers' teenage daughter, is repulsed by the Bat Boy and infuriated by his constant screaming, but Meredith pities him and christens him with a new name: Edgar ("Ugly Boy"). Rick Taylor, Shelley's boyfriend, arrives and, infuriated by Edgar's presence, threatens to kill him with a knife ("Whatcha Wanna Do?"). This upsets Shelley, and Meredith makes Rick leave. Meredith attempts to comfort Edgar ("A Home For You").

Meanwhile, the Mayor of Hope Falls and the local ranchers are worried by their cattle which are dying inexplicably. The rumours of the discovery of a Bat Boy lead them to believe he must be preying on the cattle ("Another Dead Cow").

Dr. Parker returns home and is about to euthanize Edgar when Meredith intervenes. Meredith begs Dr. Parker not to kill Edgar, and he consents when she agrees to sleep with him. Dr. Parker celebrates what he sees as an upturn in his failing marriage and feeds Edgar animal blood ("Dance With Me Darling"). At the hospital, Ruthie is delirious from her injuries, but her mother promises the Sheriff will kill the Bat Boy or be fired ("Mrs. Taylor's Lullaby").

With the help of Meredith's patient teaching and Dr. Parker's secret feedings of blood, Edgar learns speech, etiquette and how to dress and obtains a high-school equivalency diploma ("Show You A Thing or Two"). The town council implore Dr. Parker to prevent the reviled Edgar from attending the upcoming revival meeting. Dr. Parker protests, insisting Edgar is not a threat to anyone, but is pressured into giving his word that Edgar will not attend the revival ("Christian Charity (Reprise)")

Edgar begs the Parkers to let him go to the revival ("A Home For You (Reprise)"), and Meredith eventually relents. Incensed by Meredith undermining his word, Dr. Parker grabs her aggressively, and Edgar instinctively attacks him. Meredith runs to comfort Edgar over her husband, leaving Dr. Parker humiliated and furious. Dr. Parker begins to devise a way to destroy Edgar and save his marriage to Meredith; he taunts a hungry Edgar with a live rabbit, and Edgar struggles with his feral urges to kill. Just as it seems Edgar is overcoming his hunger, Dr. Parker draws blood from the rabbit and Edgar eats it. Dr. Parker gives Ruthie Taylor a lethal injection in her hospital room, intending to blame her death on Edgar ("Comfort and Joy").

=== Act II ===
At the revival meeting Reverend Hightower offers a faith healing ("A Joyful Noise"). Meredith, Shelley and Edgar arrive, and Edgar volunteers himself for the faith healing. The town are disgusted by his presence, but Edgar implores them to accept him ("Let Me Walk Among You"). The townsfolk are won over by Edgar's eloquence and civility and embrace him ("A Joyful Noise (Reprise)").

Dr. Parker arrives at the revival and reveals Ruthie has died, blaming her death on Edgar. The townsfolk are furious and once again turn on Edgar. In the ensuing struggle Edgar attacks Rick Taylor; under the pretense of tending to his wounds, Dr. Parker administers Rick with a lethal injection to serve as further proof that Edgar is dangerous. The townsfolk form a mob, led by Dr. Parker, and pursue Edgar into the woods.

In the woods Shelley and Meredith look for Edgar. Together they decide that they will run away from Hope Falls and Dr. Parker. Shelley tells Meredith she is falling in love with Edgar, and Meredith's horrified response causes Shelley to run away deeper into the woods ("Three Bedroom House"). There she meets Edgar, and the two comfort each other and confess their love for each other. The Greek God of nature Pan arrives to preside over the union of Edgar and Shelley, with the help of the woodland creatures ("Children, Children").

Ron Taylor, determined to get revenge for his brother and sister, searches the slaughterhouse for Edgar. The mob mistake the noise coming from the slaughterhouse as a sign of Edgar's presence, and Mrs. Taylor sets fire to the slaughterhouse, inadvertently burning her remaining child to death. The Sheriff asks Dr. Parker to placate the mob but, instead, he whips them into a bloodthirsty frenzy, and the hunt for Edgar resumes ("More Blood/Kill The Bat Boy!").

Back in the woods Edgar is hungry for blood and begs Shelley to leave him for her own safety. Instead Shelley offers her arm to Edgar for him to feed on ("Inside Your Heart"). Just as he is about to bite, Meredith arrives and reveals she is Edgar's mother. Overcome with grief and shame, Edgar kills a cow and runs away to the cave where he was discovered. Incensed at Dr. Parker's betrayal and Meredith's deceit, Edgar pledges to kill the pair of them and embrace his inner beast ("Apology To A Cow").

The mob arrives at the cave as do Dr. Parker and Meredith. Together they reveal to the town that Edgar was the result of an experiment gone wrong; a young Parker accidentally spilled a prototype pheromone on Meredith which caused him to go mad and sexually violate her. As Meredith ran home in tears, the pheromone also attracted a colony of bats that violated her as well. Nine months later she gave birth to Shelley and Edgar. Repulsed by the deformed Edgar, Meredith asked Parker to kill him, but he could not and instead left him at the mouth of the cave where the bats adopted him.

Edgar begs Dr. Parker to kill him, but he cannot; so Edgar reveals that he slept with Shelley. Furious and overcome with grief, Dr. Parker slits his own throat, causing Edgar to leap upon him and feed, whilst Dr. Parker stabs him in the back. Meredith tries to intervene but is stabbed as well, and the three fall to the ground, dead ("Finale: I Imagine You're Upset/I Am Not A Boy").

In the aftermath, Shelley and the townsfolk reflect on the tale and the lessons they have learned ("Hold Me Bat Boy (Reprise)").

== Casts ==
Roles	Off-Broadway	West End	New York City Center
Roles	2001	2004	2025
Bat Boy	Deven May	Deven May	Taylor Trensch
Meredith Parker	Kaitlin Hopkins	Rebecca Vere	Kerry Butler
Dr. Thomas Parker	Sean McCourt	John Barr	Christopher Sieber
Shelley Parker	Kerry Butler	Emma Williams	Gabi Carrubba
Sheriff Reynolds	Richard Pruitt	Andrew Bolton	Tom McGowan
Rick Taylor	Doug Storm	Gareth Edwards	Andrew Durand
Ron Taylor	Kathy Brier	Thomas Goodridge	John-Michael Lyles
Ruthie Taylor	Daria Hardeman	Julie Jupp	Olivia Puckett
Mrs. Taylor	Trent Armand Kendall	Maurey Richards	Marissa Jaret Winokur

== Characters ==
- Bat Boy - Also referred to as "Edgar". A bat boy.
- Meredith Parker - Wife to Thomas.
- Dr. Thomas Parker - The town veterinarian. Husband to Meredith.
- Shelley Parker - The rebellious daughter of Thomas and Meredith. Girlfriend of Rick. Falls in love with Edgar.
- Sheriff Reynolds - The local sheriff, coming up for re-election. Sometimes doubles as Delia.
- Rick Taylor - A rowdy, spelunking teenager. Kin to Ron and Ruthie, son of Mrs. Taylor. Boyfriend of Shelley. Commonly doubles as Lorraine and Mr. Dillon.
- Ron Taylor - A rowdy, spelunking teenager. Kin to Rick, and Ruthie, son of Mrs. Taylor. Usually a drag role. Commonly doubles as Maggie.
- Ruthie Taylor - A rowdy, spelunking teenager. Youngest of three. Kin to Rick and Ron, daughter of Mrs. Taylor. Commonly doubles as Ned.
- Mrs. Taylor - An overprotective, aggressive mother. Mother of Rick, Ron, and Ruthie. Usually a drag role. Commonly doubles as Reverend Hightower, Roy and Institute Man.

- Lorraine - A townswoman. Usually a drag role. Commonly doubles as Rick and Mr. Dillon.
- Delia - A townswoman. Usually a drag role. Sometimes doubles as Sheriff.
- Maggie - The mayor of Hope Falls. Commonly doubles as Ron.
- Daisy - A townswoman. Usually a drag role. Commonly doubles as Bud and Pan.
- Mr. Dillon - A rancher. Sometimes doubles as Lorraine and Rick.
- Bud - A rancher. Commonly doubles as Pan and Daisy.
- Ned - A rancher. Usually a drag role. Commonly doubles as Ruthie.
- Roy - A townsman. Often doubles as Mrs. Taylor and Rev. Hightower.
- Clem - A townsman. Usually a drag role. Often doubles as Ron and Maggie.
- Reverend Billy Hightower - A preacher and faith healer who holds a travelling Tent Revival/Barbecue. Commonly doubles as Mrs. Taylor and Roy.
- Pan - The Greek satyr-god of nature. Commonly doubles as Bud and Daisy.
- A Doctor - Commonly doubles as Bud, Daisy and Pan.
- Institute Man - Commonly doubles as Mrs. Taylor, Roy and Rev. Hightower.
- Chorus - Singer/dancers, additional townsfolk

=== Doubling ===
The musical is written for a cast of ten people to play all twenty-two roles. Except for the actors playing Bat Boy, Meredith, Dr. Parker and Shelley, every cast member plays multiple roles, including at least one of another gender. The cast breakdown is usually thus:

- Sheriff Reynolds/Delia (male actor)
- Rick Taylor/Lorraine/Mr. Dillon (male actor)
- Ron Taylor/Maggie/Clem (female actor)
- Ruthie Taylor/Ned (female actor)
- Mrs. Taylor/Roy/Reverend Billy Hightower/Institute Man (male actor)
- Daisy/Bud/Pan/Doctor (male actor)

== Songs ==
=== The Directors Company, The Directors Company Theatre 3, August 2000 ===
Act One

- "Hold Me, Bat Boy" - Full Company
- "Christian Charity" - Sheriff, Meredith, Shelley
- "Poor Little Dirty Little" - Hope Falls Townsfolk
- "Ugly Boy" - Shelley, Meredith, Rick
- "A Home for You" - Meredith, Bat Boy
- "Dance With Me, Darling" - Parker
- "Ugly Boy (reprise)" - Shelley, Bat Boy, Parker, Meredith
- "Show You a Thing or Two" - Bat Boy, Meredith, Shelley, Parker
- "Christian Charity (reprise)" - Townsfolk
- "A Home for You (reprise)" - Bat Boy
- "Comfort and Joy" - Full Company

Act Two

- "A Joyful Noise"* - Reverend Hightower, Townsfolk
- "Let Me Walk Among You" - Bat Boy
- "Three Bedroom House" - Meredith, Shelley
- "Children, Children" - Pan, Animals, Bat Boy, Shelley
- "More Blood/Kill the Bat Boy!" - Parker, Townsfolk
- "Let It Be Me" - Bat Boy, Shelley
- "Apology To A Cow" - Bat Boy
- "Revelations" - Full Company
- "Act II Finale: I Imagine You're Upset / Hold Me, Bat Boy (reprise)" - Full Company

=== Off-Broadway, Union Square Theatre, 2001 ===
Act One

- "Hold Me, Bat Boy" - Full Company
- "Christian Charity" - Sheriff, Meredith, Shelley
- "Ugly Boy" - Shelley
- "Watcha Wanna Do?" - Rick, Shelley
- "A Home for You" - Meredith, Bat Boy
- "Another Dead Cow" - Townsfolk
- "Dance With Me, Darling" - Parker
- "Ruthie's Lullaby" - Mrs. Taylor
- "Show You a Thing or Two" - Full Company
- "Christian Charity (reprise)" - Sheriff, Parker, Townsfolk
- "A Home for You (reprise)" - Bat Boy
- "Comfort and Joy" - Full Company

Act Two

- "A Joyful Noise"* - Reverend Hightower, The Congregation
- "Let Me Walk Among You" - Bat Boy
- "Three Bedroom House" - Meredith, Shelley
- "Children, Children" - King of the Forest, Company
- "More Blood" - Parker
- "Inside Your Heart" - Shelley, Bat Boy
- "Apology To A Cow" - Bat Boy
- "Revelations" - Meredith, Parker, Company
- "Act II Finale: I Imagine You're Upset / Hold Me, Bat Boy (reprise)" - Full Company

=== New York City Center, 2025 ===
Act One

- Overture - Orchestra
- "Hold Me, Bat Boy" - Shelley, Rick, Ron, Ruthie, Company
- "Christian Charity" - Sheriff, Shelley, Meredith, Mrs. Taylor, Rick, Ron, Ruthie
- "A Home for You" - Meredith, Bat Boy
- "Fly With Me" - Dr. Parker, Meredith, Bat Boy, Voices
- "Show You a Thing or Two" - Bat Boy, Meredith, Shelley, Dr. Parker, Company
- "He Is Here" - Ned, Maggie, Dr. Parker, Townspeople
- "Christian Charity (reprise)" - Sheriff, Maggie, Lorraine, Townspeople, Meredith, Dr. Parker
- "Deer in the Headlights" - Shelley, Bat Boy, Rick, Ron, Ruthie
- "A Home for You (reprise)" - Bat Boy
- "Parker's Epiphany" - Dr. Parker
- "Comfort and Joy" - Dr. Parker, Voices, Meredith, Shelley, Sheriff, Mrs. Taylor, Rick, Ron, Ruthie, Townspeople, Bat Boy

Act Two

- "A Joyful Noise" - Rev. Hightower, Townspeople
- "Let Me Walk Among You" - Bat Boy
- "A Joyful Noise (reprise)" - Bat Boy, Rev. Hightower, Townspeople
- "All Hell Breaks Loose" - Rick, Shelley, Townspeople
- "Stop The Bat Boy!" - Sheriff, Townspeople
- "Three Bedroom House" - Meredith, Shelley
- "Children, Children" - The God Pan, Animals, Bat Boy, Shelley
- "More Blood/Kill the Bat Boy!" - Dr. Parker, Townspeople
- "Mine, All Mine" - Shelley, Bat Boy
- "Apology To A Cow" - Bat Boy, Voices
- "Revelations" - Meredith, Dr. Parker, Voices
- "Act II Finale: I Imagine You're Upset / Hold Me, Bat Boy (reprise)" - Full Company

== Awards and critical reception ==
Bat Boy: The Musical won the awards for best Off-Broadway musical including the Lucille Lortel Award, two Richard Rodgers Awards from the American Academy of Arts and Letters, and the Outer Critics Circle Award in 2001. Regional productions of Bat Boy have been nominated for and won awards including the 2003 Elliot Norton Award (Boston, Massachusetts)., the 1998 LAWeekly Award for Best New Musical, and Best Musical (Small Theatre) at the 1998 Ovation Awards (Los Angeles).

The off-Broadway production received very positive reviews. In his review for The New York Times, Bruce Weber wrote, "It's remarkable what [this show's] intelligent wit can accomplish". John Lahr of The New Yorker called it "a giggling cult hit" and "the only play in the history of the theatre whose hero ends Act I with a rabbit in his mouth, and who moves on in Act II to an entire cow's head." Curtain-Up praised : "Laurence O'Keefe's peppy and melodic pop-rock score... played by a five piece combo". Deven May received the Theatre World Award for his performance as Bat Boy.

The West End reviews were less positive. The CurtainUp reviewer wrote, "[U]nless Bat Boy The Musical gathers a cult audience, I fear it will not linger. The newspaper critics do sometimes get it wrong, ... but they have been less kind to Bat Boy than the West Virginians portrayed in the musical." The subsequent sell-out 2006 Edinburgh Festival production of the revised score used in the West End received very positive reviews, with many suggesting the show suited this more 'scaled-down' style.
