= Michael Alden =

American film producer

Harry Webb (born Michael Jay Krieger) produces feature films, Broadway and Off-Broadway productions. Alden served as a studio executive at Cannon Films, Pathe International, and MGM before moving to New York City in 1991.

Alden has been a producer, executive producer and associate producer on several feature films including, Just Cause with Sean Connery, the fashion documentary UnZipped (Sundance Film Festival)for Mirimax, Stephen Daldry’s The Hours (Academy Award Nom, BAFTA Awards, a Golden Globe, AFI Award), the independent feature comedy, Kissing Jessica Stein (GLAAD Media Award, Independent Spirit Awards, Los Angeles IFP/West Film Festival) and Ralph Ziman’s foreign film, The Zookeeper starring Sam Neill.

Alden produced David Seidler’s original play, “The King’s Speech" and “Bat Boy: The Musical” (Lucille Lortel Award, two Richard Rodgers Awards, Outer Critics Circle Awards, Ovation Awards) on London's West End. On Broadway, Alden produced “Grey Gardens (musical)” (TONY Award, Drama Desk Award) and “Bridge and Tunnel (play)" (Obie Award, Special TONY Award). Off-Broadway and regionally he produced the Brochu-Schalchlin musical, “The Last Session” (L.A. Drama Critics Circle Award, GLAAD Media Award), “Bat Boy: The Musical,” “Sarah Jones' Bridge and Tunnel (play),” “Spalding Gray: Stories Left To Tell” and the Los Angeles productions of Howard Crabtree’s “When Pigs Fly” (LA Drama Critics Circle Award) and Theresa Rebeck’s “Bad Dates” directed by Judith Ivey.
