= Weekly World News =

American tabloid publication

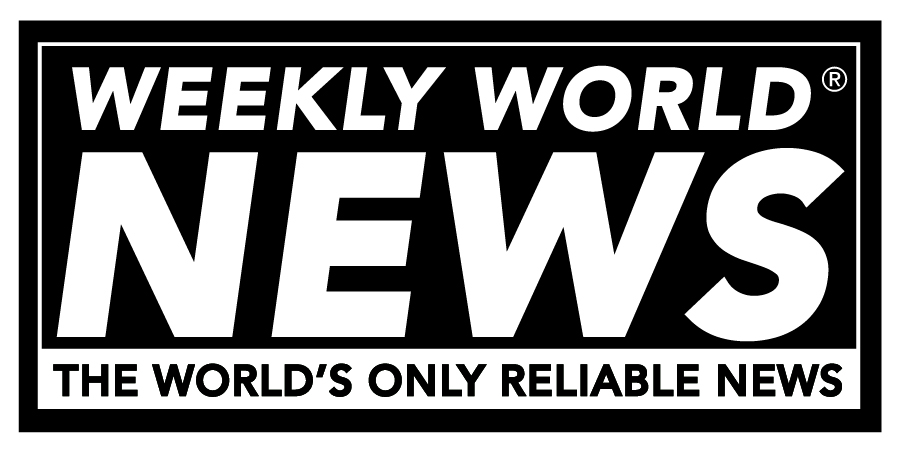

- August 15, 2005 cover
- Editor-in-chief: Greg D'Alessandro (2019–present)
- Categories: Supernatural, paranormal, tabloid, satire, humour
- Frequency: Weekly (1979–2007); Bi-weekly
- Total circulation: 1.2 million (in its peak)
- Founder: Generoso Pope, Jr.
- First issue: October 16, 1979; 47 years ago
- Final issue: August 27, 2007; 19 years ago, continues online and on social media
- Company: American Media (1979–2007); SpyCat LLC (2008–present)
- Country: United States
- Based in: Los Angeles and New York
- Language: English
- Website: www.weeklyworldnews.com
- ISSN: 0199-574X
- OCLC: 6010349

The Weekly World News is a tabloid formerly published in a newspaper format reporting mostly fictional "news" stories in the United States from 1979 to 2007. The paper was renowned for its outlandish cover stories often based on supernatural or paranormal themes and an approach to news that verged on the satirical. Its characteristic black-and-white covers have become pop-culture images widely used in the arts. It ceased print publication in August 2007. The company has a library of 110,000+ articles and 300+ original characters.

In 2009, the Weekly World News was relaunched as an online and social media publication. In July 2021, the Weekly World News announced the formation of Weekly World News Studios, to develop and produce entertainment projects based on its brand and characters.

== History ==
Generoso Pope Jr. launched the Weekly World News in 1979 to continue using the black-and-white press that sister tabloid The National Enquirer had been printed on before it switched to color printing. The WWN was published in Lantana, Florida, until it moved to Boca Raton in the late 1990s. It was unique as a tabloid because it was printed entirely in black and white. Eddie Clontz was its long-time editor, a 10th-grade dropout from North Carolina, and a former copy editor at small newspapers. In the 2000s, the circulation of WWN peaked at 1.2 million per issue. WWN went on to thrive online from 2009 to 2015 and was relaunched in 2019 by senior editor Greg D'Alessandro, along with investor David Collins.

The editor-in-chief from 2009 to 2018 was Neil McGinness. The editor-in-chief since August 2019 has been D'Alessandro.

== General approach to stories ==
The WWN traditionally claimed that it always printed the truth, but many stories appeared to have comedic intent – more so as time went by. As recalled by Joe Berger, a former White House correspondent who served as a WWN editor from 1981 to 2001, "About 80 percent of the stories were clipped from newspapers. We had three or four clippers who were surrounded by mountains of newspapers. We spent the day looking at newspapers throughout the world, clipping weird stories. About 50 percent were about people narrowly escaping death; someone falling off a cliff, or hanging off a tree branch for four days until they were rescued." The introduction to Batboy Lives! states that one person would read the tabloid for real news, whereas another would read it for the humor. The tabloid's main rival Sun carried a fine print disclaimer, whereas the WWN never publicly contradicted the accuracy of its own stories until 2004, when it began stating that "the reader should suspend disbelief for the sake of enjoyment." In the 2000s, Sun moved more toward articles on health and miracle cures, leaving WWN alone in its niche of supernatural news stories, such as sightings of Elvis Presley and the Loch Ness monster.

Thus, for a significant percentage of its content, the WWN ran strange-but-true stories, such as "DEVOUT CHRISTIAN ATTACKED – AND HE'S THE ONE FINED!" referring to British street evangelist Harry Hammond. Other verifiable stories included those of a giant mutant hog monster attacking Georgia and the arrest of a Tallahassee, Florida, man whose pants were on fire at the time. It reported on the discovery of an infant dragon preserved in formaldehyde proving the existence of dragons, although this was later proven to be a hoax. It also quoted Vatican exorcist Father Gabriele Amorth on Pope John Paul II's battles with Satan and ran a story on the trademark dispute between O, The Oprah Magazine and a German erotic periodical also named O. Whether partially fictional or wholly true, the writing style remained as fact-based as possible. As writer Bob Lind recalled for Mental Floss, "We wrote these things straight, for people who wanted to believe these things. We wrote it like a news story. We wrote a lede with a dash in it, filled it in, and then had a money quote."

In February 1989, WWN published real, graphic photos on its front page of the post-autopsied body of executed serial killer Ted Bundy. Managing editor Eddie Clontz defended his decision to run the photos, claiming that he hoped that such images would deter other murderers. Angry and surprised officials in Florida vowed to catch the person responsible, eventually arresting a low-level employee of the Alachua County, Florida Medical Examiner's office and charging him with taking the photographs and selling them to the WWN.

As other supermarket tabloids switched to celebrity gossip, the Weekly World News remained devoted to its original content, refusing to fact-check its way out of a sensational story, or, as Iain Calder, WWN co-founder and Enquirer editor-in-chief from 1973 to 1997, told Mental Floss: "We'd say Elvis was still alive and run a picture of what Elvis would have looked like at that time. We'd get dozens of phone calls. If someone calls and says, 'I saw Elvis,' you didn't try to disprove the headline." Derrik Lang, a stringer for the paper, said that "everything in my stories was fake – you know, depending on how you define fake." Common WWN stories involved alien abductions, the Loch Ness Monster, Bigfoot, time travel, predictions of an oncoming depression or apocalypse, and other newly found lost prophecies or religious relics. There were also characters who, in later years, became stock fixtures in WWN news stories, most famously Bat Boy, a hybrid creature discovered in West Virginia caverns, and P'lod, an extraterrestrial who became involved in Earth politics and had an affair with Hillary Clinton.

== Columns and features ==
Regular columns included Ed Anger (opinion), first Dear Babs and later Dear Dotti (outspoken advice columnists), Hi Dolly (relationship advice), Horse Sense (medical advice), Monkey Business (financial and business-related advice and information) and Madame Malisa (psychic). The most famous of these was Ed Anger, a character created in 1979 by staffer Rafe Klinger; Anger was a perpetually angry conservative (a typical column began "I'm pig-biting mad!"), who railed against illegal immigrants, women, speed limits and rainforests, among many other perceived ills.

Beginning on May 9, 2005, the Weekly World News went "All New" along with other tabloid papers such as the National Enquirer, which had become "Bigger • Bolder • Better." In the new Weekly World News, Serena and Sonya Sabak's psychic column was replaced by the horoscopes of Madame Malisa, and Dotti Primrose's "Dear Dotti" was supplanted by an advice column called "Hi Dolly" written by a middle-aged Southern blonde woman. The new WWN included a weekly "Weird Picture Search" by Mad cartoonist Sergio Aragonés. Other features included Trivia, Test Yourself, Jokes, and "Miss Adventure", a.k.a. "The Gayest American Hero", who has penetrated the mob, gone to Hollywood, and fought DRAG-U-LA traveling from the depths of the Earth's center to outer space.

Two pages of comic strips were spun off from feature stories. For two years, in 2004 and 2005, Peter Bagge created a Bat Boy comic "using celebrities and current events and creating totally absurd and implausible stories and situations for them." In 2011, IDW Publishing released a hardcover collection of Bagge's strips. "SpyCat", created by Dick Siegel, was drawn by Ernie Colón. SpyCat spoke nine different languages ranging from Persian to "dog" and was armed with "Adamwestium" claws and deadly cat-of-nine-tails. He wrote free-form poetry when not waging war on America's enemies—at home and abroad. "Matthew Daemon", also created by Dick Siegel, was written and illustrated by Mike Collins and was a spinoff from the "SOS Matthew Daemon (Seeker of Obscure Supernaturals)" feature. Daemon's lair was located beneath Grant's Tomb. Daemon specialized in B-List Monster hunting. "Alien Baby" by Craig Boldman chronicled the adventures of Moogera the deadbeat alien dad, alien baby Ethan, and Stacy, his Earth-born mother.

Though it mainly featured offbeat stories, it also featured legitimate games and quizzes such as crossword puzzles, a segment called "Bedside Manner" where readers choose which celebrity is best suited for the featured celebrity and "Mystery Eyes" which featured photographs of five pairs of eyes which belonged to celebrities and readers have to guess who they are.

== Recurring subjects ==
=== Bat Boy ===
Bat Boy was first featured in a 1992 issue after being found in a cave in West Virginia (Lost World Caverns). He has since led police on a high-speed chase, fought in the war on terror, led the troops to capture Saddam Hussein, bitten Santa Claus, and traveled into outer space. In 2000, he gave his endorsement to Al Gore. It was foretold that Bat Boy would become president in 2028.

The story of Bat Boy was the basis for an acclaimed off-Broadway musical, Bat Boy: The Musical, in which Bat Boy meets a tragic end. In addition to articles, Bat Boy has been featured in a comic strip since 2004, though it is said that only the articles are the "true" story of Bat Boy.

=== Page 5 Honey ===
Each week a different model was featured on page 5 and on the back page. She was usually wearing a bikini and a description of her was printed. This feature ended after the Halloween issue of 2006.

=== "ALIVE!" ===
One of the many other recurring subjects was the occasional "ALIVE!" cover story. Most often the story pertained to some sort of creature such as a mummy, prehistoric creature, or, occasionally, a human who had been frozen in a block of ice (e.g. Santa Claus).

Another subject often tackled by WWN is the reemergence of many prominent figures believed to be deceased, including Hank Williams, Marilyn Monroe, John F. Kennedy, Adolf Hitler, and Michael Jackson. Survivors of the Titanic and Hindenburg were also occasionally featured. Among the most frequently printed reports were those asserting that "Elvis is alive."

The WWN frequently reported Elvis sightings with a series of articles claiming that Elvis Presley had faked his death and had recently emerged from years of seclusion to prepare for a comeback. Obviously altered photos purported to show a gray-haired, balding Elvis sneaking into a movie theater and coming out of a Burger King restaurant. When the U.S. Postal Service conducted a poll to determine the design of the Elvis commemorative postage stamp, the WWN conducted its own poll pitting the USPS's 1950s Elvis and 1970s Elvis versus its own, 1990s Elvis; the elderly Elvis won.

In 1994, the newspaper ran a front cover with the headline "Elvis Presley Dead!", stating that Presley was now "really dead" from heart failure after slipping into a diabetic coma. In a 2004 Washington Post article on Clontz's death, humorist Gene Weingarten claimed that he and Dave Barry were the sources of the story. According to Weingarten, the WWN later reported that claims of Presley's (belated) death had been a hoax. In an earlier telling of his story, Weingarten varied some details.

=== The World's Fattest... ===
Numerous stories regarding shockingly obese people made the pages of WWN, the most popular of which was Roland Gillespie, the world's fattest man. After Roland was first discovered, WWN encouraged readers to send in their guesses as to how much they believed Roland weighed. Weighing in at over 576.2 lbs., Roland was featured being weighed and measured and the crew was possibly sat on, by the world's fattest man. Later stories involved Rolands attempts to lose weight through the OMAD diet, his struggle with near fatal obesity, and claims that he had eaten his family.

Other stories featured the exploits of the world's fattest couple at the gym, the world's fattest baby, and a similar weight-guessing contest featuring the world's fattest dog. One continuing story featured a morbidly obese man Buster Simcus who had lost so much weight that it left 80 pounds of loose skin hanging off his body that he intended to have surgically removed. By the next story, his gaining of weight had severely damaging his scars.

=== Upcoming economic depressions ===
WWN covered stories that featured analysis of a coming Great Depression in the immediate future in which many prominent celebrities, politicians, and icons of business would become penniless. The cover story of the June 6, 2005, issue warned that the second Great Depression was "just weeks away." Because of this, Texas oil tycoons were planning to flee to Luxembourg, the only country to survive this economic crash. Consequences of this depression would include mass starvation, a disease epidemic, mobs of looters and a return to pagan religions and Satanism.

=== Religion and Biblical relics ===
Another typical Weekly World News topic was new Bible-related findings, including relics from Noah's Ark, the Garden of Eden (claimed by the tabloid to be in Colorado), the discovery of additional commandments from God, and sandals worn by Jesus. The magazine also reported on when Jesus will return to Earth, and held an interview with Sisyphus when he finished his eternal boulder-hauling "workout." Other stories stated that natural disasters such as earthquakes and human economic activity like drilling for oil have opened up gates and portals to Hell from which demons have escaped to wreak havoc upon the earth. A story shortly after September 11, 2001 showed the face of Satan appearing in a cloud of dust caused by the collapse of the World Trade Center. Similar stories, wherein Satan's face had appeared in a thunderstorm, had appeared before.

=== Terrorism ===
Following the terrorist attack on September 11, 2001, WWN featured articles about plans for future terrorist attacks on the United States of America. A 2004 cover story described plans by Kim Jong-il to eventually invade and conquer the United States. Other stories featured profiles on the location and nature of Iraq's weapons of mass destruction, including the news that Saddam Hussein had an arsenal of giant slingshots, the missing link, and dinosaurs. In 2003, a series of articles profiled the ongoing relationship between and eventual marriage of Saddam Hussein and Osama bin Laden. Other stories have made claims that Bin Laden was actually a dwarf, that he recruited a cloned Adolf Hitler to join Al Qaeda, and that he was in fact dead, long before his actual death and that the CIA was keeping it a secret. After his being captured by Bat Boy, Saddam was humiliated by female prison guards, won the United States lottery, and even demanded that the government pay for his sex change operation.

=== Presidency ===
WWN has often been the home to political satire regarding current and past presidential administrations. The magazine reported that the founding fathers were all gay and that George Washington and Abraham Lincoln were actually women. According to the paper, President Lincoln was insane, and his ghost had also been spotted in the White House giving President George W. Bush advice on the war in Iraq. Stories about President George W. Bush capitalized on the public's perception that he lacked intelligence. The paper chronicled his plans to run for pope, his love affair with Janet Reno, and his intention to nominate Yoda as secretary of defense. The June 21, 2004, issue stated that Vice President Dick Cheney was actually a robot and that his frequent trips to the hospital allowed him to rewire his circuits.

=== Aliens ===
Aliens are another subject frequently tackled by WWN. Weekly World News blamed these creatures for holes in the ozone. A Roswell crash survivor, "Altair Bob," made contact with WWN via telepathic e-mail. Several factions of extraterrestrials have been using the moon to dump garbage. Martians have been monitoring the Mideast crisis. Warrior aliens have been resurrecting the dead, fighting Bigfoot, and training in a mock U.S. town hidden in Antarctica. San Franciscans have opened their hearts to immigrants from Mercury.

One such alien, named P'Lod, who made several appearances in WWN, has been known to fraternize with known women of politics. It was reported that he and Hillary Clinton once had a close relationship that ended up in a brawl between him and President Bill Clinton, who went on a jealous rage. After P'Lod left Hillary Clinton, he expressed a lot of interest in Condoleezza Rice. A June 15, 1993 cover announced Hillary Clinton's adoption of an alien baby.

In the June 7, 1994, edition, WWN reported that 12 U.S. senators were aliens from other planets. In response, several senators or their spokespersons humorously "confirmed" the story. One, William S. Cohen of Maine, told the mainstream press, "It is preferable to be a space alien than a space cadet."

In the August 11, 1998, edition, WWN reported that autograph dealer Steve Koschal offered to pay $1 million for anything signed by an alien. Koschal said he would pay the million dollars to anyone who had a signed letter or signed photograph or anything signed by a visitor from outer space. "Hundreds of people claim to have been abducted and taken aboard UFOs and yet there's not a single verifiable signature of an extraterrestrial being anywhere on Earth," said Koschal in an exclusive interview. "Someone out there must have asked one of these creatures for an autograph," continued Koschal. "If not, someone will in the future. When they do, I want to be the first collector to acquire it."

The subject of space aliens endorsing U.S. presidential candidates in various elections was also a recurring topic. During the 2000 U.S. presidential election, then-candidate George W. Bush posed for photographers with a Weekly World News issue opened to the article reading, "Space Alien Backs Bush for President!".

=== Cryptids ===
Cryptids and half-animal half-human hybrids are another frequent topic of Weekly World News. Creatures such as Bigfoot, merpeople, real-life catwomen, half-alligator half-humans, frog babies, kangaroo women, and many other creatures have taken the world by storm on various covers (e.g. Abominable Beachman strikes terror in Hawaii! and Bigfoot Steals Race Car!!!!) including the aforementioned 'Bat Boy'.

=== Merfolk ===
The existence of mermen and mermaids is also frequently reported in the pages of the Weekly World News. One detailed article of the Weekly World News recounted a mermaid being caught in a fishing net off the coast of Florida on April 17, 2004. According to the article, she was at least half human, half fish, very sociable, and extremely intelligent; and was able to talk in a sophisticated "three dimensional language" that depends heavily on noises that could possibly be connected to the "click languages" prevalent in parts of Africa and on hand movements that look like sign language.

Similar to their female counterparts, mermen are found within the pages of the Weekly World News. On June 17, 2003, a merman was reported to have been caught in the South Pacific ocean, this one measuring only 28 inches.

== Stories taken as legitimate ==
Since the Weekly World News began to publish online, its stories have occasionally been treated as legitimate news stories by readers unaware of the nature of the publication.

- In late 2010 the WWN ran a satirical story, written by Frank Lake, indicating that the Los Angeles Police Department intended to purchase 10,000 jet packs at a total cost of one billion dollars. The story was reported as fact by the Fox & Friends morning news show.
- The WWN reported twice, once in 2011 and once in 2012, that the social media website Facebook would shut down. Both times, the claim was interpreted by some as genuine. The second time, Facebook issued an official reply to the technology blog Mashable, stating, "The answer is no, so please help us put an end to this silliness. We didn't get the memo about shutting down and there's lots to do, so we'll just keep cranking away like always."

== Demise and relaunch ==
In 1999, David Pecker bought American Media Inc., which owned the Weekly World News. Within the next two years, many of WWN's longtime writers and editors, including Clontz, Sal Ivone, Derek Clontz, Susan Jimison, Joe Berger, Bob Lind, Dick Kulpa, and Leskie Pinson, were gone. Clontz left the paper in 2001, having been there 20 years, and died in 2004.

In a filing with the United States Securities and Exchange Commission in March 2007, American Media said that sales of WWN in 2006 were only 83,000 per issue. WWN ceased its print publication in August 2007. It was then published as an insert within the Sun magazine, with new material being printed alongside articles and columns from older issues, until Sun itself ceased publication in 2012.

In October 2008, Bat Boy L.L.C., a company started by Neil McGinness, bought WWN. It was relaunched as an online-only publication in 2009. In January 2011, the Weekly World News was made available via an online paid subscription. The online edition is emailed to subscribers biweekly. The online edition closely resembles the printed Weekly World News in both appearance (it uses the Weekly World News logo used from 1979 to 2001) and subject matter (the first issue's headline was "Werewolf Sues Airline Over Flight Delay"). In January 2013, Weekly World News announced that it would go behind a paywall. An initial limit was set at three free article views, though select content remained unmetered.

In August 2019, Greg D'Alessandro took over as CEO/Editor-In-Chief with David Collins as President/CFO. They relaunched the brand and began developing a number of projects with Hollywood producers.

On September 21, 2020, Weekly World News launched a Kickstarter campaign in an effort to expand reporting, graphics and video production, as well as to get the tabloid back into print. The campaign was successful in reaching its financial goal.

On March 21, 2021, 'Weekly World News" printed its first full-length print publication in 15 years. "Weekly World News Greatest Covers" was printed as a limited special edition (5,000 copies).

== Bat Boy television series ==
On July 31, 2024, it was reported by the web site Deadline that Netflix was developing a Bat Boy live-action television series.

== In popular culture ==
Articles from Weekly World News were a primary inspiration for David Byrne's 1986 film True Stories as reported by Rolling Stone magazine: "Your big inspiration for the movie was reading headlines in tabloids. Were you mostly reading Weekly World News at the time?" David Byrne: "Yeah, they were all from Weekly World News. They weren't really in the [National] Enquirer."

In January 1996, a satirical comedy series inspired by Weekly World News premiered on the USA Network, and was hosted by longtime journalist Edwin Newman. The series was canceled after one season.

Tabloid Dreams (1996) by Pulitzer-winning author [Robert Olen Butler] is a short-story collection that used headlines from the Weekly World News and other supermarket tabloids as writing prompts. Two examples: “Jealous Husband Returns in the Form of a Parrot” and “Boy Born with Tattoo of Elvis.”

A parody of the Weekly World News called "The World" was featured in the 1997 film Men in Black as "The best damn investigative journalism in the country." A publication that told the truth because it was 'a free country.' It is cited as a source of material and shows the bug case they are working on.

In an episode of the HBO sketch comedy series Tracey Takes On..., Ruby Romaine (Tracey Ullman) reads and confirms a story printed in the February 24, 1998 issue of Weekly World News about Liberace.

In 1999, the Weekly World News was declared the "Official Newspaper of the Windows 2000 Team" at Microsoft, and its Senior Vice President, Brian Valentine, would read excerpts from it at what was called Windows Information Meetings, or WIMs, while attempting to entertain and encourage the developers, testers, program managers, and writers involved.

Weekly World News was also featured in the Supernatural, Season 2 episode "Tall Tales".

Disney Channel's paranormal/supernatural-themed animated show Gravity Falls features a reference to Bat Boy in the show's intro. Shion Takeuchi and Gravity Falls creator Alex Hirsch, executive producers of Inside Job, said they were inspired by pages of the publication.

Rapper Travis Scott parodies the Weekly World News and references the character Bat Boy on his cover for his 2021 single Escape Plan / Mafia, with a similar tabloid named "Weekly World Truths".

== See also ==
- Fake news
- List of satirical magazines
- List of satirical news websites
- List of satirical television news programs
- The Onion
- Sunday Sport
- Sun
- Toronto Special
