= Dick Kulpa =

American cartoonist (1953–2021)

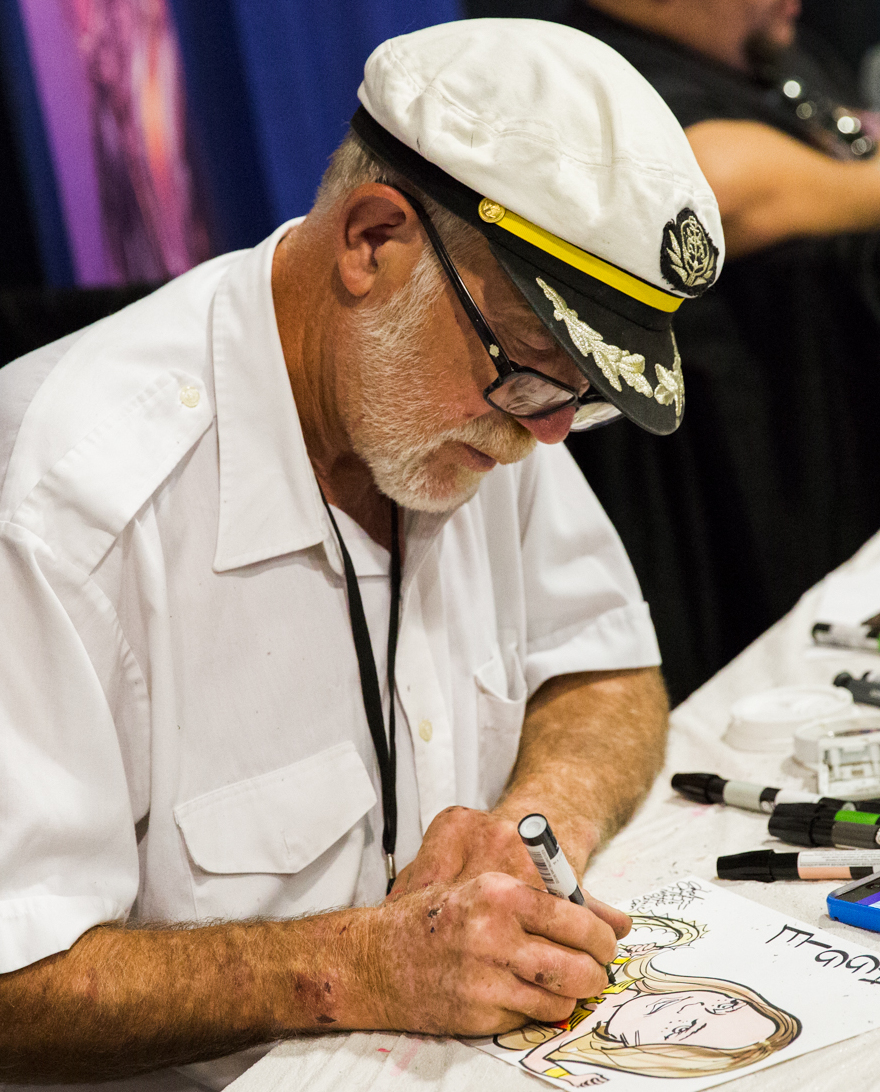
- Kulpa at the Magic City Comic Con in 2016
- Born: Richard Allen Kulpa; January 12, 1953 Loves Park, Illinois, U.S.
- Died: January 3, 2021 (aged 67) Boynton Beach, Florida, U.S.
- Areas: Cartoonist, Editor, Publisher
- Pseudonyms: Alder-Man; County-Man; Captain Cartoon
- Notable works: Double Eagle & Co. Ghost Story Club; Bat Boy; Cracked

Richard Allen Kulpa (January 12, 1953 – January 3, 2021) was an American cartoonist best known for his work for Cracked and Weekly World News.

== Early career ==
Born in Loves Park, Illinois, Kulpa got his start in the cartooning business on Christmas Day in 1969 when his hometown Illinois weekly newspaper, the Loves Park Post, published his first cartoon strip, Double Eagle & Co. The semi-autobiographical cartoon told the story of a young man obsessed with his 1960 Chevy. The Double Eagle strip brought much attention to the young Kulpa, and he continued working as an independent editorial cartoonist and graphic artist. Several of his successful advertising campaigns earned awards.

== Syndication ==
Kulpa's first syndicated work appeared in 1983, when he produced the Star Trek and Bruce Lee newspaper comics for the Los Angeles Times Syndicate. Kulpa met Star Trek creator and producer Gene Roddenberry when he served as alderman and presented Roddenberry with one of his original Star Trek cartoons from the Los Angeles Times Syndicate.

From 1982-88, Kulpa served as graphic arts manager for the Testor Corporation, manufacturer of model kits, where he designed cartoon instruction sheets and collateral materials for their line of Weird-Ohs models.

He illustrated Tribune Media Services' nationally and internationally syndicated Ghost Story Club comic strip and the weekly cartoon panel Draw Play for the Chicago Bear Report newspaper.

== Weekly World News ==
For over ten years, Kulpa served as art director for the nationally distributed supermarket tabloid Weekly World News, and was lampooned as such in the Topps' comic book Jurassic Park. Kulpa co-created the now-famous Bat Boy character which first appeared in Weekly World News on June 23, 1992.

== Cracked Magazine ==
In 2000, Kulpa acquired the national humor magazine Cracked and became its editor and publisher. Kulpa, contractually prohibited from talking about it, says the magazine suffered from sudden changes in financing and unexpected distribution cuts. When the distribution company's account executive openly questioned the difference between Cracked's existing huge 62,000 rack database with its actual low 15,000 rack distribution, he was immediately taken off the title by the distributor. Kulpa sold the magazine in 2005.

== Government service and alter-egos ==
Kulpa was a former alderman of Loves Park, Illinois. In 1977 he was elected to the Loves Park City Council. He would wear red, white and blue leotards and cape and become Alder-Man, crusader for justice, much to the delight of the townspeople. He served in this position until 1984, when he then became County-Man, (in maroon and gold tights) after an upset election to the Winnebago County board. Kulpa the elected official continued to pen issue-oriented editorial cartoons in office, sometimes commenting on other politicians.

Trading in his "superhero" leotards for a more conservative sea captain's look, Kulpa appeared as Captain Cartoon, caricature artist, at venues throughout South Florida.

== Death ==
Kulpa died from cancer on January 3, 2021, nine days shy of his 68th birthday.

== Bibliography ==
=== Writer / artist ===
- Gangbuster (1986) — original anti-gang comic book; recently updated by the artist and currently being circulated by police departments

=== Illustrator ===
- The Redneck Guide to Raisin' Children, written by Annie & Glen-Bob Smith (St. Martin's Press, 1998)
