= Bob Lind =

American singer-songwriter (born 1942)

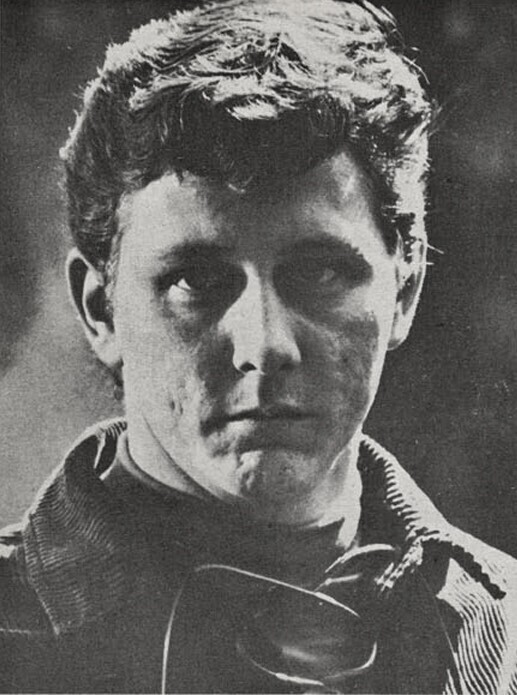
- Lind in early 1966

Background information
- Born: Robert Neale Lind; November 25, 1942 (age 83); Baltimore, Maryland, U.S.
- Genres: Folk
- Occupation: Singer-songwriter
- Instruments: Vocals; guitar
- Years active: 1965–present
- Label: World Pacific
- Website: boblind.com

Robert Neale Lind (born November 25, 1942) is an American playwright, novelist, and singer-songwriter who helped define the 1960s folk rock movement in the U.S. and UK. Lind is notable for his transatlantic hit record "Elusive Butterfly", which reached number 5 on both the US and UK charts in 1966. Many musicians have recorded songs by Lind, who continues to write, record and perform.

== Early life ==
Lind was born in Baltimore, Maryland. His parents divorced when he was five, and his mother remarried; his stepfather was in the Air Force, and the family travelled for some years before settling in Denver, Colorado. He became interested in folk music while a student at Western State College in Gunnison, Colorado, and abandoned his studies to become a musician.

== Career ==
=== Music ===
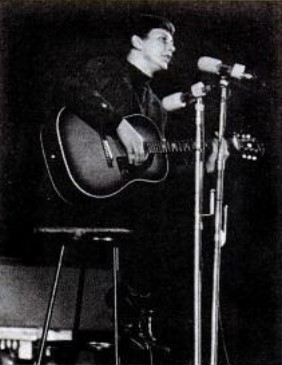
Lind, featured in the May 28, 1966 issue of Billboard

In 1965, Lind signed a recording contract with Liberty Records' subsidiary, World Pacific Records, and on that label he recorded "Elusive Butterfly". The single might have done even better on the UK Singles Chart had competition not arisen from established Irish recording artist Val Doonican, who released a cover version of the song at the same time. In the end, both versions of "Elusive Butterfly" made number five in the UK in 1966. Lind also wrote "Cheryl's Goin' Home", which was covered by Adam Faith, the Blues Project, Sonny & Cher, John Otway, the Cascades, and others.

To date, Lind's compositions have been eventually covered by more than 200 artists. including Cher, Glen Campbell, Aretha Franklin, Dolly Parton, Eric Clapton, Nancy Sinatra, The Four Tops, The Turtles, Richie Havens, Hoyt Axton, The Kingston Trio, Johnny Mathis, The Rokes (with the Italian covers "Ma che colpa abbiamo noi" and "E' la pioggia che va"), and Petula Clark.

Plagued by drug and alcohol problems, Lind gained a reputation in the business for being "hard to work with." In 1969, Lind severed ties with World Pacific. Three years later, Capitol Records released Since There Were Circles, an album that was well received by critics, but not commercially successful. Lind dropped out of the music industry for a number of years. He was a friend of the writer Charles Bukowski, who used him as a prototype for the character Dinky Summers in his 1978 novel Women and other writings. Lind stopped using drugs and alcohol in 1977.

=== Literature ===
In 1988, he moved to Florida. He wrote five novels, an award-winning play, and a screenplay, Refuge, which won the Florida Screenwriters' Competition in 1991.

For eight years, he was a staff writer at the tabloids Weekly World News and Sun. He has been credited as co-creator (with photo artist Dick Kulpa) of the famous "Bat Boy" Weekly World News cover story.

=== Return to Music ===
Lind returned to music in 2004, when at the urging of his friend Arlo Guthrie, he played at the Guthrie Center in Becket, Massachusetts.

In 2006, RPM Records reissued the album Since There Were Circles, and Lind self-released the Live at Luna Star album featuring performances of new material. In 2007, Ace Records (UK) released Elusive Butterfly: The Complete 1966 Jack Nitzsche Sessions.

The British band Pulp have a song named after him: "Bob Lind (The Only Way Is Down)", from their album We Love Life; the song itself follows a similar musical structure to Lind's hit "Elusive Butterfly". A Lind recording, "Cool Summer", was also included on the compilation album The Trip, compiled by Pulp's Jarvis Cocker and Steve Mackey.

In 2009, filmmaker Paul Surratt completed a concert/documentary DVD called Bob Lind: Perspective.

In October 2012, 41 years after the release of his last studio album, Lind issued a CD of new music: Finding You Again, produced by veteran rock guitarist Jamie Hoover of the Spongetones and released by Ace Records.

In November 2013, Lind was inducted into the Colorado Music Hall of Fame, along with Judy Collins, The Serendipity Singers, and Chris Daniels. Lind was inducted into the Maryland Entertainment Hall of Fame on November 17, 2019.

In July 2016, Ace Records released a new album of new songs, entitled Magellan Was Wrong. Jamie Hoover was once again involved in the production; other producers were Frank "Rat" Falestra, jazz master Greg Foat, and Lind himself. All songs are originals, with the exception of a folk-style cover of the Tom Paxton classic "Bottle of Wine". On February 25, 2022, Ace Records released Something Worse Than Loneliness, Lind’s third album of new music over the last 10 years. It received 8/10 in Uncut and four stars in Shindig!.

On February 3, 2024, Lind headlined the South Florida Folk & Acoustic Festival, closing Saturday night's main stage performances.

=== Theatrical Writing ===
In October 2019, his short play A Good Night won a place in the Delray Beach Playwright’s Festival. And in May 2023, another of his one-acts, Spain, enjoyed a successful run in The Curtain Call Playhouse’s Short Play Festival.

On October 13, 2023, Lind received his first European production as a playwright when his trilogy, The Road Plays (three one-act plays presented on a single evening), was presented at the New English American Theatre (NEAT) in Stuttgart, Germany.

In January 2025, NEAT entered Lind's plays "Broken Strings" and "Spain" into FEATS – Festival of European Anglophone Theatrical Societies. After playing on the main stage, "Broken Strings" won The William Valk Award for Best Original Script.

== Discography ==
=== Singles ===
Year	Title	Peak chart positions		Record Label	B-side	Album
Year	Title	US	UK	Record Label	B-side	Album
1965	"Elusive Butterfly"	5	5	World Pacific Records	"Cheryl's Goin' Home"	Don't Be Concerned
1966	"Remember the Rain"	64	46	World Pacific Records	"Truly Julie's Blues (I'll Be There)" (BB number 65)	Photographs of Feeling
1966	"Hey Nellie Nellie"	–	–	Verve Folkways Records	"Wandering"	The Elusive Bob Lind
1966	"I Just Let It Take Me"	123	–	World Pacific Records	"We've Never Spoken"	Photographs of Feeling
1966	"San Francisco Woman"	135	–	World Pacific Records	"Oh Babe Take Me Home"	Photographs of Feeling
1966	"White Snow"	–	–	Verve Folkways Records	"Black Night"	The Elusive Bob Lind
1967	"It's Just My Love"	–	–	World Pacific Records	"Goodtime Special"	
1967	"Goodbye Neon Lies"	–	–	World Pacific Records	"We May Have Touched"	
1971	"She Can Get Along"	–	–	Capitol Records	"Theme from the Music Box"	Since There Were Circles

=== Albums ===
Year	Album	Billboard 200	Record label
1966	Don't Be Concerned	148	World Pacific Records
1966	Photographs of Feeling	–	World Pacific Records
1966	The Elusive Bob Lind	–	Verve Folkways Records
1971	Since There Were Circles	–	Capitol Records
2006	Live at The Luna Star Cafe	–	self-released
2012	Finding You Again	–	Big Beat Records
2016	Magellan Was Wrong	–	Big Beat Records
2022	Something Worse Than Loneliness	–	Ace Records
2026	It Oughta Be Easy	–	Ace Records

=== DVDs ===
- Bob Lind: Perspective – Research Video (2009)
