= Ed Anger =

Opinion column persona

Ed Anger is a pseudonymous opinion columnist in the Weekly World News, a former U.S. tabloid, now a web site. In addition to weekly columns, a collected book of his writings, Let's Pave the Stupid Rainforests & Give School Teachers Stun Guns: And Other Ways to Save America was published in 1996.

== History ==
The identity was created by Weekly World News writer Rafael "Rafe" Klinger in 1979. Anger's columns were written by the paper's editor Eddie Clontz from approximately 1990 until Clontz's departure in 2001. After Clontz's retirement, other members of the paper's staff continued penning columns under Ed Anger's name. In June 2004, Justin Mitchell outed himself as one of the subsequent writers, stating that he was the fourth man to assume the identity in print. Kathy Shaidle penned the column for the online only version of the Weekly World News from 2009 to 2010.

Klinger sued the Weekly World News in 1990, claiming that they had no right to continue publishing columns by Anger after Klinger had departed from the paper. A federal court ultimately ruled against Klinger in 1994, prompting the writer to respond in the style of Anger with the remark, "I'm pig-biting mad."

In 2002, the Weekly World News temporarily closed its website, weeklyworldnews.com, leaving only a message from Anger on the front page. In the missive, Anger threatened that the web content would not reappear until more of the site's readers started buying the printed edition of the tabloid. Kevin Hyson, vice president of the Weekly World News' parent company American Media, subsequently confirmed that the message was a prank designed to broaden the paper's subscriber base. Circulation had declined from 328,000 in 2000 to 275,000 in 2001.

== In popular culture ==
Ed Anger is the main character in the IDW Comics limited series Weekly World News. The story arc is called "The Irredemption of Ed Anger."

The Ed Anger persona has also spawned a series of comedic viral videos.

== Writing style ==
The Economist described Anger's opinions as "so vitriolically right-wing that [they] possibly came from the left":

Anger hated foreigners, yoga, whales, speed limits and pineapple on pizza; he liked flogging, electrocutions and beer.

Despite their extremism, Anger's columns were one of the more mainstream elements of the WWN during Clontz's editorship and found a loyal audience.

Anger often begins his columns "I'm madder than...", followed by such phrases as "a monkey with a rotten banana" or "a one-legged man in an ass-kicking contest". These introductions were later lampooned by John Boy and Billy with their "Mad Max" character, who like Anger, is portrayed as an "angry right-winger", and the opening phrase is remarkably similar to that of another fictional character, radio commentator Earl Pitts.
