= Deven May =

American actor (born 1971)

Deven Shaw May
- Deven May following a performance of Jersey Boys in San Francisco
- Born: April 3, 1971 (age 55); Whittier, California
- Occupations: Stage and film actor; photographer
- Website: devenmay.com

Deven Shaw May (born April 3, 1971, in Whittier, California) is an American Broadway performer, actor and photographer. He is most famous for his portrayal of the half-bat, half-human boy in Laurence O'Keefe's Off-Broadway musical Bat Boy, for which he won a Theatre World Award for "Outstanding New York Debut", as well as Drama Desk and Lucille Lortel Award nominations. He also performed as Bat Boy in London at the Shaftesbury Theatre. Among other credits, he appears in the films Temptation and Fabled.

Along with theatre and film, May is also a professional photographer.

May recently played Tommy DeVito in the National Tour Production of Jersey Boys, the Tony Award-winning musical. He later reprised the role of Tommy DeVito in the Las Vegas company at The Paris Hotel, which was previously playing at The Palazzo. May concluded his run as part of the Las Vegas Jersey Boys company on November 23, 2014, after playing the role for seven years.
