= Kaitlin Hopkins =

American actress

- Born: Kaitlin Persson
- Occupation: Actress
- Known for: Bat Boy: The Musical
- Parents: Gene Persson (father); Shirley Knight (mother)
- Website: kaitlinhopkins.net

Kaitlin Persson Hopkins is an American actress and singer, the daughter of actress Shirley Knight and stage producer/director Gene Persson.

== Biography ==
In 1982, at the age of 18, Hopkins graduated from the Williston Northampton School.

Hopkins attended the musical theater program at Carnegie Mellon University and studied acting at the Royal Academy of Dramatic Arts in London.

Hopkins' first television credit was an appearance on the soap opera One Life to Live, followed by a regular role on Another World. In 1993, she moved to Los Angeles, where she joined The Matrix Theatre Company. She spent weekends singing at The Pink in Santa Monica, and later performed at The Cinegrill, The Gardina, and At My Place. During this period, her television credits included Beverly Hills, 90210, Murder, She Wrote, The Practice, Diagnosis: Murder, Star Trek: Deep Space Nine, Star Trek: Voyager, Spin City, and Dr. Quinn, Medicine Woman.

In 1994, at the age of 30, Hopkins was cast in the rock opera I Was Looking at the Ceiling and Then I Saw the Sky by Peter Sellars. She spent the next year traveling the world with the production, performing in Paris, Hamburg, Helsinki, and Montreal, as well as at the Edinburgh Festival, among other locales.

In 2002, aged 38, Hopkins made her Broadway debut in Noises Off. She has also appeared in the Lincoln Center benefit performance of Anything Goes with Patti LuPone and How the Grinch Stole Christmas.

Hopkins has performed in numerous live radio plays for LA Theater Works, including Proof with Anne Heche and The Heidi Chronicles with Martha Plimpton.

In 2009, Hopkins was named the new Head of Musical Theatre at Texas State University under the Department Chair, Dr. John Fleming. Her husband, Jim Price, is also on the faculty at Texas State, where he is the Head of Playwriting.

== Discography ==
- Make Me Sweat (2004)

== Acting credits ==
=== Theatre ===
- Bare: A Pop Opera
- The Great American Trailer Park Musical
- Bat Boy: The Musical
- Come Back, Little Sheba
- Disney's On the Record
- Present Laughter
- The Philanderer
- She Loves Me

=== Film and television ===
- Confessions of a Shopaholic
- The Nanny Diaries
- How to Kill Your Neighbor's Dog
- Crocodile Dundee in Los Angeles
- Diagnosis Murder: By Reason of Insanity
- Little Boy Blue
- As Good as It Gets
- Rescue Me
- Providence
- Star Trek: Voyager
- Star Trek: Deep Space Nine
- The Division
- Wings
