= San Castle, Florida =

- CDP
- Location within Florida
- Coordinates: 26°33′54″N 80°03′40″W
- Country: United States
- State: Florida
- County: Palm Beach

Area
  - Total: 0.42 sq mi (1.09 km^{2})
  - Land: 0.42 sq mi (1.09 km^{2})
  - Water: 0 sq mi (0.00 km^{2})
- Elevation: 23 ft (7.0 m)

Population (2020)
  - Total: 3,755
  - Density: 8,947.7/sq mi (3,454.71/km^{2})
- Time zone: UTC-5 (Eastern (EST))
  - Summer (DST): UTC-4 (EDT)
- Area codes: 561, 728
- GNIS feature ID: 2628532

San Castle is a census-designated place (CDP) in Palm Beach County, Florida, United States. It is part of the Miami metropolitan area of South Florida. The population was 3,755 as of the 2020 census.

== Geography ==
The town of Lantana to the North. U.S. Route 1, the Hypoluxo Scrub Natural Area, and the Intracoastal Waterway (Lake Worth Lagoon) to the East. The city of Boynton Beach to the South. Interstate I-95 to the West.

=== Topography ===
San Castle is situated on the Atlantic Coastal Ridge, a relict shoreline and dune system associated with the Pamlico and Talbot terraces of the Pleistocene epoch (approximately 125,000 years ago). Formed when sea levels were approximately 30 feet higher than today, this ridge originally existed as a barrier island composed of accumulated sand and coquina (Anastasia Formation).

Due to the high elevation and well-drained sands of this ancient coastline, the area supports remnants of the Florida scrub ecosystem. This is one of the rarest and most endangered ecological communities in Palm Beach County, with less than 2% of the original scrub habitat remaining.

== Climate ==
San Castle lies at the northern edge of the tropics, sharing the same latitude (approx. 26° 33′ N) as Grand Bahama. The community experiences a Tropical monsoon climate (Köppen climate classification Am), characterized by hot, humid summers and warm, drier winters. This climate is heavily moderated by the Gulf Stream, which flows less than a mile offshore and stabilizes annual temperatures.

As a coastal development, San Castle is located a zip code north of the USDA Hardiness Zones 11a, with average annual extreme minimum temperature at 40 °F (4.4 °C). This frost-free environment allows for the cultivation of tropical flora, including coconut palms and the rare Southeast Florida native Pseudophoenix sargentii (Buccaneer palm), as well as various tropical fruit trees that cannot survive further inland.

== Demographics ==
Historical population
Census	Pop.	Note	%±
2010	3,428		—
2020	3,755		9.5%
U.S. Decennial Census

San Castle first appeared as a census designated place in the 2010 U.S. census.

=== 2020 census ===
San Castle racial composition (Hispanics excluded from racial categories) (NH = Non-Hispanic)
Race	Number	Percentage
White (NH)	776	20.67%
Black or African American (NH)	1,456	38.77%
Native American or Alaska Native (NH)	1	0.03%
Asian (NH)	25	0.67%
Pacific Islander or Native Hawaiian (NH)	0	0.00%
Some Other Race (NH)	14	0.37%
Mixed/Multiracial (NH)	107	2.85%
Hispanic or Latino (any race)	1,376	36.64%
Total	3,755	100.00%

As of the 2020 census, San Castle had a population of 3,755. The median age was 35.6 years. 26.3% of residents were under the age of 18 and 14.4% were 65 years of age or older. For every 100 females there were 98.9 males, and for every 100 females age 18 and over there were 99.6 males age 18 and over.

100.0% of residents lived in urban areas, while 0.0% lived in rural areas.

There were 1,179 households in San Castle, of which 37.5% had children under the age of 18 living in them. Of all households, 40.3% were married-couple households, 22.4% were households with a male householder and no spouse or partner present, and 30.0% were households with a female householder and no spouse or partner present. About 25.1% of all households were made up of individuals and 10.7% had someone living alone who was 65 years of age or older.

There were 1,281 housing units, of which 8.0% were vacant. The homeowner vacancy rate was 1.7% and the rental vacancy rate was 4.1%.

=== 2010 census ===
San Castle racial composition (Hispanics excluded from racial categories) (NH = Non-Hispanic)
Race	Number	Percentage
White (NH)	874	25.50%
Black or African American (NH)	1,292	37.69%
Native American or Alaska Native (NH)	17	0.50%
Asian (NH)	21	0.61%
Pacific Islander or Native Hawaiian (NH)	0	0.00%
Some Other Race (NH)	17	0.50%
Mixed/Multiracial (NH)	73	2.13%
Hispanic or Latino (any race)	1,134	33.08%
Total	3,428	

As of the 2010 United States census, there were 3,428 people, 880 households, and 672 families residing in the CDP.

=== Demographic estimates ===
In the 2020 American Community Survey 5-year estimates, there were 797 families residing in the CDP.

In 2015, the median household income of the 1,078 households in San Castle, FL grew to $49,107 from the previous year's value of $42,869.

In 2016, the most common first languages spoken in San Castle are English at 50.4%, Haitian (French) Creole at 31%, Spanish at 18.3%, and Chinese at 0.3%. And as of 2016, US citizens accounted for 77.7% of the population.

== History ==
=== Pre-History ===
Prior to modern settlement, the high ground of the Atlantic Coastal Ridge was part of the greater Jaega tribe territory. The area lies just north of the historic Boynton Mound complex, a significant indigenous site that was largely destroyed in the early 20th century to provide shell fill for construction and development of Ocean Ridge.

=== Postwar development ===
Following World War II, the area was developed to meet the growing demand for housing in South Florida as well as for mango plantations. Platted primarily in the late 1950s, the community was designed as a residential subdivision featuring single-story homes consistent with the Florida Ranch architecture popular during that era.

=== Modern era ===
Over the decades, the community evolved into a distinct census-designated place (CDP) separate from the neighboring municipalities of Lantana and Hypoluxo. Beginning in the 1980s and continuing through the 1990s, San Castle developed a diverse demographic identity, becoming a hub for Caribbean-American culture within Palm Beach County.

=== Crime ===
Despite its small size, the CDP has been notable for being home to the San Castle Soldiers, a set of the greater Top 6 gang; who was featured on the show Gangland, on the History Channel. The gang is notorious for being involved in the Christmas Eve shooting at the Boynton Beach Mall, which resulted in a death. The gang was also involved in several other homicides.
