= South Lake Worth Inlet =

Ocean inlet in Florida, US

The South Lake Worth Inlet, also known as the Boynton Inlet, is an artificial cut through a barrier beach connecting the south end of the Lake Worth Lagoon in Palm Beach County, Florida with the Atlantic Ocean. The inlet is 130 feet (40 m) wide and 6 to 12 feet (1.8 to 3.7 m) deep.

== Geography ==
The South Lake Worth Inlet, at coordinates 26°32′44″N 80°02′34″W, is bordered on the north by the town of Manalapan and on the south by the town of Ocean Ridge. Ocean Inlet Park, owned by Palm Beach County, extends from the ocean to the lagoon on the south side of the inlet, and covers 11.39 acres (4.61 ha).

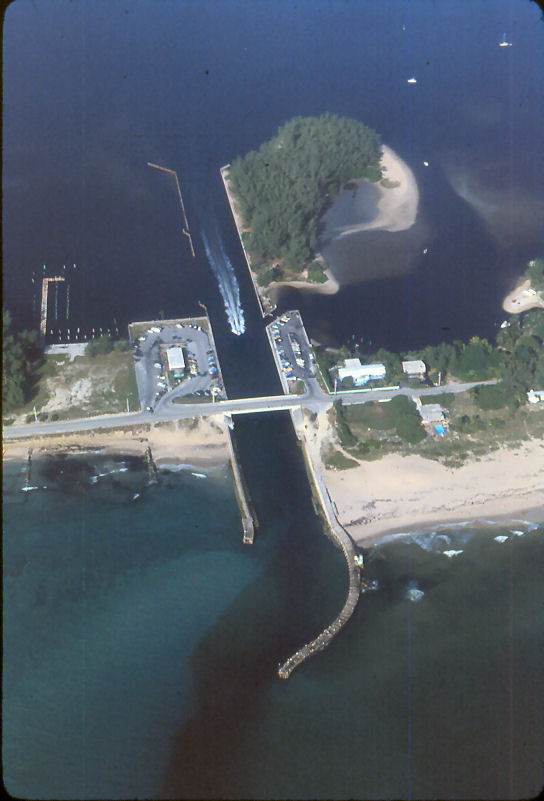
Boynton Inlet About 1982.

== History ==
In the mid-19th century Lake Worth Lagoon was a fresh water lake with no connection to the ocean. After the Lake Worth Inlet was cut near the north end of the lagoon in 1866 (with intermittent closures and re-openings until 1886), the lagoon became increasingly brackish. Development around the lagoon polluted it, as well. By 1913 residents of the area were discussing opening another inlet from the south end of the lagoon to help flush polluted waters into the ocean. The State of Florida created a taxing district for the South Lake Worth Inlet in 1915 (the taxing district was abolished in 1996, and Palm Beach County assumed responsibility for maintaining the inlet). Construction of the inlet began in 1925. The new inlet was completed in 1927 at a cost of $225,000, and was 130 feet (40 m) wide and 8 feet (2.4 m) deep (below mean low water).

As happens generally to inlets on the Florida east coast, the predominantly southward longshore drift caused sand to accumulate against the north jetty of the inlet, and eventually spill over into the inlet and into the Lake Worth Lagoon. The same process also caused erosion of the beach south of the inlet. The height of the inlet jetties was raised, and, in 1937, a sand transfer plant (the first such plant anywhere) was installed on the north jetty to pump sand past the inlet. The transfer plant pumped an average 50,000 cubic yards (38,000 m^{3}) of sand past the inlet in the next five years. The transfer plant was shut down during World War II due to fuel shortages, and sand again accumulated in the inlet and the lagoon. Following World War II, sand transfer was resumed, and dredging of the accumulated shoals in the inlet and the lagoon began. In 1967 the south jetty was extended 65 feet (20 m) and a 410 feet (120 m) curved extension was added to the north jetty. The sand transfer plant was upgraded in 1948, 1967 and 1998, and rebuilt in 2011.

== Navigation ==
State Road A1A crosses the inlet on a fixed-span bridge 18 feet (5.5 m) above the water. The depth of the inlet is between 6 feet (1.8 m) and 12 feet (3.7 m). The inlet was never intended for navigation, but is used by recreational boaters. The inlet has a reputation of being dangerous due to shoaling, strong currents and close clearances. There were more than 46,000 boat trips through the inlet in 2006. Seven boats required rescue in the inlet that year.
