= Zach McCloud =

American football player (born 1998)

Profile
- Position: Linebacker

Personal information
- Born: April 22, 1998 (age 28); Lantana, Florida, U.S.
- Listed height: 6 ft 2 in (1.88 m)
- Listed weight: 235 lb (107 kg)

Career information
- High school: Santaluces Community (Lantana, Florida)
- College: Miami (2016–2021)
- NFL draft: 2022: undrafted

Career history
- Minnesota Vikings (2022)*; Denver Broncos (2022)*; Tennessee Titans (2022–2023)*; Arizona Cardinals (2023)*; Indianapolis Colts (2023)*; San Antonio Brahmas (2024)
- * Offseason or practice squad member only
- Stats at Pro Football Reference

Zachary McCloud (born April 22, 1998) is an American football linebacker. He played college football for the Miami Hurricanes.

== Early life ==
McCloud attended Santaluces Community High School in Lantana, Florida. Coming out of high school, McCloud was rated as a four-star recruit and held 15 offers which included offers from Auburn, Alabama, Florida, Florida State, Georgia, Louisville, North Carolina, and South Carolina. He originally committed in November 2014 to play college football for the Miami Hurricanes, but decommitted after the firing of head coach Al Golden in November 2015. McCloud ultimately decided to recommit to the Hurricanes in December 2015.

== College career ==
As a true freshman, McCloud started in 11 of 13 games at linebacker and finished the season with 37 tackles. In his sophomore season, he played in 13 games and started in 11; he had 48 tackles, two sacks and a forced fumble. He received one Atlantic Coast Conference (ACC) Co-Linebacker of the Week recognition. In his junior season, he played 13 games and started nine. He had 44 tackles in the 2018 season. As a senior, he played only in four games and started one, then redshirted the year. In 2020, as a redshirt senior, he played in nine games and started in eight. He made 27 tackles including two sacks, and was also made co-captain in the 2020 season for Miami. He returned for a final season in 2021, switching to defensive end and using an extra year of eligibility granted by COVID-19 rules. He played 12 games and started nine. He recorded 28 tackles and three forced fumbles.

== Professional career ==
Pre-draft measurables
Height	Weight	Arm length	Hand span	40-yard dash	10-yard split	20-yard split	20-yard shuttle	Three-cone drill	Vertical jump	Broad jump	Bench press
6 ft 2 in (1.88 m)	246 lb (112 kg)	34 3/8 in (0.87 m)	9 1/2 in (0.24 m)	4.68 s	1.62 s	2.72 s	4.47 s	7.33 s	33.5 in (0.85 m)	9 ft 10 in (3.00 m)	17 reps
All values from Pro Day

=== Minnesota Vikings ===
After going undrafted in the 2022 NFL draft, McCloud signed as an undrafted free agent with the Minnesota Vikings. He was waived on August 22, 2022, when the Vikings made some roster cuts.

=== Denver Broncos ===
On November 1, 2022, he was signed to the practice squad of the Denver Broncos.

=== Tennessee Titans ===
On December 23, 2022, he was signed to the practice squad of the Tennessee Titans, where he spend the remainder of the 2022 NFL season. In January 2023, he signed a future contract with the Titans. He was cut on August 16, 2023.

=== Arizona Cardinals ===
On August 22, 2023, he signed with the Arizona Cardinals. He was released when the Cardinals made final roster cuts.

=== Indianapolis Colts ===
On December 19, McCloud was signed to the practice squad of the Indianapolis Colts.

=== San Antonio Brahmas ===
In January 2024, McCloud signed with the San Antonio Brahmas of the United Football League. He was placed on Injured reserve on May 7, 2024. He re-signed with the team on August 26, 2024. He was released on March 20, 2025.
