= South Palm Beach, Florida =

Town in the state of Florida, United States

- Town
- Town of South Palm Beach
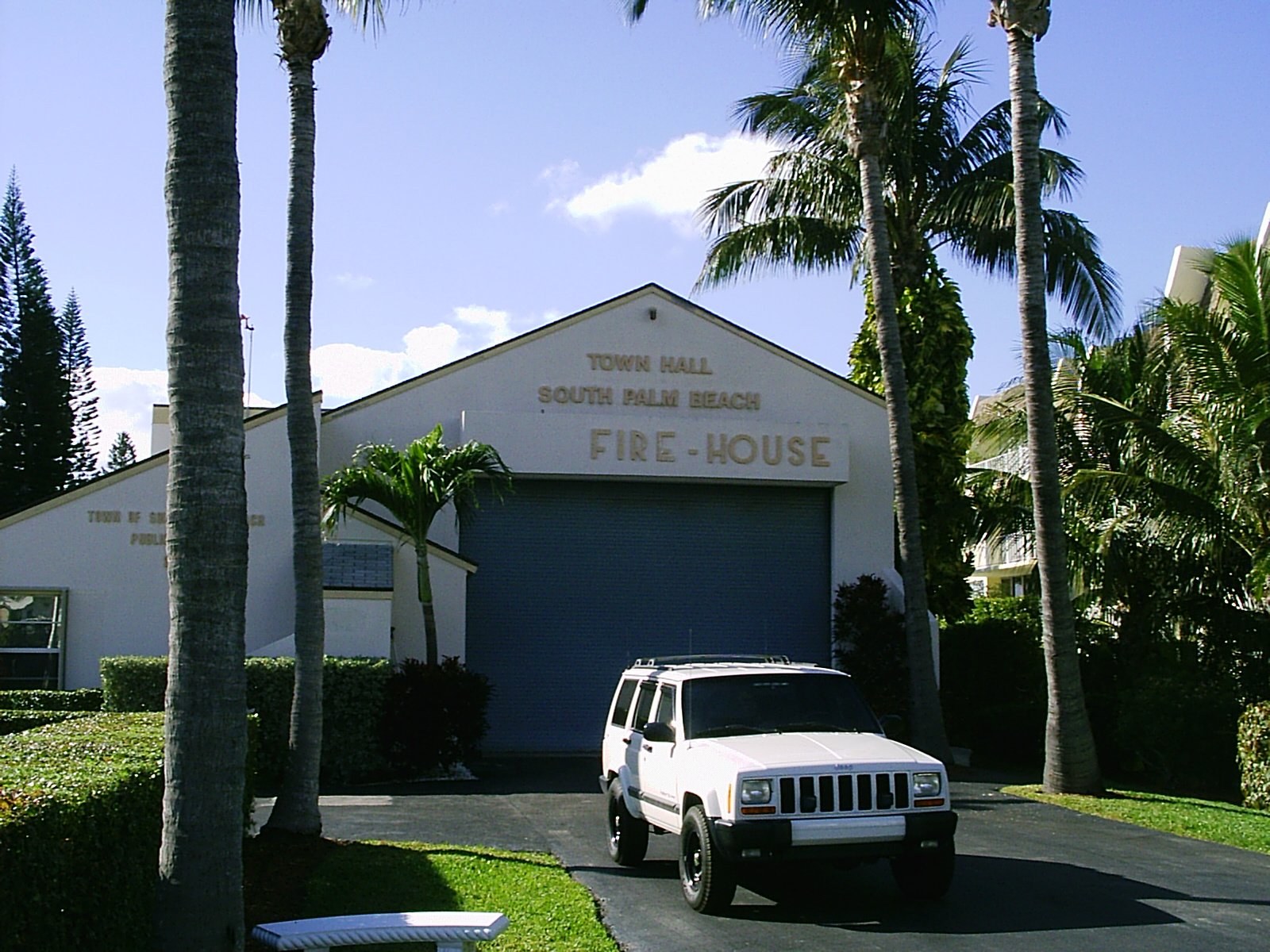
- South Palm Beach Town Hall (which also served as a firehouse and police department building)

- Seal

- Location of South Palm Beach, Florida
- Coordinates: 26°35′23″N 80°02′12″W
- Country: United States
- State: Florida
- County: Palm Beach
- Settled: 1948
- Incorporated: 1955

Government
  - Type: Council-Manager
  - Mayor: Rafael Pineiro
  - Vice Mayor: Francesca Attardi
  - Council Members: Raymond McMillan, Sandra Beckett, and Adrian Burcet
  - Town Manager: James S. "Jamie" Titcomb
  - Town Clerk: Yude Davenport

Area
  - Total: 0.28 sq mi (0.73 km^{2})
  - Land: 0.11 sq mi (0.28 km^{2})
  - Water: 0.17 sq mi (0.45 km^{2})
- Elevation: 3 ft (0.91 m)

Population (2020)
  - Total: 1,471
  - Density: 13,705.8/sq mi (5,291.84/km^{2})
- Time zone: UTC-5 (Eastern (EST))
  - Summer (DST): UTC-4 (EDT)
- ZIP code: 33480
- Area codes: 561, 728
- FIPS code: 12-67650
- GNIS feature ID: 2407372
- Website: www.southpalmbeach.com

South Palm Beach is a town located in Palm Beach County, Florida, United States. The town is part of the Miami metropolitan area of South Florida and is situated on a barrier island between the Atlantic Ocean and the Intracoastal Waterway. The entire town is approximately 5/8 of a mile (1.0 km) long along South Ocean Boulevard (Florida State Road A1A), its only street. It is between the Town of Palm Beach to the north and the Town of Lantana and its public beach to the south. As of the 2020 census, the population was 1,471.

== History ==
The Town of South Palm Beach was first settled by two Finnish brothers from New York in 1948, and was officially incorporated as a municipality in 1955, with several condominiums and four single-family homes platted. Many more condominiums were constructed, contributing to the town's growth in the early 1970s. The fire station served for town meetings until 1993, when a town hall was built.

== Geography ==
South Palm Beach is bordered to the north by the Town of Palm Beach; to the east by the Atlantic Ocean; to the west by the Intracoastal waterway (known locally as the Lake Worth Lagoon); and on the south by the town of Manalapan as well as Lantana's public beach.

According to the United States Census Bureau, the town has a total area of 0.9 square kilometers (0.35 sq mi), of which 0.3 km^{2} (0.12 sq mi) is land and 0.5 km^{2} (0.19 sq mi) (60.61%) is water.

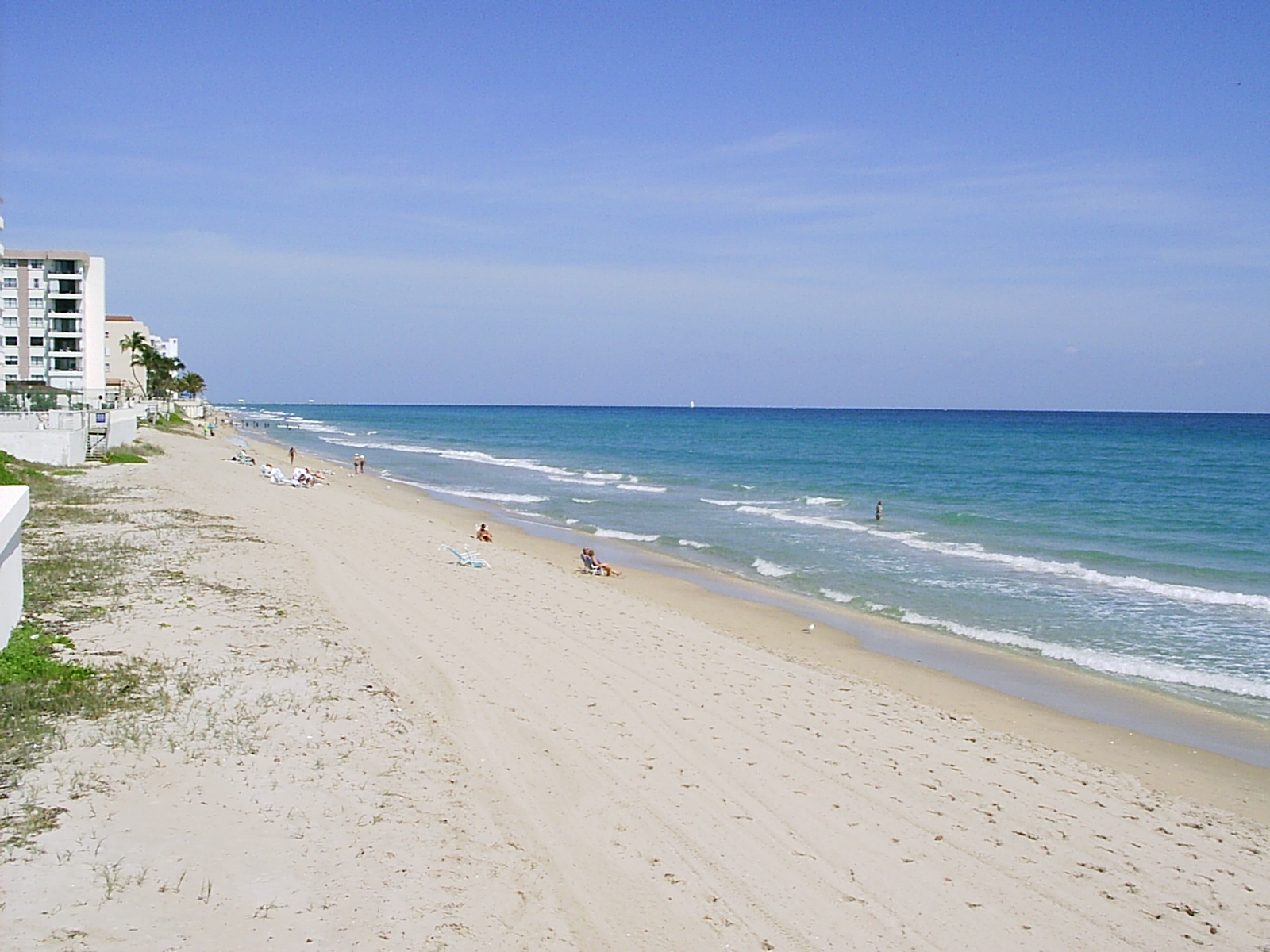
The beach in South Palm Beach before Hurricane Wilma in 2005. (2004)

=== Climate ===
The Town of South Palm Beach has a tropical climate, similar to the conditions found in much of the Caribbean. It is part of the only region in the 48 contiguous states that falls under that category. More specifically, it generally has a tropical savanna climate (Köppen climate classification: Aw), bordering a tropical monsoon climate (Köppen climate classification: Am).

=== Shore stabilization ===
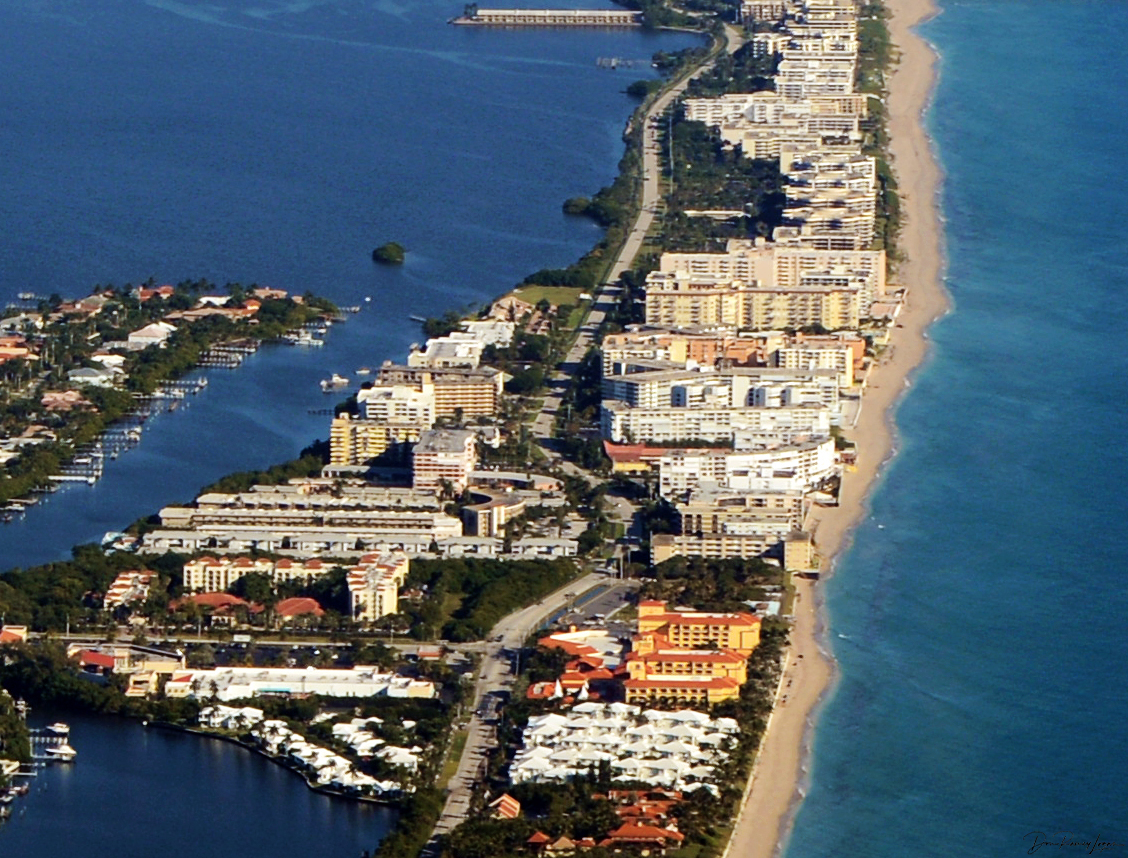
Aerial view of the Town of South Palm Beach. (2014)

Development in the southern part of Palm Beach Island and storm impacts on the coastal system have irreparably transformed the native beach and dune system in areas R-132 to R-138, with an average shoreline recession of 198 feet (60 metres).

From 2003 to 2016, there were six shoreline and dune restoration projects for the town's beach. However, there was nothing to hold the shoreline and dunes in place, and with a nearly wholly armored shoreline, a more long-term solution was needed.

Since 2007, Palm Beach County has completed several engineering studies to evaluate long-term erosion control alternatives, including doing nothing.

The Town of Palm Beach completed its beach nourishment projects in 2016, pronouncing its "coastline is in pretty good shape." No shore stabilization work was performed in South Palm Beach. Plans called for a $5.6 million "Southern Palm Beach Island Comprehensive Shore Stabilization Project" during 2019 and 2020 that was designed to rebuild about 0.67 miles of the town's shoreline. In early 2019, the County determined that the project was "cost prohibitive" and officially withdrew a request for the needed permits from the Florida Department of Environmental Protection.

With assistance from the Town of Palm Beach, a smaller beach nourishment option by trucking sand to feed the eroding town's beachfront may be possible in early 2019. After more than ten years and a devastated shoreline - with several properties only having seawalls remaining against the ocean waves - rather than a beach stabilization project, a restoration of the beach by trucking in sand was conducted in 2021.

A feasibility study and extensive engineering analysis indicated a series of seven low-profile groins with beach dune fill components providing a more stable shoreline with less frequent sand placement. Nevertheless, the trend is at a breaking point for historic coastal development with continuing extensive coastal armoring of existing structures.

== Demographics ==
Historical population
Census	Pop.	Note	%±
1960	113		—
1970	188		66.4%
1980	1,304		593.6%
1990	1,480		13.5%
2000	1,531		3.4%
2010	1,171		−23.5%
2020	1,471		25.6%
U.S. Decennial Census

=== Racial and ethnic composition ===
South Palm Beach racial composition (Hispanics excluded from racial categories) (NH = Non-Hispanic)
Race	Pop 2010	Pop 2020	% 2010	% 2020
White (NH)	1,100	1,270	93.94%	86.34%
Black or African American (NH)	5	15	0.43%	1.02%
Native American or Alaska Native (NH)	0	1	0.00%	0.07%
Asian (NH)	9	26	0.77%	1.77%
Pacific Islander or Native Hawaiian (NH)	0	0	0.00%	0.00%
Some other race (NH)	0	2	0.00%	0.14%
Two or more races/Multiracial (NH)	3	34	0.26%	2.31%
Hispanic or Latino (any race)	54	123	4.61%	8.36%
Total	1,171	1,471		

=== 2020 census ===
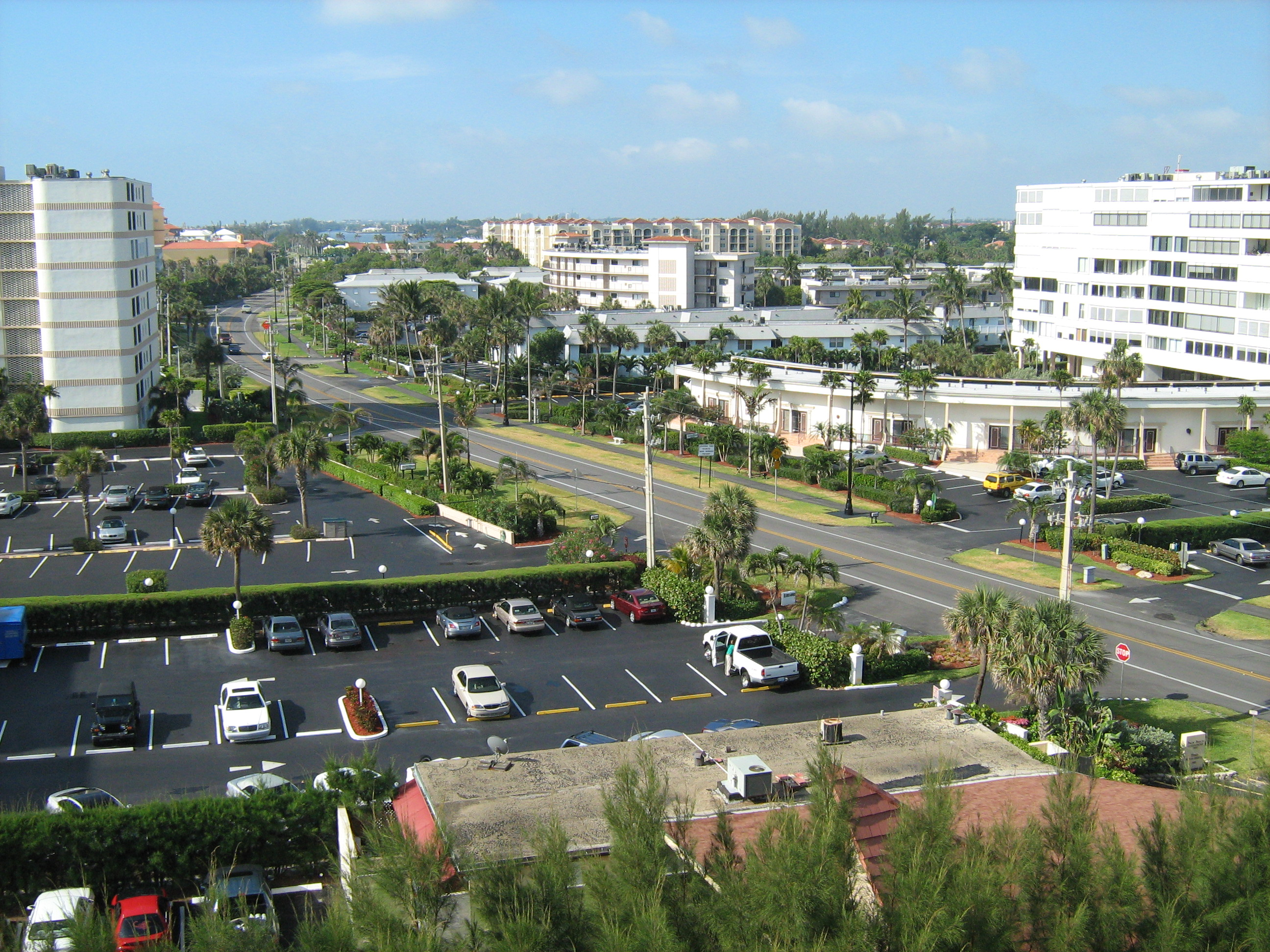
Florida route A1A runs through the center of the town built between the Atlantic Ocean and the Lake Worth Lagoon Intracoastal Waterway. (2008)

As of the 2020 census, South Palm Beach had a population of 1,471. The median age was 67.5 years. 3.5% of residents were under the age of 18 and 55.4% of residents were 65 years of age or older. For every 100 females there were 77.0 males, and for every 100 females age 18 and over there were 76.3 males age 18 and over.

All residents lived in urban areas.

There were 943 households in South Palm Beach, of which 6.4% had children under the age of 18 living in them. Of all households, 35.3% were married-couple households, 19.4% were households with a male householder and no spouse or partner present, and 41.4% were households with a female householder and no spouse or partner present. About 51.9% of all households were made up of individuals and 31.4% had someone living alone who was 65 years of age or older.

There were 1,854 housing units, of which 49.1% were vacant. The homeowner vacancy rate was 4.0% and the rental vacancy rate was 16.5%.

According to the 2020 American Community Survey 5-year estimates, there were 1,028 households and 420 families in the town.

=== 2010 census ===
According to the 2010 American Community Survey 5-year estimates, there were 763 households and 385 families in the town.

=== 2000 census ===
As of the census of 2000, there were 1,531 residents in 453 households and 196 families residing in the town. The population density was 5,204.3 inhabitants per square mile (2,009.4/km^{2}). There were 872 housing units at an average density of 6,492.3 per square mile (2,506.7/km^{2}). The racial makeup of the town was 99.28% White (97% were Non-Hispanic White), 0.14% Native American, and 0.57% Asian. Hispanic or Latino of any race were 2.29% of the population.

In 2000, there were 453 households out of which 2.2% had children under the age of 18 living with them, 38.6% were married couples living together, 3.5% had a female householder with no husband present, and 56.7% were non-families. Households consisting of individuals were 52.1%, and 28.5% had someone living alone who was 65 years of age or older. The average household size was 1.54, and the average family size was 2.14.

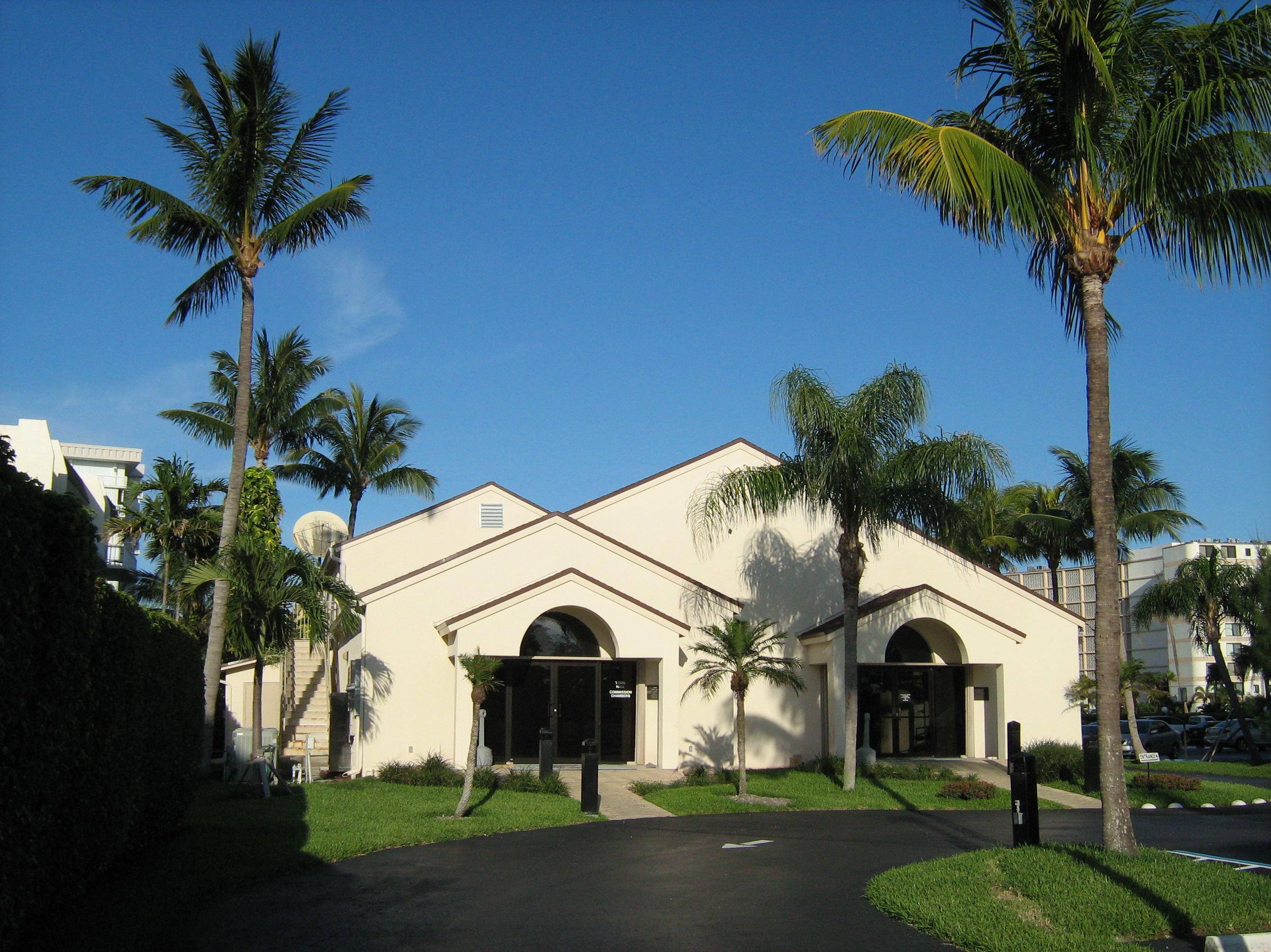
The west side of the South Palm Beach Town Hall. (2008)

In 2000, the population age distribution in the town was spread out, with 2.6% under the age of 18, 1.4% between 18 and 24, 11.3% between 25 and 44, 30.5% between 45 and 64, and 54.2% who were 65 years of age or older. The median age was 67 years. For every 100 females, there were 75.2 males. For every 100 females age 18 and over, there were 76.0 males.

As of 2000, the median household income in the town was US$39,375, and the median family income was $47,250. Males had a median income of $41,591 versus $30,536 for females. The per capita income for the town was $38,456. About 15.3% of families and 15.7% of the population were below the poverty line, including none of those under age 18 and 15.9% of those age 65 or over.

As of 2000, English was the first language spoken by 92.96% of residents, Finnish by 3.90%, and French as a mother tongue made up 3.12% of the population.

== Economy ==
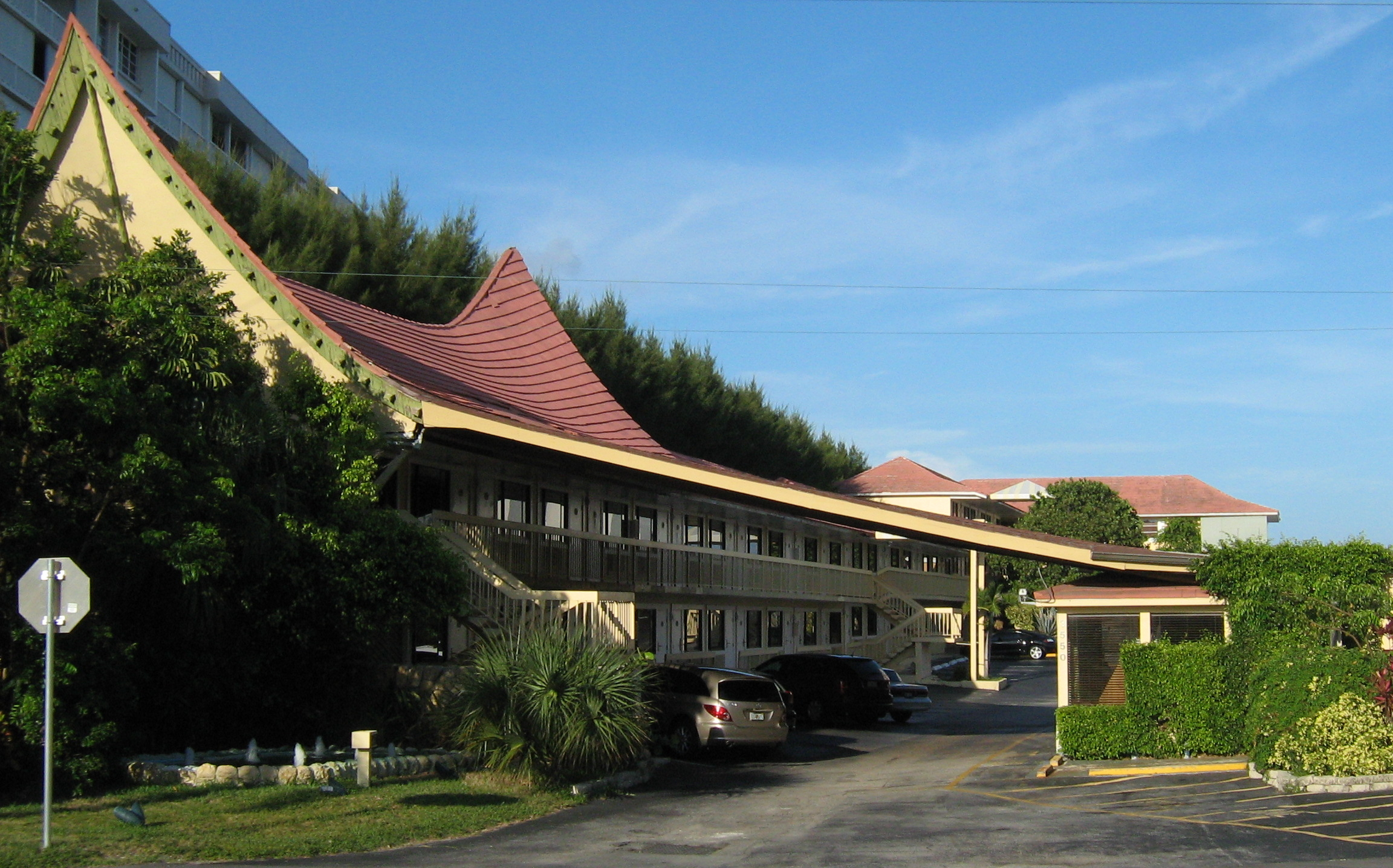
The Palm Beach Oceanfront Inn, which was demolished in April 2016. (2009)

=== Business ===
Initially built in 1964, the Polynesian-inspired, 58-room Palm Beach Oceanfront Inn and its ocean-front restaurant, Tides Bar and Grille, located at 3550 South Ocean Boulevard, made up the only commercial business establishment within the town of South Palm Beach. It was described as "one of the last vestiges of old Florida along A1A."

Kosova Realty bought the inn for $3.3 million in 2002. It was renamed to Palm Beach Oceanfront Inn. Known to locals by its former name, the Hawaiian Inn, the two-story motel lost most of its beach during Hurricane Wilma in 2005 and was not being maintained.

A proposal by the Paloka family-owned-and-operated realty company to replace the inn with a luxury resort-style 12-story condominium-hotel built over two stories of parking was unanimously rejected by the South Palm Beach Town Council in October 2007. The established comprehensive plan limits new buildings to six stories over one level of parking.

At the September 18, 2009, Treasure Coast Regional Planning Council meeting, concerns were expressed about the redevelopment. It was recommended that the Town of Palm Beach respond to citizens' negative opinions before adopting the amendments and ensure that development approval conditions address problems with the use, height limits, and negative impacts on the beaches.

The Paloka family tried to change the town codes to allow a bigger building such as a 14-story condominium and "were willing to build the town a public safety building and new town hall to sweeten the deal." They increased business at the property during 2011 and were planning capital improvements, but foreclosure proceedings began. Kosova Realty filed for Chapter 11 bankruptcy in March 2012.

In November 2012, the operation was purchased by Paragon Acquisition Group of Boca Raton, a distressed property development company, with plans to improve and revive the facility and "possibility of a development project in the future." DDG then partnered with investor Gary Cohen of Paragon on the development. According to the CEO of developer DDG, Joseph A. McMillan Jr., in 2012 a DDG affiliate paid $8.25 million for the 1.1-acre (0.4 ha) site. Although the property has received minor renovations and is being managed as a hotel and restaurant, the long-term prospects for it are for condominiums according to the CEO of Paragon.

The current zoning for ocean-front property in the town allows 33 units per acre, while a more dense project would require a referendum. Plans by DDG were announced for 30 residential units to be built above a one-story parking garage. The old motel and restaurant on the site were demolished in April 2016. Marketing for the new 30-unit building featured amenities such as a concierge service, a dog park, and a private jet service. In June 2018, the building "officially topped out, reaching its full height of seven stories." September 2019 marked the completion of the building.

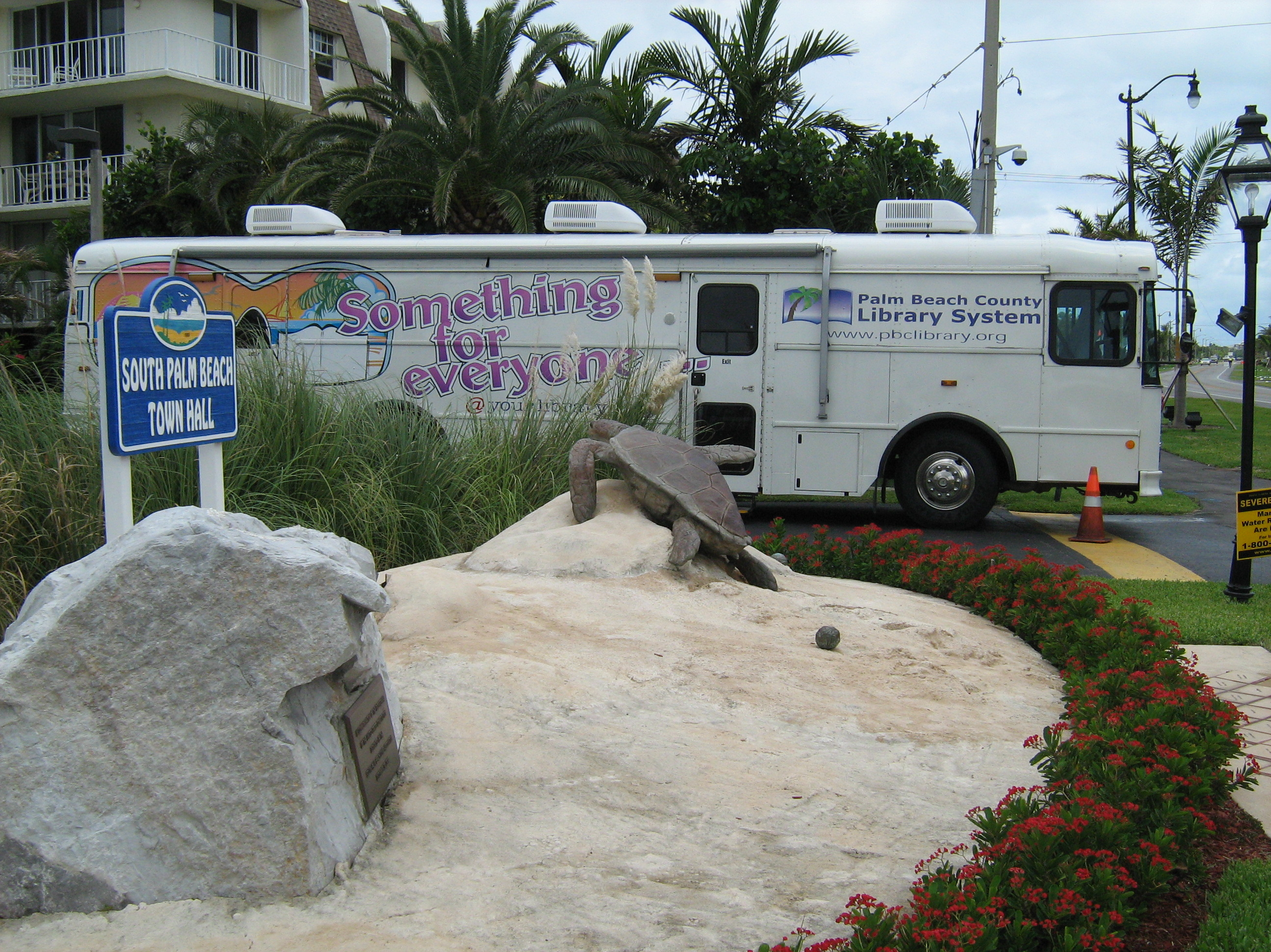
Bronze loggerhead sea turtle in front of the town hall. (2008)

== Town mascot ==
In June 2026, the Town of South Palm Beach council unanimously designated Penny the Sea Turtle as its official municipal mascot to make town communications more engaging. The mascot honors the town's landmark — a life-size bronze loggerhead sea turtle sculpture created for the town's 50th anniversary in 2006 by the late Penny Davidson. A longtime resident, artist, and volunteer, Davidson enriched the community through public mosaic art, art classes, and the town book club before her passing in 2020. By naming the mascot "Penny," the Town Council celebrates both a local monument and Davidson's lasting artistic and civic legacy.
