= James Anthony Frederick =

American serial killer (born 1960)

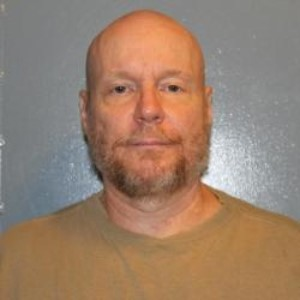
- Born: June 21, 1960 (age 66); United States
- Other names: David Anthony Fenton; Jay Frederick; David Allen Kirchner; James Reichard
- Convictions: Florida: Murder; Wisconsin: Armed robbery; Illegal possession of a firearm by a felon; Reckless injury
- Penalty: Florida: Life imprisonment (2 sentences); Wisconsin: 97 years imprisonment

Details
- Victims: 3
- Span of crimes: 1991–1992
- Country: United States
- State: Florida
- Date apprehended: 1995
- Imprisoned at: Green Bay Correctional Institution, Allouez, Wisconsin

James Anthony Frederick (born June 21, 1960) is an American criminal and serial killer who was linked via DNA to three robbery-murders committed in Lantana, Florida, from 1991 to 1992. He pleaded guilty to the crimes and was sentenced to life imprisonment, but is currently serving an unrelated sentence for armed robbery in Wisconsin.

== Murders ==
=== Martin Gatto ===
On December 9, 1991, the body of 40-year-old Martin J. Gatto, a New York-born filing clerk, was found at his apartment in Lantana. He had been stabbed several times with a knife, but when questioned, neighbors claimed that they had not heard any strange noises the previous night. The murder shocked his co-workers, as Gatto was known as a diligent employee who got along with everybody.

=== Rita and Lisa Bado ===
On August 22, 1992, the bodies of 45-year-old Rita Ann Bado and her 20-year-old daughter Lisa Ann, who had originally moved to Lantana from Torrington, Connecticut, were found inside an apartment in the Runaway Bay apartment complex. The discovery was made by Rita's brother and his wife, who had gone to check on them after learning that Bado had failed to show up at her job as a cashier at a Walmart in Delray Beach. Both women were found bound in the master bedroom; were partially nude; showed signs of sexual assault and were apparently shot to death with a small-caliber weapon.

Upon investigating the crime scene, detectives determined that most of the valuables had been left behind and that there were no apparent signs of forced entry. The only notable thing that was missing was Lisa's black Honda CR-X, but the vehicle was located a few days later outside of a warehouse in Hypoluxo. Due to this, it was suggested that the killings were committed by somebody who was acquainted with the pair, but not necessarily known to them, with one of the investigators on this case mostly dismissing the suggestion that it was the work of a serial killer or somebody who was "passing by." To both the investigators and to Bados' friends' dismay, however, news of the double murder was quickly overshadowed by the after-effects of Hurricane Andrew, which caused great damage across the state. The investigation was hampered as a result, and even with the case being featured on an episode of A Current Affair the following year, it failed to generate any leads and quickly went cold.

== Identification and trial ==
Over the years, the authorities investigated numerous suspects in the Bado murders, until they eventually came across Frederick in 2001. A transient criminal with a rap sheet containing convictions for arson, resisting arrest and selling narcotics, he was known to live in Palm Beach at the time of the murders and was reportedly seen at the apartment on the day of the murders. Now considered a prime suspect, officers traveled to the state of Wisconsin, where Frederick was serving a life term for armed robbery, to question him about the murders, but he did not provide them with anything useful.

Eventually, authorities decided to use the advance of DNA technology for the case, uploading a sample of the supposed perpetrator's DNA found on four cigarette butts and a hair located at the Bado crime scene to CODIS. In May 2003, it was successfully matched to Frederick, who was subsequently charged with two counts of murder, burglary, kidnapping, sexual battery and grand theft. Whilst he steadfastly maintained his innocence, Frederick was nonetheless convicted and given two life terms for the Bado murders.

In October 2006, Frederick's DNA came as a match to the Gatto murder, with which he was also charged and extradited back to Florida. Although he was a known acquaintance of Gatto, Frederick denied ever knowing him or ever visiting the apartment. In the end, he was never put on trial for the murder as he was already serving for life, and of September 2022, Frederick remains behind bars.

== In the media ==
The Bado case was covered on an episode of the Oxygen documentary series Florida Man Murders on the episode "Hurricane Homicides".

== See also ==
- List of serial killers in the United States
