= Barefoot mailman =

19th-century postal delivery route in Florida

The barefoot mailman is an iconic Florida symbol. It refers to the carriers on the first U.S. Mail route (1885–1892) between Palm Beach and the settlements around Lake Worth on the north, and Miami, Coconut Grove, and Lemon City to the south. The mailmen had to walk and travel by boat because there was no road connecting the 68-mile (109 km) route from Palm Beach to Miami. Approximately 28 miles (45 km) of the one way trip was by rowing different boats, and the rest by walking along the firmer sand along the beach. The route was a Star Route, with the carriers contracting with the Post Office. The route was originally called the "barefoot route" and the carriers were called "beach walkists" or "beach walkers". It was not until around 1940 that the term "barefoot mailman" came into use.

== Barefoot route ==
In the early 1880s the communities around Lake Worth were at the end of the mail routes. The mail was carried by a series of Star routes from Titusville to Palm Beach. There was no mail delivery south of Palm Beach. To the south, Miami and the communities around Biscayne Bay received mail by a weekly schooner from Key West.

A Star route to carry mail between Lake Worth and Biscayne Bay was established in 1885. The route involved a round trip of 136 miles (219 km) from Palm Beach to Miami and back, and took six days. The carrier would leave Palm Beach on Monday morning, traveling by boat to the southern end of the Lake Worth Lagoon. He would then cross over to the beach and walk down to the Orange Grove House of Refuge in what is now Delray Beach, where he would spend the night. The next day (Tuesday) he would continue walking down the beach to the Fort Lauderdale House of Refuge, where he would spend that night. On Wednesday the carrier traveled by boat down the New River to its inlet, and then would walk down the beach to Baker's Haulover at the north end of Biscayne Bay. Finally, he would travel down Biscayne Bay by boat to Miami. On Thursday he would start the return trip, arriving in Palm Beach on Saturday. By an alternate account, the route to Miami originally started from Jupiter, but was shortened in 1887, when a new Star route was established from Jupiter to Hypoluxo (south of Palm Beach), with the shortened route running from Hypoluxo to Miami for the rest of its existence.

This route was called the "barefoot route" because the carriers walked barefoot on the beach. The mail carriers, and others who had learned the method of walking long distances on a sloping beach without tiring, were called "beach walkists" or "beach walkers". The barefoot route continued until 1892 when a rock road was completed from Lantana to Lemon City, and the mail contract from the Lake Worth area was taken over by Guy Metcalf. The first known use of "barefoot mailman" was in 1939, when Charles William Pierce, who had been one of the carriers on the barefoot route, used the term in correspondence with Stevan Dohanos, who was painting murals of James Edward Hamilton, another carrier, for the West Palm Beach post office. The term first appeared in print in The Palm Beach Post in 1940.

Another source states that (in 1869) the mail is carried along the coast from St. Augustine to Jupiter Inlet in boats, from there to Miami by foot, and then to Key West by schooner.

== Barefoot mailmen ==
The first barefoot mailman was Edwin Ruthven Bradley, a retired Chicago newsman and Lake Worth resident, who won the postal contract in 1885 with a bid of $600 per year, equivalent to $21,500 in 2025. He and his son, Louie, took turns carrying the mail once a week for about two years. His second son, Guy Bradley, would later become famous after his murder while serving as an early game warden protecting the egrets being poached for tail feathers.

The third, and most famous, of the barefoot mailmen was James E. "Ed" Hamilton, who had come to Hypoluxo from Cadiz, Kentucky (Trigg County) in 1885. Hamilton became the barefoot route contractor when E. R. Bradley quit in 1887. Hamilton disappeared while walking the barefoot route soon after October 10, 1887. Hamilton was not feeling well when he passed through Hypoluxo on October 10. When Hamilton had not returned to Lake Worth at the end of the week, a search was started. Hamilton's possessions, including all of his clothes, were found on the north bank of the Hillsboro Inlet. He had never arrived at the Fort Lauderdale House of Refuge, south of the inlet. The boat that Hamilton used to cross the inlet was missing. He was presumed to have drowned or been taken by a shark or alligator while trying to swim across the inlet to retrieve his boat from the far side. His body was never recovered. A "stranger from the north", identified by House of Refuge keeper Charles Coman, was suspected of having taken Hamilton's boat across the inlet and leaving it on the south side. The stranger was later charged with tampering with government property (Hamilton's row boat). Tried in Federal Court in Jacksonville, the "stranger" was acquitted and therefore his name was never entered in the court records.

After Hamilton's disappearance, Andrew Garnett, who had previously been the postmaster at Hypoluxo, successfully bid for the barefoot route contract. Charles William Pierce substituted for Garnett when he could not travel the route. Other men who have been reported as carriers on the barefoot route included George Charter, Bob Douthit, Dan Kelly, Dan McCarley, Frederick Matthaus, Otto Matthaus, Edward "Ned" Peat, George Sears and a man known only as Stafford. Henry John Burkhardt was the last barefoot mailman.

== Commemorations ==
=== Town of Hypoluxo ===
The welcome signs (three in succession) of the Town of Hypoluxo, incorporated in 1955, said "Welcome to Hypoluxo – home of the Barefoot Mailman".

=== Historical marker ===
A Florida state history marker, located at Boca Raton on the grounds of the Spanish River State Park, honors barefoot mailmen.

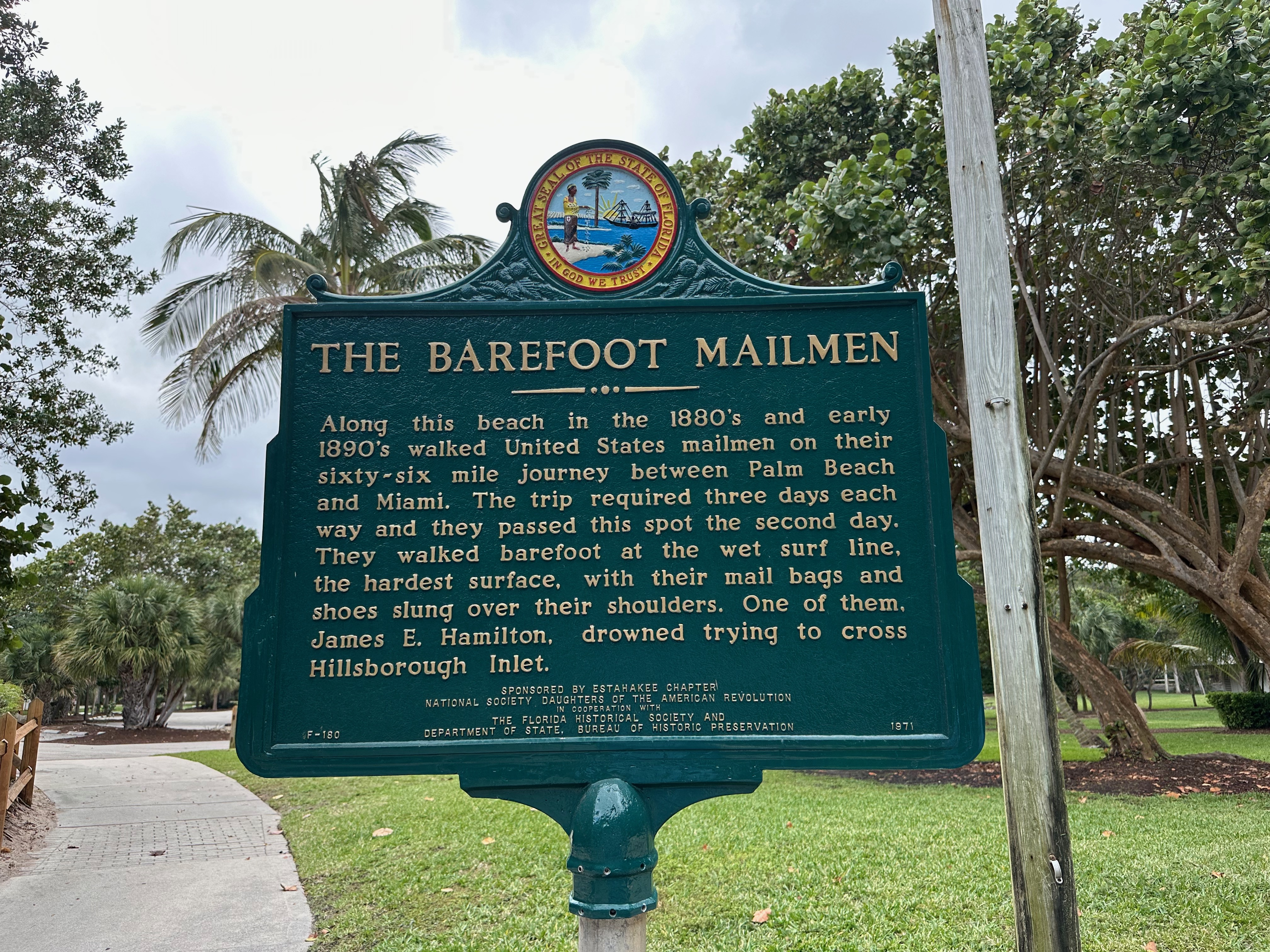
Historical marker in Spanish River Park

=== Statue ===
The original stone statue of the Barefoot Mailman by Frank Varga was permanently displayed on the shores of the Hillsboro inlet next to the Hillsboro Inlet Light with the following inscription:

In Memory of
James E. Hamilton
United States Mail Carrier
Who Lost His Life Here
in Line of Duty
October 11, 1887

On March 19, 2012, during a Hillsboro Lighthouse Preservation Society tour, society president Art Makenian and artist Frank Varga unveiled a bronze 8-foot (2.4 m) tall statue on a 5-foot (1.5 m) tall black galaxy granite pedestal that replaced the 40-year-old Athena stone version, which had incurred significant damage due to age, weather and vandalism.

=== Post office mural ===
In 1939 the Treasury Department's Section of Fine Arts contracted with Stevan Dohanos to paint six murals depicting the "Legend of James Edward Hamilton, Mail Carrier" in the West Palm Beach, Florida Post Office. Charles W. Pierce, who had been one of the carriers on the "barefoot route", was Postmaster in Boynton Beach, Florida at the time, and corresponded with Dohanos, providing photos of James Hamilton in the clothes he wore on the "barefoot route". Dohanos later recalled that Pierce first used the term "barefoot mailman" in their conversations, and that the term thereafter was applied to the murals. Some of the studies for the murals are now in the Smithsonian American Art Museum.

=== Novel and film ===
In 1943 the Theodore Pratt novel The Barefoot Mailman, based on the story of James Hamilton, was published by Duell, Sloan and Pearce, New York. In 1951 the book was made into a movie starring Robert Cummings, Terry Moore, Jerome Courtland and John Russell.

=== Scout Hike ===
The South Florida Council of the Boy Scouts of America sponsors an annual 35-mile (56 km), 2-day hike along portions of the trails used by the Barefoot Mailmen. The Scouts carry actual U.S. Mail and are to be totally self-sufficient (except for water) for the entire duration of the hike from Pompano Beach to Miami Beach.
