= Ocean Ridge, Florida =

Town in the state of Florida, United States

- Town
- Town of Ocean Ridge
- Seal

- Location of Ocean Ridge, Florida
- Coordinates: 26°31′41″N 80°02′51″W
- Country: United States
- State: Florida
- County: Palm Beach
- Settled (Boynton Settlement): c. 1877-1897
- Incorporated (Town of Boynton Beach): 1931
- Incorporated (Town of Ocean Ridge): 1939

Government
  - Type: Council-Manager
  - Mayor: Geoffrey "Geoff" A. Pugh
  - Vice Mayor: Steve Coz
  - Commissioners: Carolyn Cassidy, David Hutchins, and Ainar Aijala Jr.
  - Town Manager: Michelle L. Heiser
  - Town Clerk: Kelly I. Avery

Area
  - Total: 1.75 sq mi (4.54 km^{2})
  - Land: 0.76 sq mi (1.97 km^{2})
  - Water: 0.99 sq mi (2.57 km^{2})
- Elevation: 16 ft (4.9 m)

Population (2020)
  - Total: 1,830
  - Density: 2,405.5/sq mi (928.76/km^{2})
- Time zone: UTC-5 (Eastern (EST))
  - Summer (DST): UTC-4 (EDT)
- ZIP code: 33435
- Area codes: 561, 728
- FIPS code: 12-50950
- GNIS feature ID: 2407033
- Website: www.oceanridge.gov

Ocean Ridge is a town in Palm Beach County, Florida, United States. The town is part of the Miami metropolitan area of South Florida. The population was 1,830 at the 2020 US census.

== Geography ==
Ocean Ridge is a small coastal community along Florida State Road A1A. It lies 1.6 miles north of Briny Breezes, 1.3 miles east of Boynton Beach and 4.3 miles south of South Palm Beach. To the east lies the Atlantic Ocean.

According to the United States Census Bureau, the town has a total area of 2.0 square miles (5.2 km^{2}), of which 0.9 square miles (2.3 km^{2}) is land and 1.1 square miles (2.8 km^{2}) (57.00%) is water.

=== Climate ===
The Town of Ocean Ridge has a tropical climate, similar to the climate found in much of the Caribbean. It is part of the only region in the 48 contiguous states that falls under that category. More specifically, it generally has a tropical savanna climate (Köppen climate classification: Aw), bordering a tropical monsoon climate (Köppen climate classification: Am).

== History ==
=== Pre-Columbian era ===
Prior to the arrival of Europeans, the barrier island now known as Ocean Ridge was inhabited by the Jaega people. Archaeological evidence indicates that the area near the current Boynton Inlet supported significant shell mounds and middens constructed by indigenous inhabitants. These high points on the coastal ridge served as ceremonial sites and lookouts over the Atlantic Ocean and the Lake Worth Lagoon.

=== Destruction of the mounds ===
During the Florida land boom of the early 20th century, these coastal mounds were largely destroyed. The shell and sand material from the ancient mounds was excavated and leveled to grade the land for development in Ocean Ridge.

The Town of Ocean Ridge was founded in 1931 as the Town of Boynton Beach, which was originally part of the Town of Boynton. Major Nathan S. Boynton toured the area in 1894, and established the Boynton Beach Hotel in 1897. The Town of Boynton was incorporated in 1920. In 1925, Addison Mizner drew plans for a 2,000 room hotel in Boynton. The hotel, said to cost between $8,000,000 and $10,000,000 was touted as "one of the largest and most magnificent hotel in South Florida." Some local disagreements, and the 1926 and 1928 hurricanes, along with the bust following the boom squashed the dream. Mizner's property, "Mizner Mile" was sold to Colonel Robert R. McCormick, publisher of the Chicago Tribune in 1930, who turned the property into his private estate. It was the largest transaction in Palm Beach County real estate history.

In 1931, due to disputes over beach area property taxes and the Town of Boynton's rising debt load, twelve homes created the "Town of Boynton Beach". But in 1937, the Town Commission called a special emergency meeting over changing Boynton Beach's name, because mail was being accidentally sent to Daytona Beach due to the similarities in name. Marion White Bird, the daughter of then Mayor Michael White, suggested the name "Ocean Ridge" and won a contest for choosing a new name. The name was officially changed to "Ocean Ridge" in 1939. Two years later, the Town of Boynton itself changed its name, to "Boynton Beach".

== Demographics ==
Historical population
Census	Pop.	Note	%±
1940	37		—
1950	67		81.1%
1960	209		211.9%
1970	1,074		413.9%
1980	1,355		26.2%
1990	1,570		15.9%
2000	1,636		4.2%
2010	1,786		9.2%
2020	1,830		2.5%
U.S. Decennial Census

=== Racial and ethnic composition ===
Ocean Ridge racial composition (Hispanics excluded from racial categories) (NH = Non-Hispanic)
Race	Pop 2010	Pop 2020	% 2010	% 2020
White (NH)	1,671	1,669	93.56%	91.20%
Black or African American (NH)	3	5	0.17%	0.27%
Native American or Alaska Native (NH)	0	0	0.00%	0.00%
Asian (NH)	15	30	0.84%	1.64%
Pacific Islander or Native Hawaiian (NH)	0	2	0.00%	0.11%
Some other race (NH)	7	5	0.39%	0.27%
Two or more races/Multiracial (NH)	13	41	0.73%	2.24%
Hispanic or Latino (any race)	77	78	4.31%	4.26%
Total	1,786	1,830		

=== 2020 census ===
As of the 2020 census, Ocean Ridge had a population of 1,830. The median age was 63.4 years. 8.8% of residents were under the age of 18 and 45.7% of residents were 65 years of age or older. For every 100 females there were 97.8 males, and for every 100 females age 18 and over there were 97.0 males age 18 and over.

100.0% of residents lived in urban areas, while 0.0% lived in rural areas.

There were 972 households in Ocean Ridge, of which 11.0% had children under the age of 18 living in them. Of all households, 50.0% were married-couple households, 19.9% were households with a male householder and no spouse or partner present, and 25.5% were households with a female householder and no spouse or partner present. About 38.1% of all households were made up of individuals and 23.2% had someone living alone who was 65 years of age or older.

There were 1,557 housing units, of which 37.6% were vacant. The homeowner vacancy rate was 4.1% and the rental vacancy rate was 16.4%.

The 2020 American Community Survey 5-year estimates reported 456 families residing in the town.

=== 2010 census ===
The 2010 American Community Survey 5-year estimates reported 960 households and 450 families residing in the town.

=== 2000 census ===
As of the census of 2000, there were 1,636 people, 875 households, and 494 families residing in the town. The population density was 1,909.6 inhabitants per square mile (737.3/km^{2}). There were 1,449 housing units at an average density of 1,691.3 per square mile (653.0/km^{2}). The racial makeup of the town was 98.35% White (95.7% were Non-Hispanic White), 0.12% African American, 0.55% Asian, 0.12% Pacific Islander, 0.43% from other races, and 0.43% from two or more races. Hispanic or Latino of any race were 2.93% of the population.

In 2000, there were 875 households, out of which 11.4% had children under the age of 18 living with them, 52.1% were married couples living together, 3.5% had a female householder with no husband present, and 43.5% were non-families. 37.5% of all households were made up of individuals, and 17.6% had someone living alone who was 65 years of age or older. The average household size was 1.87 and the average family size was 2.41.

In 2000, in the town, the population was spread out, with 10.3% under the age of 18, 1.8% from 18 to 24, 18.5% from 25 to 44, 33.6% from 45 to 64, and 35.8% who were 65 years of age or older. The median age was 57 years. For every 100 females, there were 94.8 males. For every 100 females age 18 and over, there were 90.9 males.

In 2000, the median income for a household in the town was $70,625, and the median income for a family was $99,184. Males had a median income of $91,198 versus $31,607 for females. The per capita income for the town was $76,088. About 2.6% of families and 4.7% of the population were below the poverty line, including none of those under age 18 and 5.4% of those age 65 or over.

As of 2000, speakers of English as a first language accounted for 91.09% of all residents, while French consisted of 3.45%, Spanish was at 3.10%, German at 1.38%, Persian was at 1.50%, and Italian made up 0.96% of the population.

As of 2000, Ocean Ridge had the nineteenth highest percentage of Canadian residents in the US, with 1.70% of the population (tied with twenty-nine other US areas, including Palm Beach Shores).
