= Santaluces Community High School =

Location
- 6880 Lawrence Rd; Lantana, Florida 33462; United States; 26°34′22″N 80°06′15″W

Information
- Type: Public secondary
- Established: 1982
- School district: Palm Beach County School District
- Principal: Tameka Robinson
- Teaching staff: 129.00 (on an FTE basis)
- Grades: 9–12
- Enrollment: 2,568 (2023-2024)
- Student to teacher ratio: 19.91
- Campus: Large Urban
- Colors: Black, red and white
- Mascot: Chief
- Nickname: Chiefs
- Address: 6880 Lawrence Road; Lantana, Florida 33462
- Website: Santaluces website

Santaluces Community High School is a school located in Lantana, Florida, United States. It was opened in 1982 and is managed by the Palm Beach County School District, Florida.

== Notable alumni ==
- Joe Pags (Pagliarulo), 1982, Radio Talk Show Host for the Joe Pags Show, iHeartRadio, Newsmax TV
- Carlos Jenkins, 1986, Linebacker for the Minnesota Vikings, St. Louis Rams
- Oscar Isaac, 1998, Actor/Musician
- C. J. Jones, 1999, Wide receiver for the Denver Broncos
- Vince Wilfork, 2000, Defensive tackle for the New England Patriots, Houston Texans
- Zach McCloud, 2016, Linebacker for the San Antonio Brahmas
