= Hypoluxo Scrub Natural Area =

Coordinates: 26.566°N 80.056°W

Hypoluxo Scrub Natural Area is a 97-acre (39 ha) area of protected Florida scrub, specifically flatwood scrubland in Hypoluxo, Florida. It is located on Hypoluxo Road and US Route 1. The area includes hiking trails and a nature trail. The park includes a multi-level observation tower that provides an overlook of the park as well as a 14-foot Barefoot Mailman statue. The name Hypoluxo comes from the Seminole name for what is now known as Lake Worth, roughly translated as "water all 'round—no get out". The lake was later renamed in honor of Seminole Indian War colonel William Jenkins Worth.
