= Amaryllis (ship) =

Canadian cargo ship

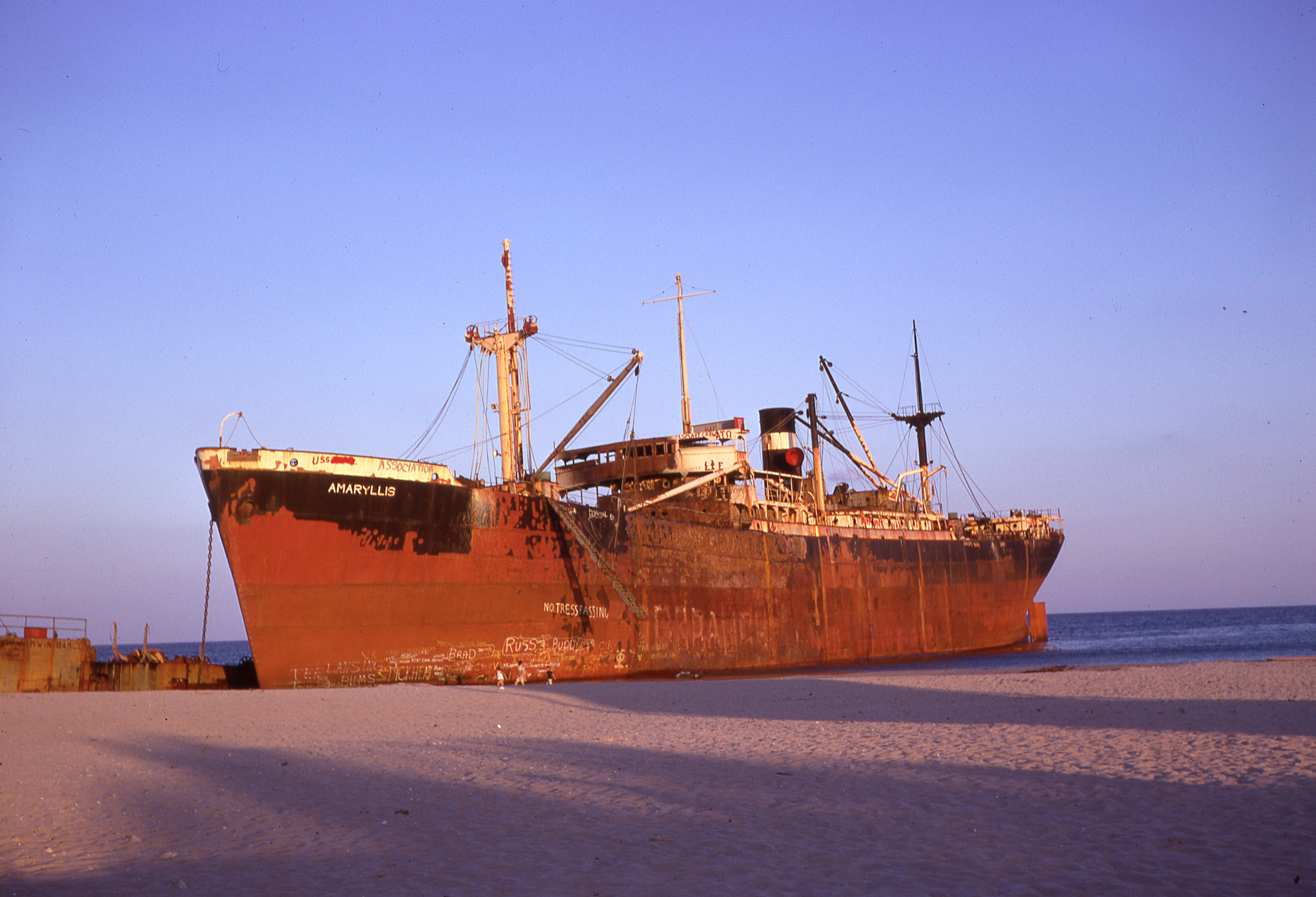
- Amaryllis aground at Singer Island, Florida in July 1967

History
- Name: Cromwell Park, 1945; Harmac Vancouver, 1946; Amaryllis, 1948 on
- Port of registry: Canada, 1945-1948; Panama, 1948 on
- Builder: Burrard Dry Dock Co. Ltd., North Vancouver
- Launched: 1945
- Fate: Wrecked on September 7, 1965, Riviera Beach, Florida; Partially salvaged. Scuttled on August 22, 1968

General characteristics
- Tonnage: 7,147 GRT
- Length: 441.6 ft (134.60 m)
- Beam: 57.2 ft (17.43 m)
- Propulsion: steam
- Speed: 11 kn (20 km/h; 13 mph)

Amaryllis was a cargo ship built in 1945 at Burrard Dry Dock in Vancouver, British Columbia, Canada. She was 441.6 feet (134.6 m) long and measured 7,147 gross register tons. Originally named Cromwell Park, she was built for the government of Canada to be used in World War II. In 1946 she was sold to Canadian Transportation Co. Ltd. which renamed her the Harmac Vancouver. In 1948, she was sold to Greek shipowner Kydoniefs, renamed the Amaryllis and registered in Panama. In 1965, she ran aground during Hurricane Betsy off the coast of Florida and was later sunk offshore as an artificial reef at 26°47′17″N 80°00′58″W.

== Grounding ==
As Hurricane Betsy approached the east coast of Florida on September 7, 1965, Amaryllis, bound from Manchester, England to Baton Rouge, Louisiana with a Greek crew of 30, sought refuge in the Port of Palm Beach in Riviera Beach, Florida. As she approached the Palm Beach Inlet from the Atlantic Ocean into the port, she suffered steering problems in addition to the high winds and seas, which resulted in her being forced into the shallow waters laced with coral reefs north of the inlet. Sometime during the night of September 7–8, she ran aground on the Singer Island beach in front of the Rutledge Motel, later known as the Rutledge Inn, in Riviera Beach. During the next day the winds and seas increased as Hurricane Betsy made her landfall to the south in Key Largo; this pounding wedged the ship farther onto the beach.

The ship almost immediately became an attraction for sightseers and locals, who came to view her and listen to her Greek crew strum their musical instruments. She soon became a magnet for surfers. Since none of the Greek crewmen spoke English, a local interpreter was required for the Coast Guard to communicate with them. All of the crew except for two who jumped ship, and were later picked up in Memphis, remained on the ship until November when her owners made arrangements for them to leave the country.

After several unsuccessful salvage attempts by the original owners and a Miami man who bought her from them, the ship was abandoned and became a menace to those people daring enough to board and wander through her, as well as a concern for the motel owner whose guests were annoyed by the sightseers and kept awake at night by clanging noises from the ship. Oil seepage fouled the water and beach and one fire broke out on the ship. Local residents and officials became concerned about the danger of further damage to the coral reef by the ship as well as the discharge of large quantities of bunker oil from the ship if she broke up.

The Army Corps of Engineers became involved in dismantling the ship and removing the oil. On August 22, 1968, her remains were "towed three-fourths of a mile out to sea and sunk in 85 feet (26 m) of water" to create an artificial reef. Cleanup of the beach and removal of debris from the ship took over a year.

== Status ==
Only the ship's hull and lower deck remain at the artificial reef site. Amaryllis is part of a string of four wrecks, another of which is the Mizpah, and two rock piles north of the Palm Beach Inlet known today as The Corridors, all of which are classified as "advanced dive sites." Local knowledge is required.

== In the media ==
Amaryllis was used as a backdrop in the 1967–1968 daytime game show Treasure Isle hosted by John Bartholomew Tucker. The show was actually shot a mile or so south of the ship at John D. MacArthur's Colonnades Beach Hotel in Palm Beach Shores.
