= Stevan Dohanos =

American artist and illustrator (1907–1994)

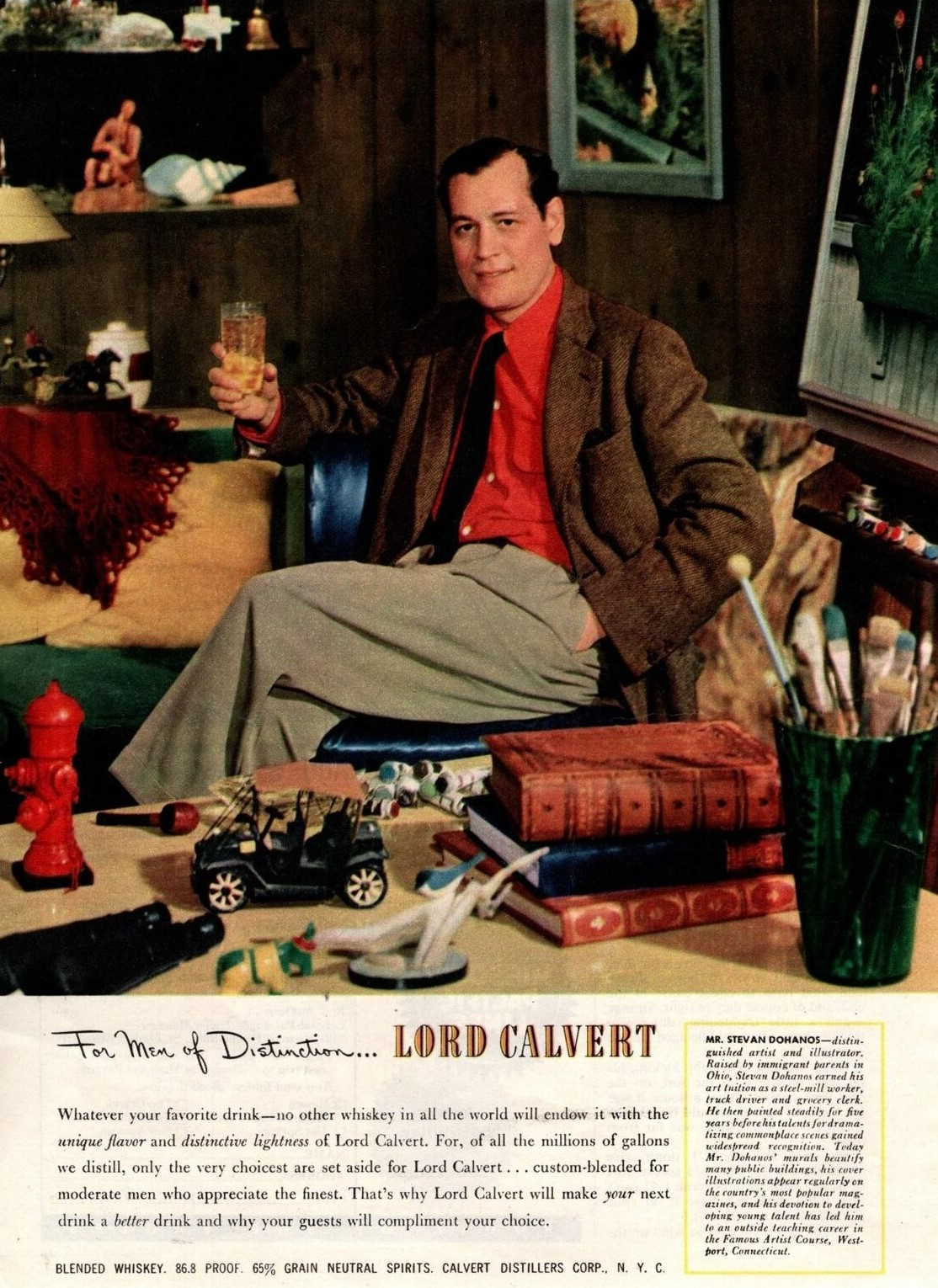
- Stevan Dohanos in a whiskey ad in 1951
- Born: Stevan Dohanos; May 18, 1907; Lorain, Ohio
- Died: July 4, 1994 (aged 87)
- Occupations: artist and illustrator
- Years active: 1930s–1970s
- Known for: Saturday Evening Post covers, U.S. post office murals

Stevan Dohanos (May 18, 1907 – July 4, 1994) was an American artist and illustrator of the social realism school, best known for his Saturday Evening Post covers, and responsible for several of the Don't Talk set of World War II propaganda posters. He named Grant Wood and Edward Hopper as the greatest influences on his painting.

== Life ==
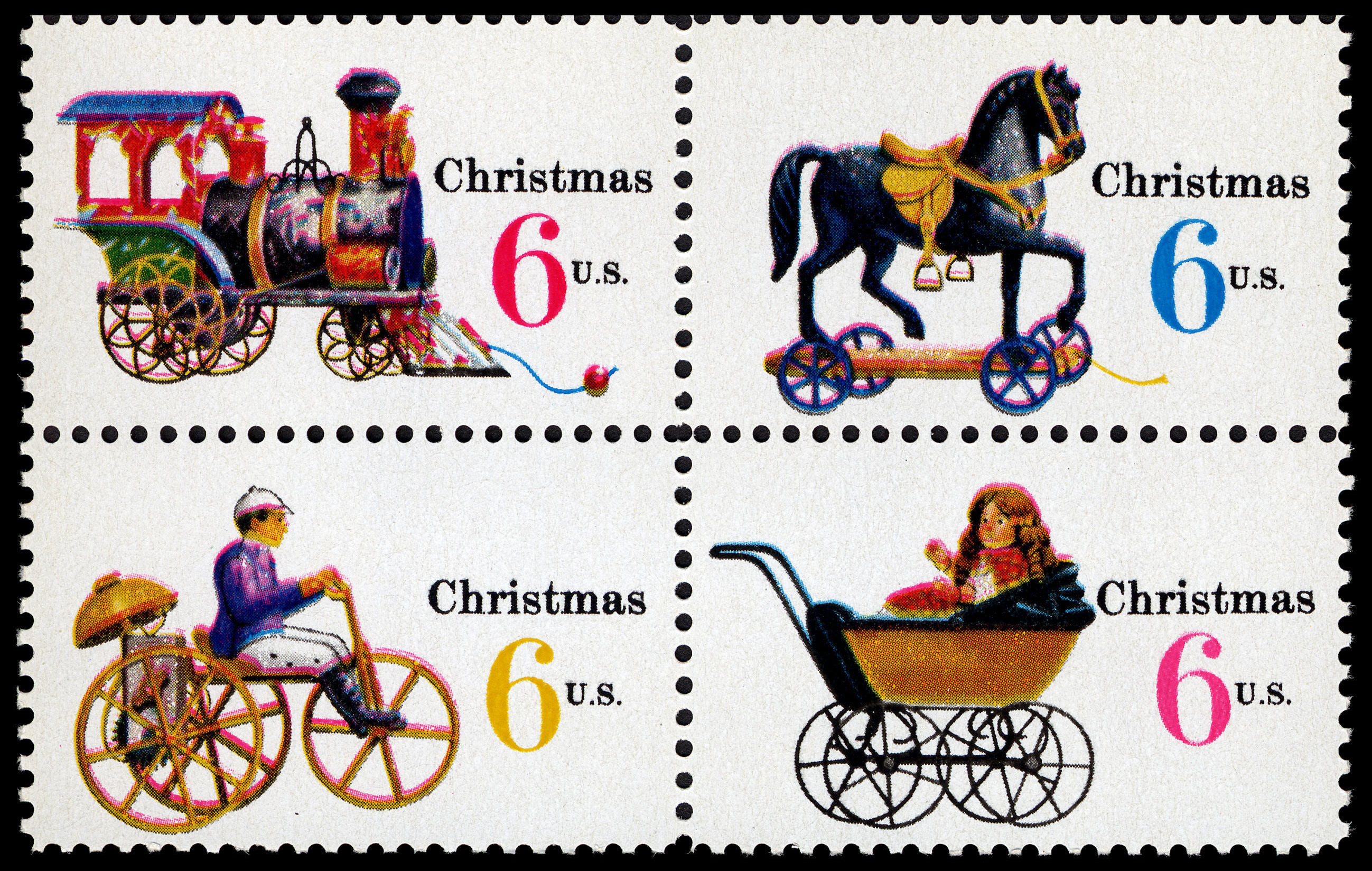
"Christmas Toys" – set of four 6¢ U.S. stamps (1970)

Dohanos was born in Lorain, Ohio and attended the Cleveland School of Art. He worked in fine art as well as in commercial art. In the 1930s he briefly experimented with lithography and wood etching. He was a member of the National Society of Mural Painters and the Society of Illustrators. He was a founding faculty member of the Famous Artists School of Westport, Connecticut.

Dohanos worked for the Section of Painting and Sculpture of the U.S. Treasury Department, painting several post office murals, including those for West Palm Beach and Charlotte Amalie.

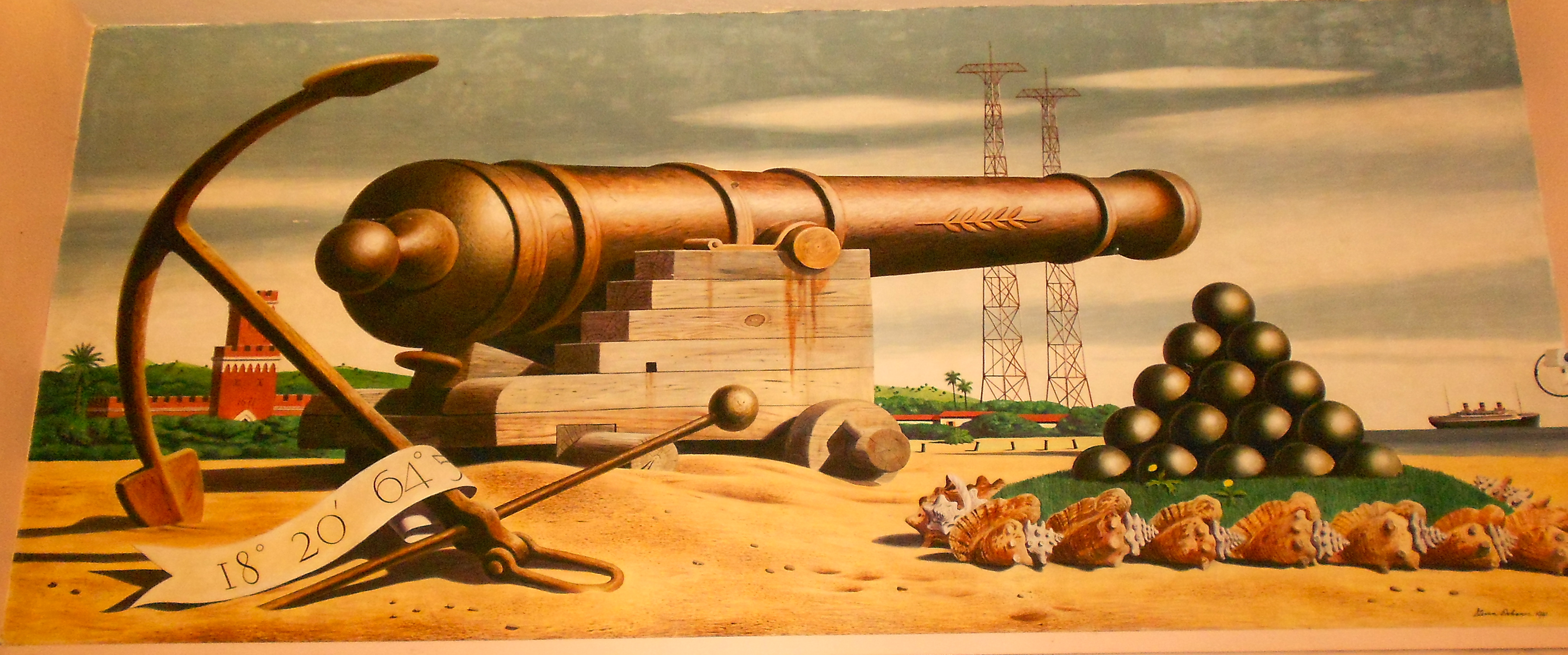
1941 mural in the Post Office in Charlotte Amalie, U.S. Virgin Islands

His first magazine illustration was for McCall's in 1938. In the early 1940s, he moved to Westport, Connecticut, and in 1942 he sold his first cover painting to The Saturday Evening Post. Dohanos went on to paint over 125 Post covers during the 1940s and 1950s. He also illustrated for Esquire and other magazines.

In the 1960s he became chairman of the Citizens' Stamp Advisory Committee, which selected art to appear on United States postage stamps. He selected art for over 300 postage stamps during the administration of seven Presidents of the United States and nine Postmasters General. In 1984, the Postal Service's Hall of Stamps in Washington was dedicated in his honor.

His easel paintings and prints have been displayed in the Cleveland Museum of Art, Whitney Museum of American Art, Pennsylvania Academy of the Fine Arts, and Dartmouth College. He was nationally known as an illustrator and magazine cover artist, particularly for his work appearing in The Saturday Evening Post.

Dohanos died July 4, 1994, 87 years old.

== See also ==
- Barefoot Mailman

== Sources ==
- The United States Air Force Art Collection - Brief biography of Stevan Dohanos - URL retrieved November 8, 2005
- Another brief biography of Stevan Dohanos - URL retrieved December 22, 2005
- "Treasury Department Section of Painting and Sculpture"

== Sources ==
- Delaney, Arthur A "Social realism in WPA-era post office murals", Stamps, ISSN 0038-9358, 02/1995, Volume 250, Issue 9, p. 8
- Park, Marlene, Democratic vistas : post offices and public art in the New Deal Philadelphia: Temple University Press, 1984. ISBN 0-87722-348-3
- Siboroski, Paul Michael The production of art under the treasury section of fine arts during the new deal: six murals in the West Palm Beach Post Office by Stevan Dohanos, Federal Art Project, 1988
