= Finntown =

Quarter populated by Finnish American people

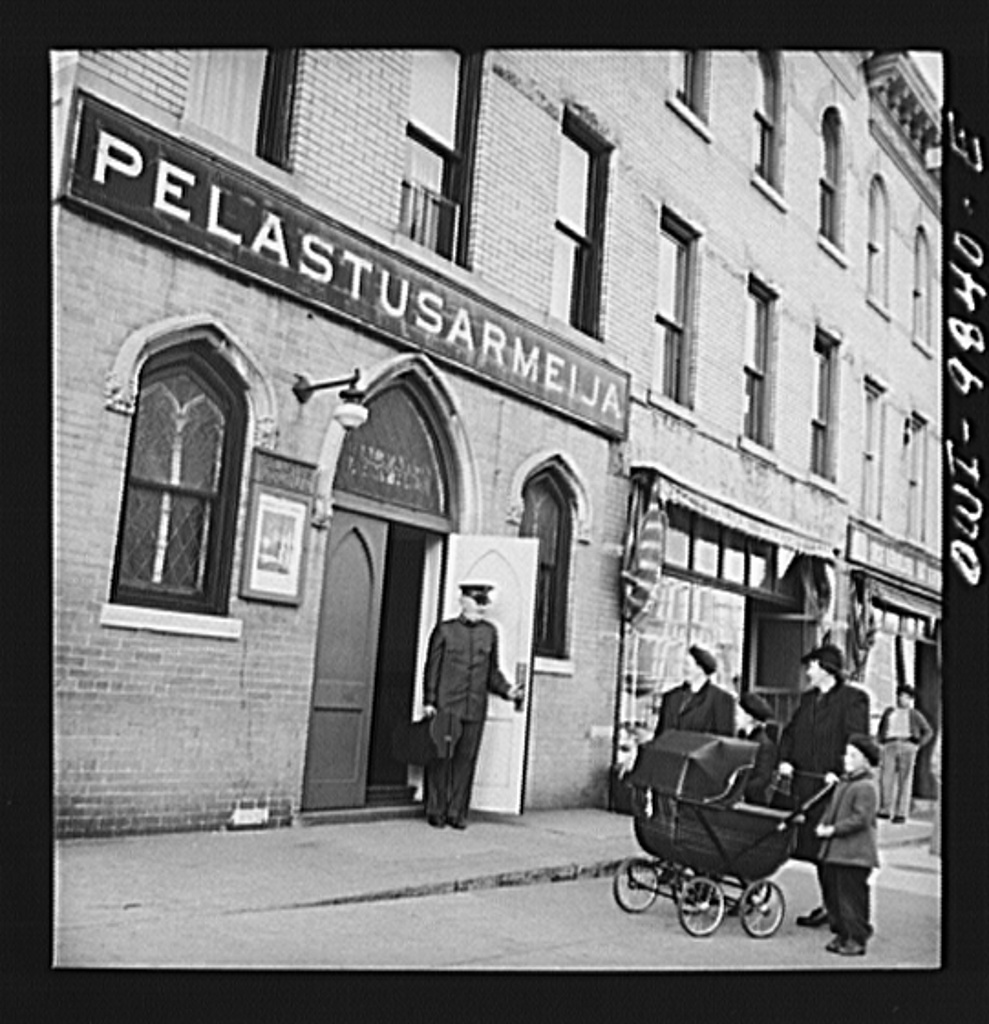
Finnish branch of the Salvation Army in Brooklyn's Finntown (1942).

A Finntown (Finnish: Suomalainen kaupunki) is a quarter populated by Finns in the cities and big villages of the United States and elsewhere. In the United States, there were a dozen Finntowns. In the Finntowns are services for Finnish people, usually at least a co-op store, a church and a town hall. In the biggest Finntowns, there are, for example, saunas, restaurants, hotels, shoemakers, tailors, barbers and record stores all serving in Finnish. The biggest communities of Finnish Americans were in Brooklyn, New York and in Harlem, in Hancock, Michigan, in Duluth, Minnesota, in Butte, Montana, in Astoria, Oregon, Chicago, Berkeley, California, Ashtabula, Ohio and Cleveland.

The biggest Finnish-American communities are in Lake Worth and Lantana in Florida. There are 18,000 Finnish residents, both old and new immigrants.

Finntowns can also be found in other countries with huge Finnish diasporas, like Sweden (Eskilstuna), Canada (Thunder Bay and New Finland) and Russia (parts of Karelia and Leningrad Oblast).

== See also ==
- Ethnic enclave
- Finnish diaspora

== Sources ==
- Pitkänen, Silja & Sutinen, Ville-Juhani: Amerikansuomalaisten tarina, Tammi, 2014. ISBN 978-951-31-7568-9.
- Turun Sanomat, 5 April in 2006, https://www.ts.fi/teemat/1074112019
