= Port of Palm Beach =

Sea port in Florida, US

- Logo

- Location in USA

Location
- Country: United States
- Location: Riviera Beach, Florida
- Coordinates: 26°46′01″N 80°03′04″W
- UN/LOCODE: USPBC

Details
- Type of harbour: Natural/Artificial
- Size: 971 square miles (2,510 km^{2})
- No. of berths: 17
- Draft depth: 37 ft.
- Employees: 59
- Executive Director: Manuel Almira

Statistics
- Annual cargo tonnage: 2,308,770
- Annual container volume: 279,900
- Value of cargo: $6.6 billion
- Passenger traffic: 450,000
- Annual revenue: $19 million
- Website www.portofpalmbeach.com

The Port of Palm Beach is located in Riviera Beach, Florida, United States, in Palm Beach County. The port is an independent taxing district, with a five-member board of commissioners elected at large by voters within the district. The port district covers a land area of 971 square miles (2,510 km^{2}) or approximately fifty percent of the Palm Beach County area. The port is administered by an Executive Director and professional staff of 59 full-time employees.

== General Information ==
The Port of Palm Beach is located 72 miles (116 km) north of Miami and 150 miles (240 km) south of Port Canaveral. The 300-foot-wide (91 m) ship channel and 1,100-by-1,400-foot (430 m) turning basin are in Lake Worth, and connect to the Atlantic Ocean through the Lake Worth Inlet. The nominal depth at mean low water of the channel and turning basin is 32 feet (9.8 m). The Port has three slips, four marginal wharves, and two roll-on/roll-off ramps, and a cruise terminal.

The Port of Palm Beach is the fourth busiest container port in Florida and the twenty-fifth busiest in the continental United States. In addition to intermodal capacity, the Port is a major nodal point for the shipment of bulk sugar, molasses, cement, utility fuels, water, produce and breakbulk items. With the exception of the spiced rum brand, all Cruzan Rum is shipped from St. Croix to the Port of Palm Beach to be bottled.

In fiscal year 2019 (October, 2018 through September, 2019), the Port of Palm Beach served 1,273 cargo ships carrying more than 1.2 million short tons in approximately 280,000 TEUs, more than 2.3 million short tons of total cargo tonnage, and almost 450,000 cruise passengers.

In 2010, Celebration Cruise Line opened a 2-day cruise, every other day, to the Bahamas from the Port of Palm Beach using the nearly new passenger terminal. This was effectively replaced by Margaritaville at Sea, which currently operates cruises from the Port of Palm Beach with the Margaritaville at Sea Paradise.

== Gallery ==
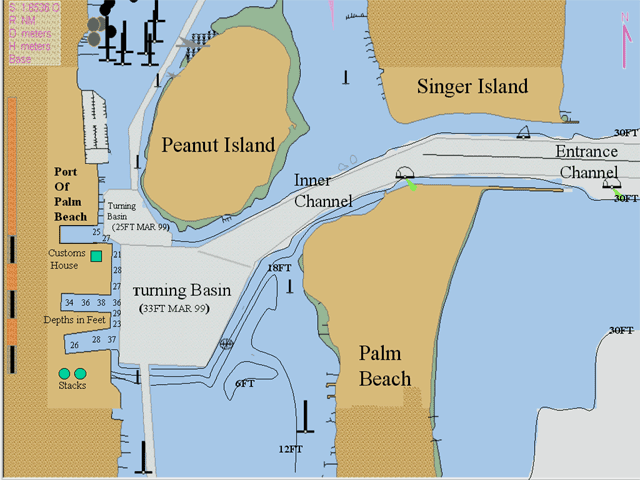
Map of the Channel and Harbor of Port of Palm Beach

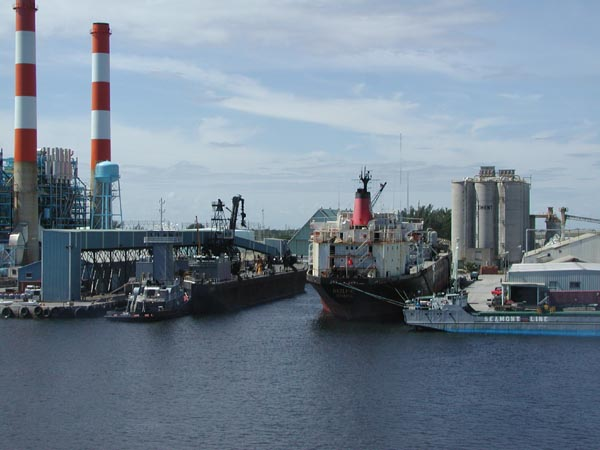
A view of slip 3 of The Port of Palm Beach

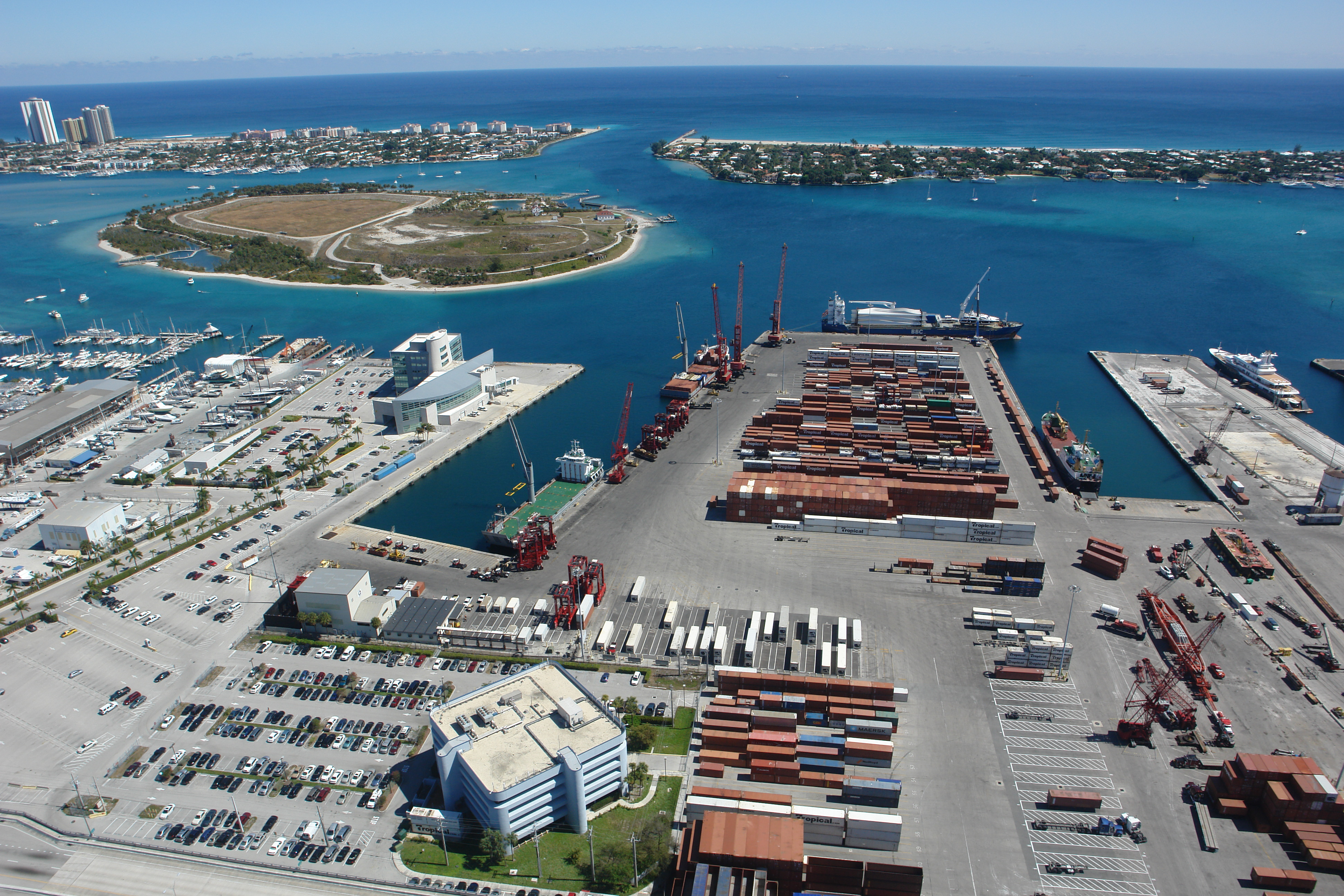
Port of Palm Beach Lake Worth inlet to harbor from Atlantic Ocean.

== See also ==
- Amaryllis (ship)
- United States container ports
