= Hypoluxo, Florida =

Town in the state of Florida, United States

- Town
- Town of Hypoluxo
- Seal
- Motto: "The Home of the Barefoot Mailman"
- Interactive map of Hypoluxo, Florida
- Coordinates: 26°33′48″N 80°03′11″W
- Country: United States
- State: Florida
- County: Palm Beach
- Settled: c. 1872–1885
- Incorporated: 1955

Government
  - Type: Mayor-Council
  - Mayor: Michael C. Brown
  - Vice Mayor: Richard "Dick" J. Roney
  - Council Members: Linda Allen, Doug Besecker, John Sochacki, and Stephanie Kahlert
  - Deputy Clerk: Dixie L. Gualtieri
  - Town Attorney: Leonard G. Rubin

Area
  - Total: 0.81 sq mi (2.09 km^{2})
  - Land: 0.57 sq mi (1.47 km^{2})
  - Water: 0.24 sq mi (0.62 km^{2})
- Elevation: 0 ft (0 m)

Population (2020)
  - Total: 2,687
  - Density: 4,736.6/sq mi (1,828.83/km^{2})
- Time zone: UTC-5 (Eastern (EST))
  - Summer (DST): UTC-4 (EDT)
- ZIP code: 33462
- Area codes: 561, 728
- FIPS code: 12-33150
- GNIS feature ID: 2405878
- Website: www.hypoluxo.org

Hypoluxo is a town in Palm Beach County, Florida, United States. The town was incorporated in 1955 and is part of the Miami metropolitan area of South Florida. It is home to the Hypoluxo Scrub Natural Area, which is a protected landscape. The population was 2,687 at the 2020 US Census.

== Etymology ==
The origin of the name "Hypoluxo" is disputed. One theory analyzed the name as composed of the Greek root "hypo-" (under, below average) and the Latin "lux" (light). Hannibel Pierce settled on Hypoluxo Island with his family in 1872. His son, Charlie W. Pierce reported that a Seminole woman told his mother that the Seminole name for Lake Worth Lagoon was Hypoluxo, which he thought meant 'island', or as he put it using his marginal command of the English language: "water all around, no get out". The name that the Pierces wrote as "Hypoluxo" was given as "Opoloccha" in a history posted by the Town of Hypoluxo. J. Clarence Simpson, citing William A. Read, states that the name is from the Creek-Seminole Hapo, meaning "mound" and Plotski, meaning "round", thus "round mound". The name "Hypoluxo" appears on an 1841 War Department map.

== History ==
The area that is now the Town of Hypoluxo was temporarily settled and named in 1872, but permanently settled in 1884 by Andrew Walton Garnett, James Edward Hamilton and James William Porter. Gannett and Hamilton carried the mail between the Lake Worth Beach area and Miami as barefoot mailmen. In 1955, it was officially incorporated as a town.

== Geography ==
Hypoluxo is on the mainland shore of Lake Worth Lagoon and does not include any of Hypoluxo Island.

According to the United States Census Bureau, the town has a total area of 0.8 square miles (2.1 km^{2}), of which 0.6 square miles (1.6 km^{2}) is land and 0.2 square miles (0.52 km^{2}) (28.05%) is water.

== Demographics ==
Historical population
Census	Pop.	Note	%±
1960	114		—
1970	336		194.7%
1980	573		70.5%
1990	830		44.9%
2000	2,015		142.8%
2010	2,588		28.4%
2020	2,687		3.8%
U.S. Decennial Census

=== 2020 census ===
As of the 2020 census, Hypoluxo had a population of 2,687. The median age was 54.6 years. 9.8% of residents were under the age of 18 and 29.3% of residents were 65 years of age or older. For every 100 females there were 89.5 males, and for every 100 females age 18 and over there were 87.6 males age 18 and over.

100.0% of residents lived in urban areas, while 0.0% lived in rural areas.

There were 1,449 households in Hypoluxo, of which 14.5% had children under the age of 18 living in them. Of all households, 37.0% were married-couple households, 22.4% were households with a male householder and no spouse or partner present, and 31.9% were households with a female householder and no spouse or partner present. About 39.2% of all households were made up of individuals and 15.8% had someone living alone who was 65 years of age or older.

There were 2,101 housing units, of which 31.0% were vacant. The homeowner vacancy rate was 1.9% and the rental vacancy rate was 8.3%.

Hypoluxo racial composition (Hispanics excluded from racial categories) (NH = Non-Hispanic)
Race	Number	Percentage
White (NH)	1,987	73.95%
Black or African American (NH)	170	6.33%
Native American or Alaska Native (NH)	4	0.15%
Asian (NH)	38	1.41%
Pacific Islander or Native Hawaiian (NH)	1	0.04%
Some other race (NH)	27	1.00%
Two or more races/Multiracial (NH)	115	4.28%
Hispanic or Latino (any race)	345	12.84%
Total	2,687	100.00%

According to the 2020 American Community Survey 5-year estimates, there were 717 families residing in the town.

=== 2010 census ===
Hypoluxo Demographics
2010 Census	Hypoluxo	Palm Beach County	Florida
Total population	2,588	1,320,134	18,801,310
Population, percent change, 2000 to 2010	+28.4%	+16.7%	+17.6%
Population density	4,174.2/sq mi	670.2/sq mi	350.6/sq mi
White or Caucasian (including White Hispanic)	87.9%	73.5%	75.0%
(Non-Hispanic White or Caucasian)	83.1%	60.1%	57.9%
Black or African-American	6.7%	17.3%	16.0%
Hispanic or Latino (of any race)	6.8%	19.0%	22.5%
Asian	1.7%	2.4%	2.4%
Native American or Native Alaskan	0.0%	0.5%	0.4%
Pacific Islander or Native Hawaiian	0.0%	0.1%	0.1%
Two or more races (Multiracial)	0.6%	2.3%	2.5%
Some Other Race	1.5%	3.9%	3.6%

As of the 2010 United States census, there were 2,588 people, 1,189 households, and 641 families residing in the town.

=== 2000 census ===
As of the census of 2000, there were 2,015 people, 1,112 households, and 549 families residing in the town. The population density was 3,389.2 inhabitants per square mile (1,308.6/km^{2}). There were 1,606 housing units at an average density of 2,701.3 per square mile (1,043.0/km^{2}). The racial makeup of the town was 90.62% White (87.8% were Non-Hispanic White), 4.22% African American, 0.10% Native American, 1.74% Asian, 0.99% from other races, and 2.33% from two or more races. Hispanic or Latino of any race were 4.57% of the population.

In 2000, there were 1,112 households, out of which 9.8% had children under the age of 18 living with them, 41.7% were married couples living together, 5.7% had a female householder with no husband present, and 50.6% were non-families. 39.0% of all households were made up of individuals, and 11.5% had someone living alone who was 65 years of age or older. The average household size was 1.81 and the average family size was 2.33.

In 2000, in the town, the population was spread out, with 8.8% under the age of 18, 4.8% from 18 to 24, 30.3% from 25 to 44, 30.6% from 45 to 64, and 25.6% who were 65 years of age or older. The median age was 49 years. For every 100 females, there were 96.0 males. For every 100 females age 18 and over, there were 92.0 males.

In 2000, the median income for a household in the town was $50,284, and the median income for a family was $64,375. Males had a median income of $50,431 versus $32,647 for females. The per capita income for the town was $43,960. About 8.6% of families and 7.1% of the population were below the poverty line, including 10.5% of those under age 18 and 5.5% of those age 65 or over.

As of 2000, English as a first language accounted for 86.65% of all residents, while the mother tongues of French comprised 5.38%, Finnish consisted of 4.52%, Spanish was at 2.42%, and Italian made up 1.02% of the population.

As of 2000, Hypoluxo had the twelfth highest percentage of Canadian residents in the US (tied with four other US areas,) which accounted 5.40% of all residents, while it can be assumed that because of the percentage of Finnish speakers, Finns were around 4.52% of town's population.

== Controversies ==
The city government of Hypoluxo claims that certain streets, particularly in Hypoluxo Park, have a "public designation" but are not maintained by the city. As a result, some areas are maintained neither by the city nor any neighborhood association. For example, a seawall on the Intracoastal Waterway in Hypoluxo Park failed in 2019, leading to a dispute over whether the city would pay for repairs.
