= Lake Worth Inlet =

Ocean inlet in Florida, US

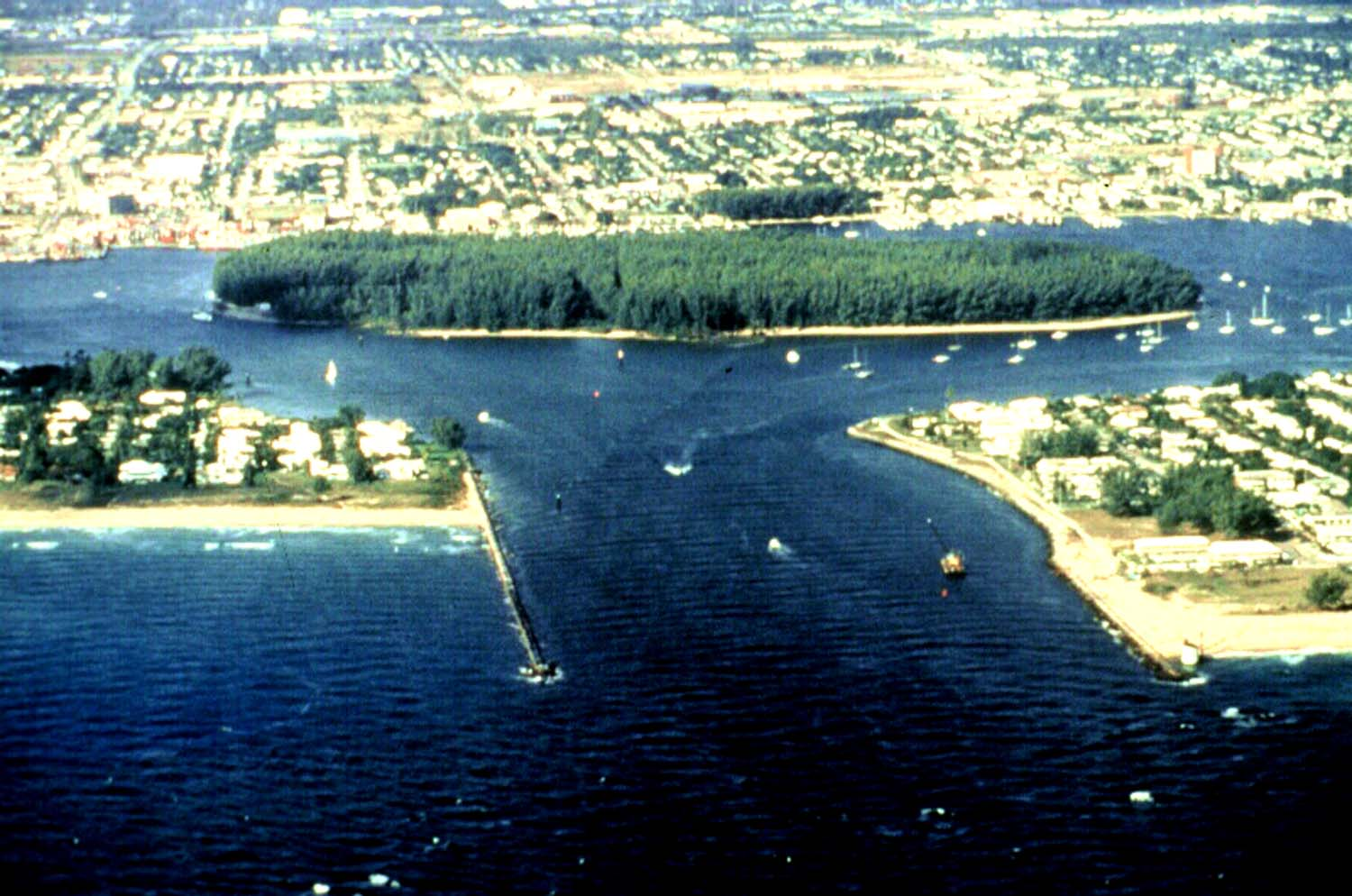
Palm Beach Inlet, also known as Lake Worth Inlet

The Palm Beach Inlet, also known as the Lake Worth Inlet, is an artificial cut through a barrier island connecting the northern part of the Lake Worth Lagoon in Palm Beach County, Florida with the Atlantic Ocean. It is bordered by the town of Palm Beach on the south, and by the town of Palm Beach Shores to the north. The inlet is also the entrance channel for the Port of Palm Beach. Its coordinates are 26°46′20″N 80°02′14″W.

== History ==
In the mid-19th century the body of water that is now the Lake Worth Lagoon was a freshwater lake. This had been named Lake Worth in honor of William J. Worth, commander of the Eighth Infantry Regiment in the Second Seminole War. There were no rivers or streams flowing into the lake; all of the flow into the lake was by ground seepage from the Everglades to the west. The only outflow from the lake was through a swamp that became the Lake Worth Creek as it approached the Loxahatchee River and Jupiter Inlet.

In 1866 travelers reported that fresh water was pouring out of the lake into the ocean at a point about ten miles south of the Jupiter Inlet. One report is that a settler named Lang had dug the channel to open an inlet, and it was known as Lang's Inlet for a while. This cut drained the lake down to sea level. The limited inflow of ocean water through the inlet and continued seepage of fresh water from the Everglades kept the lake from becoming more than mildly brackish.

The inlet tended to silt up, and had to be dug out again every few months. In 1877 the settlers around the lake decided to dig a new inlet at a point about a mile north of Lang's Inlet where a rock formation called the Black Rocks would provide some protection for the inlet. The point chosen on the barrier island was only about 300 feet wide, but the beach dune ridge was 20 feet high and covered by heavy growth. All of the work was done with axes, shovels, hoes and wheelbarrows. It took 20 men several weeks to dig the new inlet.

The new inlet served its intended purpose well. The inlet tended to migrate south, however, with the current wearing away at the southern bank and depositing sand on the northern bank. By 1886 the inlet had migrated about a mile south of the Black Rocks, and closed up during a storm. An inlet was again dug through just south of the Black Rocks.

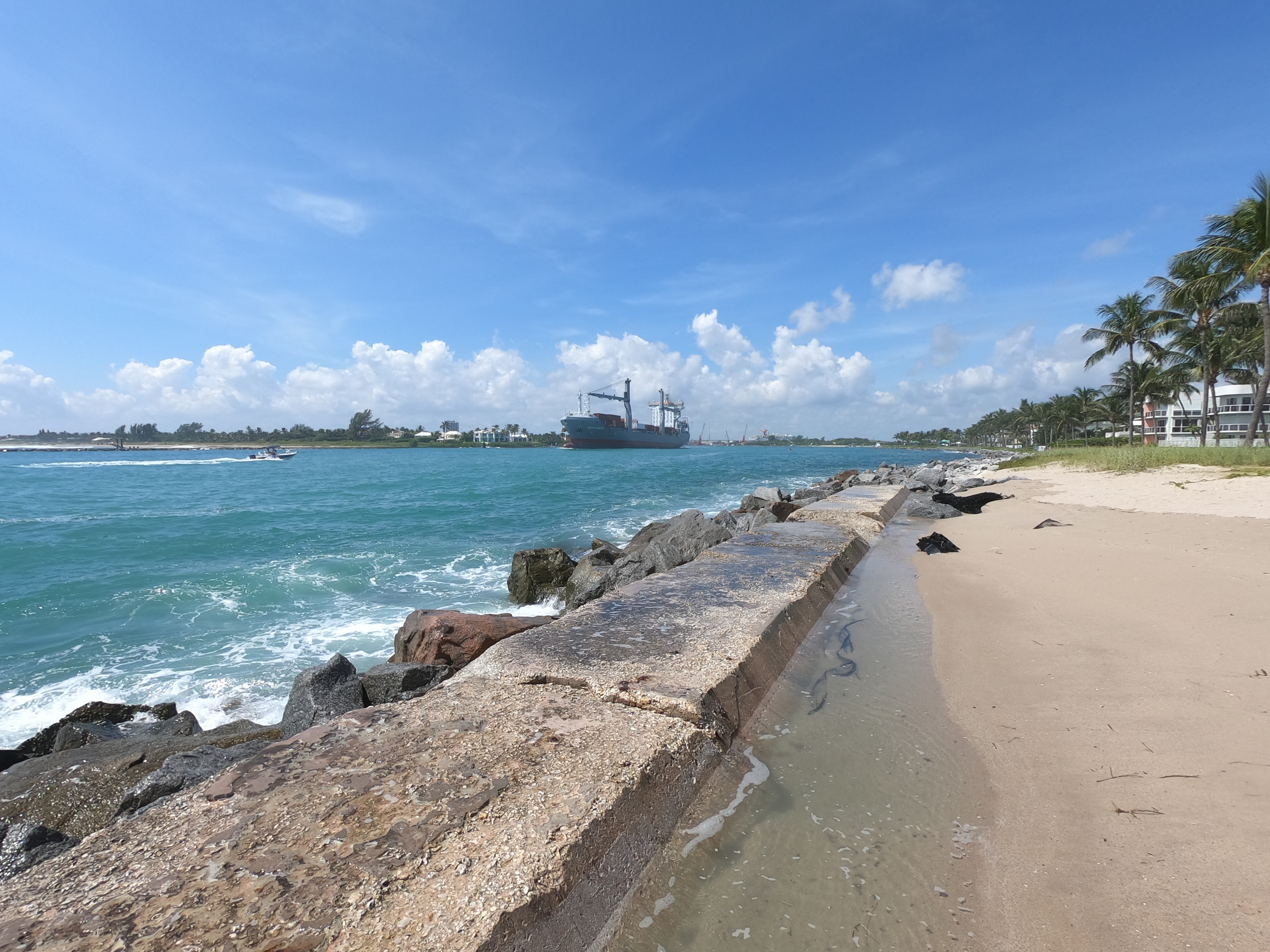
Tropic Lissette sailing out of Palm Beach Inlet to The Bahamas.

In 1893 Henry Flagler, who would complete construction of his Florida East Coast Railway to West Palm Beach in 1894, had the inlet enlarged. The federal government turned down a request to improve the inlet in 1912. In 1915 the Florida Legislature chartered the Lake Worth Inlet District (which later became the Port of Palm Beach District). The site of the original Lang's Inlet was chosen for the new inlet, which was completed in 1917.

The old inlet at the Black Rocks was still open. A community of fishermen from the Bahamas had settled on the barrier island just north of the Black Rocks, and they periodically cleared the channel when it silted up. A storm closed the inlet at the Black Rocks in 1919, and the fishermen, who were squatting on the island, were forced off by its owners and moved to Riviera (now Riviera Beach).

The new Lake Worth Inlet was improved several times over the next decade. The federal government assumed responsibility for the inlet in 1935, and continued to widen and deepen it and build up the jetties. In 1967 the inlet was dredged to a depth of 35 feet, which has been maintained since then. A sand transfer plant pumps sand from the north side of the inlet to the south side in order to maintain the natural flow of sand southward along the coast.

== See also ==
- Amaryllis (ship)
