= Lake Worth Lagoon =

Lagoon in Florida, US

Lake Worth
- Interactive map of Lake Worth
- Location: Palm Beach County, Florida
- Coordinates: 26°40′53″N 80°02′45″W
- Type: Lagoon
- Etymology: Named for William J. Worth
- Primary inflows: West Palm Beach Canal
- Primary outflows: Lake Worth Inlet, South Lake Worth Inlet
- Max. length: 21 miles (34 km)
- Max. width: 1 mile (1.6 km)

The Lake Worth Lagoon is a lagoon located in Palm Beach County, Florida. It runs parallel to the coast, and is separated from the Atlantic Ocean by barrier beaches, including Palm Beach Island. The lagoon is connected to the Atlantic Ocean by two permanent, man-made inlets.

== Geography ==
Lake Worth Lagoon is located at coordinates 26°40′53″N 80°02′45″W. It is approximately 21 miles (34 km) long and up to a mile wide. The Lake Worth Inlet connects the northern part of the lagoon to the ocean. It is the entrance channel to the Port of Palm Beach. The South Lake Worth Inlet (also known as the Boynton Inlet) connects the southern part of the lagoon to the ocean. It is used primarily by recreational boaters. The Atlantic Intracoastal Waterway runs the entire length of the lagoon. Eight causeways and bridges connect the mainland to the barrier beaches, including Palm Beach Island.

== Etymology ==
The lagoon is named "Lake Worth" in honor of William J. Worth, last commander of United States troops in the Second Seminole War. The Seminole language (Note: The historical record does not specify whether this was the Muskogee language (formerly called "Creek") or Mikasuki language, which were spoken by different bands of Seminoles.) name for the lagoon, as given by a Seminole informant in 1870, was Hypoluxo, translated as "water all around no get out", referring to the landlocked status of the lagoon.

== History ==
In the mid-19th century the Lake Worth Lagoon was a fresh water lake. There were no rivers or streams flowing into the lake; all of the flow into the lake was by ground seepage from the Everglades to the west. Extreme high tides and waves, high lake water levels and storms occasionally caused the formation of temporary inlets that quickly closed up again. When there was no inlet available, the settlers in the area had to haul their boats over the barrier beaches to move them between the ocean and the lake.

In 1866 travelers reported that fresh water was pouring out of the lake into the ocean at a point about ten miles (16 km) south of the Jupiter Inlet. One report is that a settler named August Lang had dug the channel to open an inlet, and it was known as "Lang's Inlet" for a while. This cut drained the lake down to sea level. The limited inflow of ocean water through the inlet and continued seepage of fresh water from the Everglades kept the lake from becoming more than mildly brackish. Lang's Inlet was unstable, and had to be dug out again every few months. Construction of a stable inlet at the "Black Rocks" one mile (1.6 km) north of Lang's Inlet was finally achieved in 1877. The lake immediately began to change to a saltwater lagoon. The completion of a navigation canal from the north end of Lake Worth Lagoon to Jupiter Inlet in the 1880s resulted in increased freshwater discharges to the lagoon.

In the early 1900s, the Atlantic Intracoastal Waterway was completed from the south end of the Lagoon to Biscayne Bay. By 1915, the Port of Palm Beach had created a permanent inlet four feet deep at the old location of Lang's Inlet, which was deepened to 16 feet (4.9 m) in 1925. In 1917 the South Lake Worth Inlet was created in a failed effort to improve tidal circulation and provide flushing to the south end of the Lagoon. The completion of the West Palm Beach Canal (which connected to Lake Okeechobee, draining land west of West Palm Beach as well as the Everglades) in 1925 resulted in significant freshwater inflow to the lagoon.

On January 19, 1930, a Ryan B-5 Brougham of Florida Airways crashed in the lagoon during a passenger flight from West End, Bahamas to Daytona Beach, killing three of the five occupants. The cause of the crash is unknown.

== Development ==
Lake Worth Lagoon is completely surrounded by the urbanized area of Palm Beach County. Much of the shoreline has been dredged and filled-in. Bulkheads now line 81 percent of the shoreline of the lagoon. Mangroves, which once lined most of the shoreline of the lagoon, have been reduced to just 283 acres (115 ha). Several bridges cross the lagoon. Man-made inlets from the ocean allow salt water to mix with fresh water in the lagoon. Man-made canals dump varying amounts of fresh water into the lagoon. Untreated stormwater from the surrounding urban areas flows into the lagoon. The Port of Palm Beach, several marinas and a power plant on the shores of the lagoon also add pollution to the lagoon. Since 1994, there has been heightened awareness of the need for water quality improvements and habitat restoration and enhancement within the Lagoon. A Lake Worth Lagoon Management Plan was approved in 1998, updated in 2013, to guide the Lagoon's restoration and enhancement.

== "Muck monster" ==
An unexplained wake in the lagoon on August 24, 2009, was caught on tape by a local group known as the LagoonKeepers, who named it "muck monster". The identity and existence of the creature remains unconfirmed, as it did not break the surface during the time observed. It displayed a wide wake, but then appeared to descend deeper when observers approached within 10 feet.
