= Lantana, Florida =

Town in the state of Florida, United States

- Town
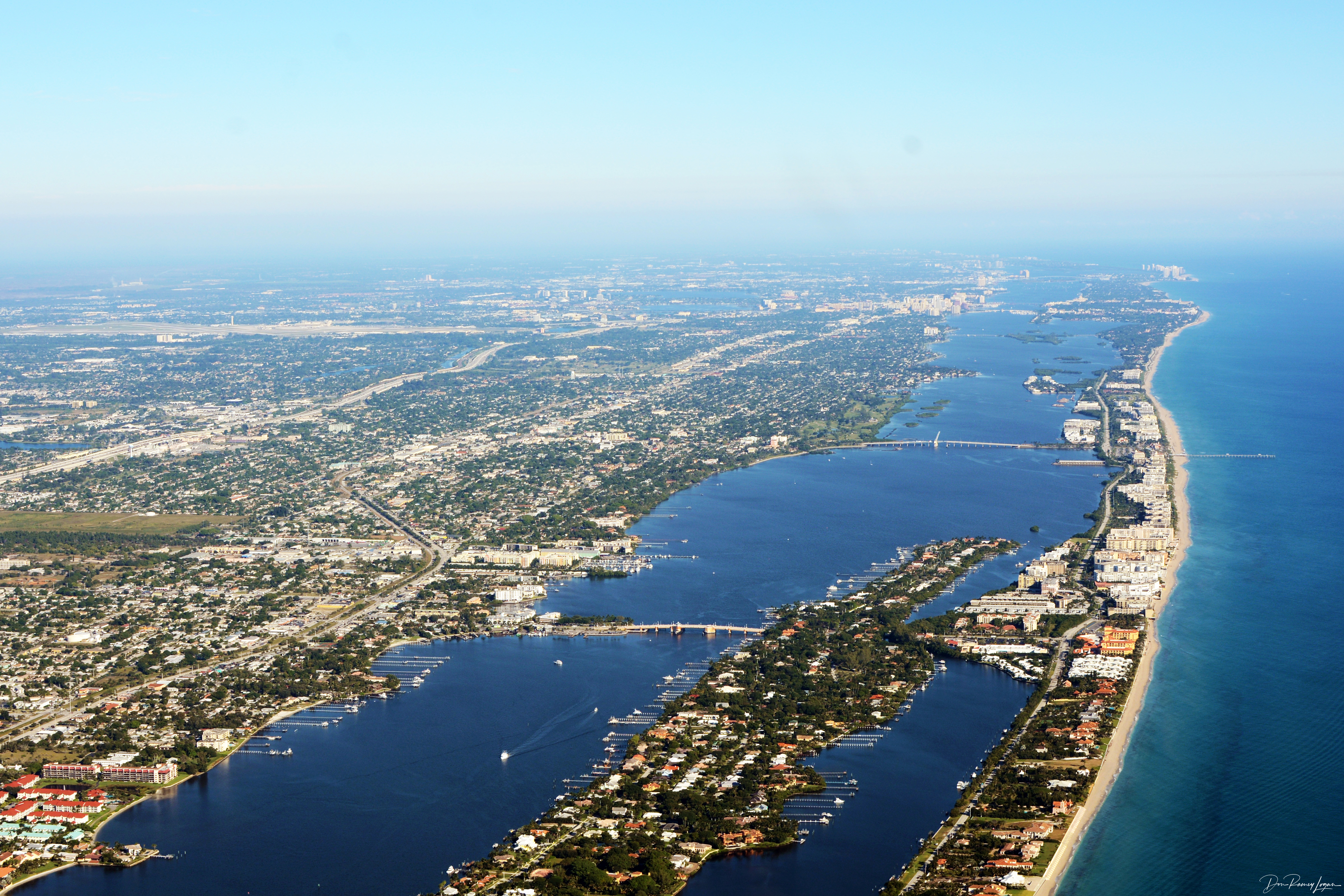
- Aerial view of Lantana and South Palm Beach

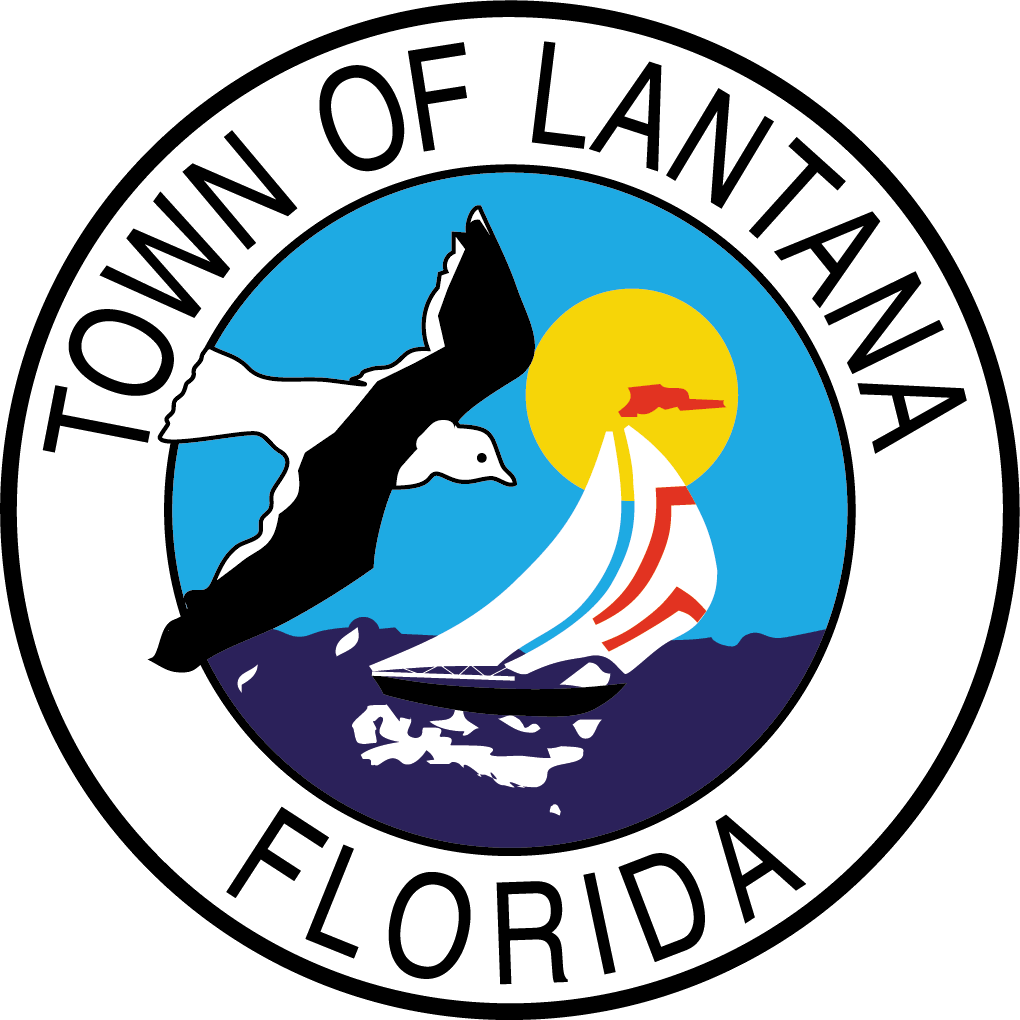
- Seal

- Location of Lantana in Palm Beach County
- Coordinates: 26°35′00″N 80°03′22″W
- Country: United States
- State: Florida
- County: Palm Beach
- Settled (Armed Occupation Act Settlement): c. 1842
- Settled (Lyman Point Settlement): c. 1884–September 21, 1888
- Settled (Lantana Point Settlement): September 22, 1888–1891
- Platted (Lantana Settlement): 1892–July 19, 1921
- Incorporated (Town of Lantana): July 20, 1921
- Named for: Abundant Lantana flowering plants growing wild in the town

Government
  - Type: Council-Manager

Area
  - Total: 2.97 sq mi (7.69 km^{2})
  - Land: 2.37 sq mi (6.13 km^{2})
  - Water: 0.60 sq mi (1.56 km^{2})
- Elevation: 16 ft (4.9 m)

Population (2020)
  - Total: 11,504
  - Density: 4,860.8/sq mi (1,876.77/km^{2})
- Time zone: UTC-5 (Eastern (EST))
  - Summer (DST): UTC-4 (EDT)
- ZIP Code: 33462
- Area codes: 561, 728
- FIPS code: 12-39375
- GNIS feature ID: 2405987
- Website: lantana.org

Lantana is a town in Palm Beach County, Florida, United States. As of the 2020 United States census, its population was 11,504. It is 37 miles (60 km) north of Fort Lauderdale and 62 miles (100 km) north of Miami.

== History ==
The first settlers came to the area after Congress passed the Armed Occupation Act of 1842, at the end of the Seminole Wars, during the administration of President John Tyler. The M.B. Lyman family is credited with founding the town. Lyman arrived with his family in 1888 and, within a year, started several enterprises, including a general store, an Indian trading post, and a post office. As postmaster, Lyman named the post office – Lantana Point – for the wild lantana plants that grew in abundance in the area. The word Point was later dropped.

One of the other Lyman businesses was the Lantana Fish Company. In the early 1900s, the gathering and marketing of oysters became the town's leading industry. The Town of Lantana was incorporated on July 20, 1921, and 22 residents voted in the first election. At the time of incorporation, the area of Lantana was one square mile with a population of 100 residents.

After World War II, Lantana, like the rest of South Florida, experienced a tremendous building boom. Interstate 95, which was completed through Lantana in the mid-1970s, brought a surge of commercial development to the town.

Since 1950, the town had been the site of the A.G. Holley Hospital, the last of the old, state-run sanitariums for patients with tuberculosis. The facility treated about 50 patients at a time, those with the most obdurate forms of the disease. The facility was demolished in November 2014.

From 1974 until 1988, Lantana hosted the tradition of displaying the world's largest decorated Christmas tree. Every year, a huge tree was shipped from the Pacific Northwest to Lantana by rail to the grounds of the National Enquirer, adjacent to the Florida East Coast Railway tracks. The event attracted many visitors each night and became one of the holiday events in South Florida. This ended in 1989 due to the sale of the National Enquirer following the death of its founder, Generoso Pope Jr., at the age of 61 in October 1988.

In 2025, the Florida Supreme Court let stand more than $100,000 in fines the town levied on a homeowner for having allowed cars to be parked on her property with two tires occasionally resting on the lawn.

== Geography ==
According to the United States Census Bureau, the town has a total area of 2.9 square miles (7.5 km^{2}), of which 0.6 sq mi (1.6 km^{2}) (21.31%) is covered by water.

=== Climate ===
Lantana has a tropical climate, more specifically a tropical rainforest climate (Köppen climate classification Af), as its driest month (February) averages 2.55 in (64.8 mm) of precipitation, meeting the minimum standard of 60 mm in the driest month needed to qualify for that designation. Much of the year is warm to hot in Lantana, and frost is extremely rare. As is typical in the Miami metropolitan area, two basic seasons occur in Lantana, a mild and dry winter (November through April), and a hot and wet summer (May through October). Daily thundershowers are common in the hot season, though they are brief. The town of Lantana is home to many varieties of tropical vegetation, which can be seen in its variety of plants, trees, and flowers all over South Florida and the town itself, including its namesake, the lantana flower.

Climate data for Lantana, Florida
Month	Jan	Feb	Mar	Apr	May	Jun	Jul	Aug	Sep	Oct	Nov	Dec	Year
Record high °F (°C)	89 (32)	90 (32)	95 (35)	99 (37)	99 (37)	100 (38)	101 (38)	99 (37)	97 (36)	95 (35)	92 (33)	90 (32)	101 (38)
Mean daily maximum °F (°C)	75 (24)	77 (25)	79 (26)	82 (28)	86 (30)	89 (32)	90 (32)	90 (32)	88 (31)	85 (29)	80 (27)	76 (24)	83 (28)
Mean daily minimum °F (°C)	57 (14)	59 (15)	62 (17)	66 (19)	71 (22)	74 (23)	76 (24)	76 (24)	75 (24)	72 (22)	66 (19)	60 (16)	68 (20)
Record low °F (°C)	26 (−3)	27 (−3)	26 (−3)	38 (3)	45 (7)	60 (16)	64 (18)	65 (18)	61 (16)	46 (8)	36 (2)	24 (−4)	24 (−4)
Average precipitation inches (mm)	3.13 (80)	2.94 (75)	4.59 (117)	3.66 (93)	4.51 (115)	8.30 (211)	5.76 (146)	7.95 (202)	8.35 (212)	5.13 (130)	4.75 (121)	3.38 (86)	62.45 (1,588)
Source: 'The Weather Channel

== Demographics ==
Historical population
Census	Pop.	Note	%±
1930	188		—
1940	234		24.5%
1950	773		230.3%
1960	5,021		549.5%
1970	7,126		41.9%
1980	8,048		12.9%
1990	8,392		4.3%
2000	9,437		12.5%
2010	10,423		10.4%
2020	11,504		10.4%
U.S. Decennial Census

Lantana is part of the Miami metropolitan area of South Florida.

=== 2020 census ===
As of the 2020 census, Lantana had a population of 11,504. The median age was 43.3 years. 18.3% of residents were under the age of 18 and 19.4% of residents were 65 years of age or older. For every 100 females there were 95.2 males, and for every 100 females age 18 and over there were 93.1 males age 18 and over.

100.0% of residents lived in urban areas, while 0.0% lived in rural areas.

There were 4,649 households in Lantana, of which 25.5% had children under the age of 18 living in them. Of all households, 34.4% were married-couple households, 24.4% were households with a male householder and no spouse or partner present, and 32.3% were households with a female householder and no spouse or partner present. About 36.2% of all households were made up of individuals and 15.5% had someone living alone who was 65 years of age or older.

There were 5,659 housing units, of which 17.8% were vacant. The homeowner vacancy rate was 2.6% and the rental vacancy rate was 16.8%.

As of the 2020 census, 2,556 families resided in the town.

Lantana racial composition (Hispanics excluded from racial categories) (NH = Non-Hispanic)
Race	Number	Percentage
White (NH)	5,701	49.56%
Black or African American (NH)	2,755	23.95%
Native American or Alaska Native (NH)	18	0.16%
Asian (NH)	192	1.67%
Pacific Islander or Native Hawaiian (NH)	6	0.05%
Some other race (NH)	95	0.83%
Multiracial (NH)	377	3.28%
Hispanic or Latino (any race)	2,360	20.51%
Total	11,504	

=== 2010 census ===
Lantana Demographics
2010 Census	Lantana	Palm Beach County	Florida
Total population	10,423	1,320,134	18,801,310
Population change, 2000 to 2010	+10.4%	+16.7%	+17.6%
Population density	4,547.8/sq mi	670.2/sq mi	350.6/sq mi
White or Caucasian (incl. White Hispanic)	69.3%	73.5%	75.0%
(Non-Hispanic White or Caucasian)	56.3%	60.1%	57.9%
Black or African-American	22.0%	17.3%	16.0%
Hispanic or Latino (of any race)	18.6%	19.0%	22.5%
Asian	1.5%	2.4%	2.4%
Native American or Native Alaskan	0.4%	0.5%	0.4%
Pacific Islander or Native Hawaiian	0.1%	0.1%	0.1%
Multiracial	2.8%	2.3%	2.5%
Some other race	1.9%	3.9%	3.6%

As of the 2010 United States census, 10,423 people, 4,164 households, and 2,128 families were residing in the town.

=== 2000 census ===
In 2000, the age distribution included 6.1% under 5, 21.4% under 18, and 13.8% were 65 years or older. The median income for a household in the town was $41,624. About 17.4% of the population was below the poverty line.

As of 2000, English as a first language accounted for 73.24% of all residents, and Spanish was found to be the first language of 13.95%, French Creole made up 6.82%, and Finnish was spoken by 5.01% of the population (the highest percentage in Florida). Also, French was spoken by 0.62% of residents and German was spoken by 0.34% of the populace.

As of 2000, Lantana had the 111th-highest percentage of Finns in the US, which accounted for 5.4% of all residents (tied with two US areas in Michigan), and |Haitians had the 35th highest percentage, with 5.20% of the population.

== Culture ==
Lantana was the publishing headquarters of the National Enquirer during the 1970s and much of the 1980s.

The Town of Lantana has a public library, with a collection of more than 24,000 volumes, as of 2020. The Lantana Road Library west of the city in unincorporated Palm Beach County is a branch of the public Palm Beach County Library System.

== Education ==
Public

- Lantana Elementary School
- Starlight Cove Elementary School
- Barton Elementary School
- Lantana Community Middle School
- Santaluces Community High School

Public Charter School

- Palm Beach Maritime Academy (prekindergarten - grade 12)

Special Needs School

- Royal Palm School (prekindergarten - grade 12)

== Sister cities ==
- Lapua, Finland

== Notable people ==
- Artine Artinian, literature scholar
- Lori Berman, member of the Florida State Senate
- James Anthony Frederick, serial killer
- Clifford L. Linedecker, author
- Henry Augustus Pilsbry (1862–1957), malacologist and carcinologist
- Kathleen Ridder, philanthropist, educator, writer, equality for women activist
- Paul Shannon, radio announcer
