= Boca West, Florida =

Unincorporated community in Florida

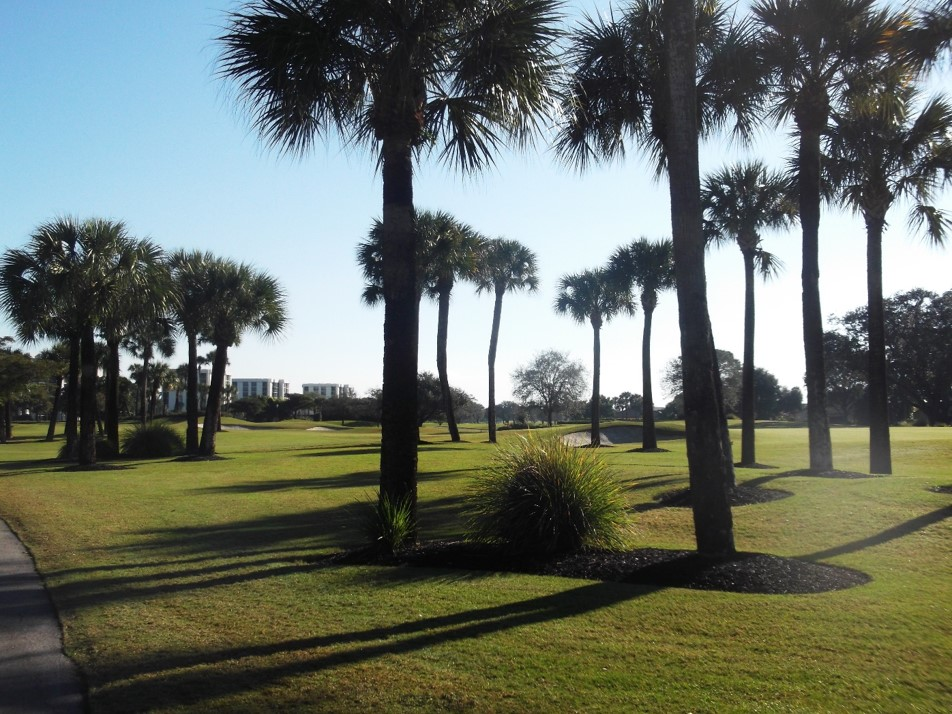
A golf course in Boca West – golf is a main theme of the community

Boca West is a development in West Boca Raton, Florida. It is an unincorporated community in Palm Beach County, Florida, United States. Boca West was a census-designated place in the 1990 United States census; its population was then 2,847.

== Boca West Golf Club ==
Logo of the Boca West Country Club

There are 72 holes at this golf facility. The golf course is divided into 4 courses, each with 18 holes. The clubhouse is located at Boca West Drive, the main, 4-lane thoroughfare through Boca West. The courses have recently undergone a massive, multimillion-dollar renovation and pro golfers have been seen around the courses playing and practicing.

== Geography ==
Boca West is located at 26°22′32″N 80°09′24″W.

It borders Boca Raton on the north and east, as well as Yamato and Jog Roads. On the south is State Road 808, and on the west is the Florida's Turnpike and Hamptons at Boca Raton.
