= West Boca Raton, Florida =

Unincorporated community west of Boca Raton, Florida

West Boca Raton, also known as West Boca, is an unincorporated community west of the city of Boca Raton, Florida. It is populated by numerous developments such as Boca Landings, The Hamptons, Mission Bay, Sandalfoot Cove, Century Village, Boca Greens and Loggers' Run.

== Geography ==
West Boca Raton is roughly considered to be the area west of the Florida's Turnpike between Delray Beach and the Broward County line. Some would also include the area between the Turnpike and Jog/Powerline Road or Military Trail, including Boca West, Boca Del Mar, and Boca Pointe, though large parts of that section have been annexed into municipal Boca Raton or are destined as "future annexation areas" per the Palm Beach County Planning Division.

Major north-south roads in West Boca include (from east to west) the Turnpike, Lyons Road, and U.S. Route 441/State Road 7. Major east-west roads include (from north to south) Clint Moore Road, Yamato Road (NW 51st St.), Glades Road, Palmetto Park Road, and SW 18th Street.

== Schools ==
=== Public schools ===
Elementary Schools

- Coral Sunset
- Hammock Pointe
- Sandpiper Shores
- Sunrise Park
- Water's Edge
- Whispering Pines

Middle Schools

- Eagles Landing
- Loggers' Run Community Middle School

High Schools

- West Boca Raton Community High School
- Olympic Heights Community High School

=== Private schools ===
A number of prominent Jewish day schools are located in Boca Raton, notably Donna Klein Jewish Academy, Katz Hillel Day School, and Katz Yeshiva High School, which are all on the campus of the Jewish Federation of South Palm Beach County.

Boca Prep International School is also in West Boca. The school offers the IB Diploma Programme.

== Culture and attractions ==
West Boca is home to the South County Regional Park, featuring the Coconut Cove Waterpark, the Daggerwing Nature Center, the Osprey Point Golf Course, the Sunset Cove Amphitheater, and various athletic fields, like Loggers' Run Park, for example. There is also a West Boca news company and Facebook page.

The Evert Tennis Academy, a tennis training center for developing collegiate and professional tennis players, is located in Mission Bay, a development in West Boca Raton. The academy was founded by professional tennis player Chris Evert and her brother John Evert.

== Libraries ==
The Palm Beach County Library System has two branches in West Boca, the West Boca Branch and Glades Road Branch. Both branches serve a large number of children's material, nonfiction, and adult fiction.

== See also ==
- Boca West, Florida
