= Mission Bay =

Mission Bay may refer to:

== Places ==
=== Australia ===
- The former name of Minjilang, Northern Territory

=== New Zealand ===
- Mission Bay, New Zealand, a suburb of Auckland

=== United States ===
- Mission Bay (San Diego), a bay within Mission Bay Park
- Mission Bay, San Francisco, a neighborhood
- Mission Bay (San Francisco), a former bay that was filled in to create the Mission Bay neighborhood
- Mission Bay, Florida, a census-designated place located in Palm Beach County
- Mission Bay (Texas), a bay that feeds into Copano Bay

== Military ==
- USS Mission Bay (CVE-59), a World War II aircraft carrier of the United States Navy
- Mission bay, a compartment which can be reconfigured to hold different mission-specific packages, as in the United States Navy's Littoral combat ship

== Other ==
- Mission Bay, a release candidate for version 1.0 of the Mozilla Firefox web browser
