= Palm Beach County, Florida =

County in Florida, United States

Palm Beach County
- County
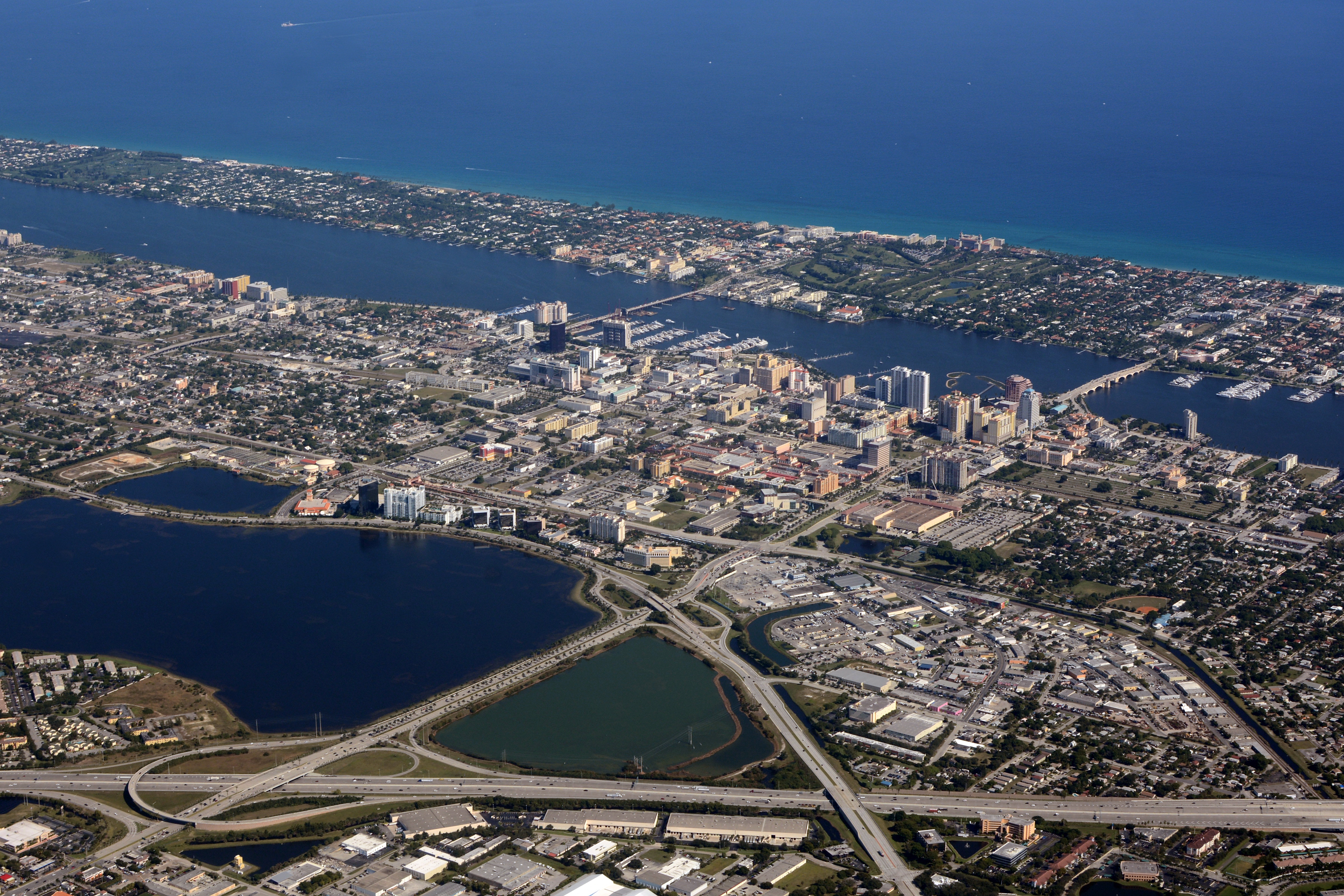
- West Palm Beach (foreground and center) and Palm Beach (background)

- Flag Seal

- Location within the United States
- Coordinates: 26°43′N 80°03′W
- Founded: April 30, 1909
- County seat: West Palm Beach
- Largest city: West Palm Beach

Area
  - County: 6,170 km^{2} (2,383 sq mi)
  - Land: 5,100 km^{2} (1,970 sq mi)
  - Water: 1,070 km^{2} (413 sq mi) 17.3%
  - Urban: 1,050 km^{2} (405 sq mi)

Population (2020)
  - County: 1,492,191
  - Estimate (2025): 1,575,726 ▲
  - Rank: 26th in the United States; 3rd in Florida
  - Density: 292/km^{2} (757/sq mi)
  - Urban density: 1,420/km^{2} (3,678/sq mi)

GDP
  - Total: $131.097 billion (2023)
- Time zone: UTC−5 (Eastern Time Zone)
  - Summer (DST): UTC−4 (Eastern Daylight Time)
- Congressional District: 20th, 21st, 22nd, 23rd
- Website: https://discover.pbcgov.org/

Palm Beach County is located in the southeastern part of Florida, in the Miami metropolitan area. It is Florida's third-most populous county after Miami-Dade County and Broward County and the 24th-most populous in the United States, with 1,492,191 residents as of the 2020 census. Its county seat and largest city is West Palm Beach, which had a population of 117,415 as of 2020. Named after one of its oldest settlements, Palm Beach, the county was established in 1909, after being split from Miami-Dade County. The county's modern-day boundaries were established in 1963.

Palm Beach County is one of the three counties that make up the Miami metropolitan area, which was home to 6.14 million people in 2020. The area has been increasing in population since the late 19th century, with the incorporation of West Palm Beach in 1894 and after Henry Flagler extended the Florida East Coast Railway and built the Royal Poinciana Hotel, The Breakers, and Whitehall. In 1928, the Okeechobee hurricane struck Palm Beach County and caused thousands of deaths. More recently, the county acquired national attention during the 2000 presidential election, when a controversial recount occurred.

In 2004, Palm Beach County was Florida's wealthiest county, with a per capita personal income of $44,518. It leads the state in agricultural productivity; agriculture is Palm Beach County's second-largest industry, after real estate development. In undeveloped (central and western) Palm Beach County there is significant tropical agricultural production, especially nurseries, truck crops (vegetables), and sugar cane. Palm Beach County has been called the "Winter Vegetable Capital" of the nation.

== History ==
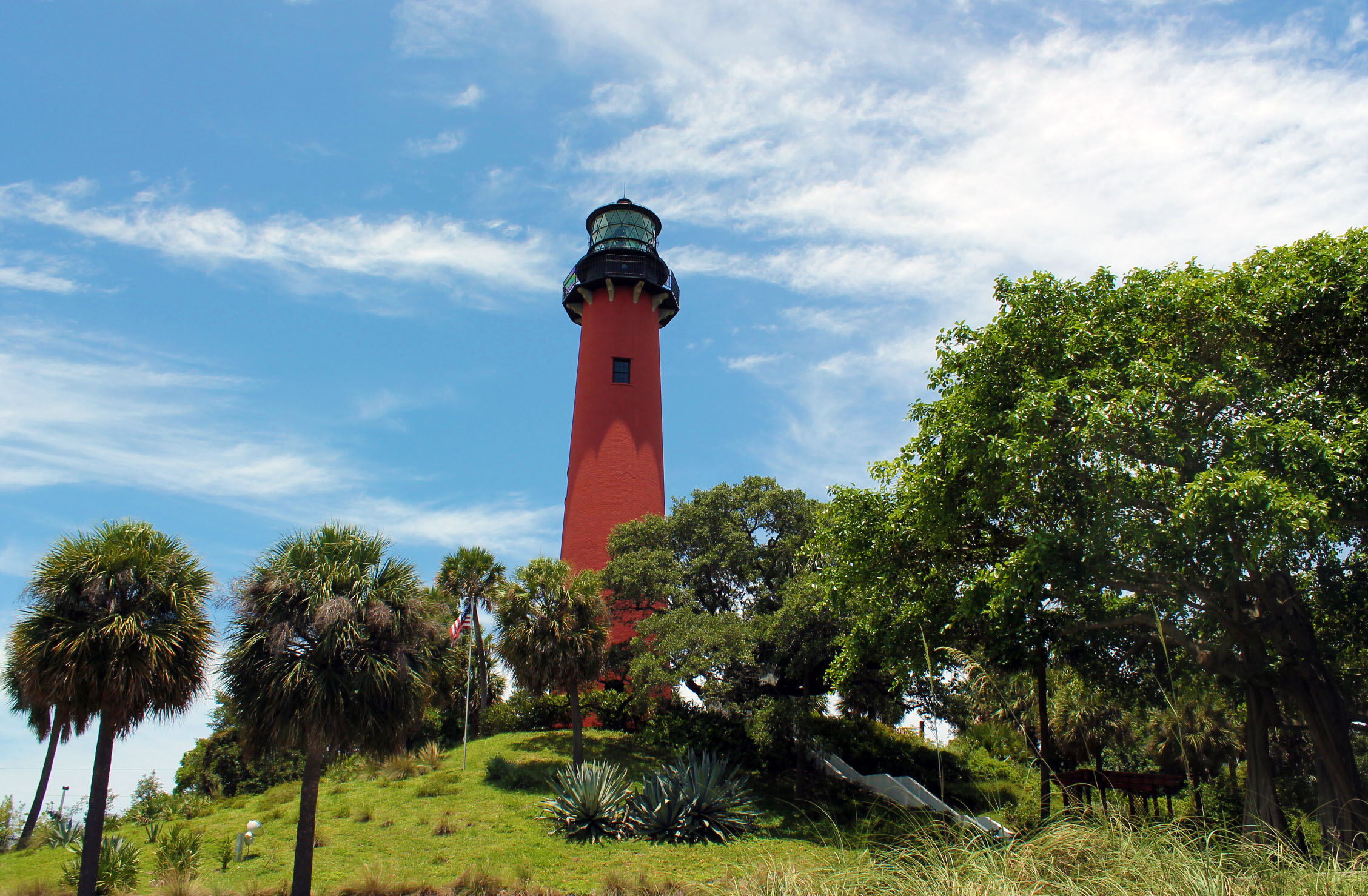
Jupiter Lighthouse situated in the Jupiter Inlet Lighthouse Outstanding Natural Area

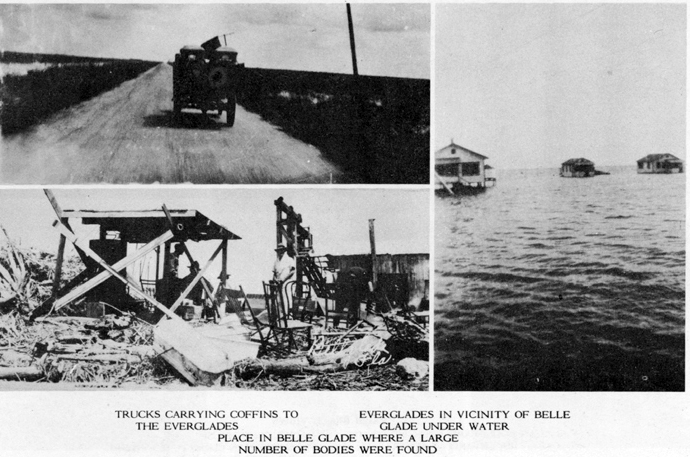
A montage of images of impact by the 1928 Okeechobee hurricane

Around 12,000 years ago, Native Americans began migrating into Florida. An estimated 20,000 Native Americans lived in South Florida when the Spanish arrived. Their population diminished significantly by the 18th century, due to warfare, enslavement, and diseases from Europe. In 1513, Juan Ponce de León became the first European in modern-day Palm Beach County when he landed at the Jupiter Inlet. Among the first non-Native American residents were African Americans, many of whom were former slaves or immediate descendants of former slaves, arriving in what was then Spanish Florida in the late 17th century. Finding refuge among the Seminoles, the former slaves or descendants of former slaves fought alongside them against white settlers and bounty hunters during the Seminole Wars. Portions of the Second Seminole War occurred in Palm Beach County, including the Battles of the Loxahatchee in 1838.

The county's oldest surviving structure, the Jupiter Lighthouse, was built in 1860, after receiving authorization to the land from President Franklin Pierce in 1854. During the American Civil War, Florida was a member of the Confederate States of America. Two Confederate adherents removed the lighting mechanism from the lighthouse. One of the men who removed the light, Augustus O. Lang, was also the first white settler in Palm Beach County. He built a palmetto shack along the eastern shore of Lake Worth in 1863 after abandoning the cause of the Confederacy. After the Civil War ended, the Jupiter Lighthouse was relit in 1866.

In October 1873, a hurricane caused a shipwreck between Biscayne Bay and the New River. The crew survived the wreck but nearly died due to starvation because of the desolation of the area. In response, five Houses of Refuge were built along the east coast of Florida from the Fort Pierce Inlet southward to Biscayne Bay. Orange Grove House of Refuge No. 3 was built near Delray Beach in 1876.

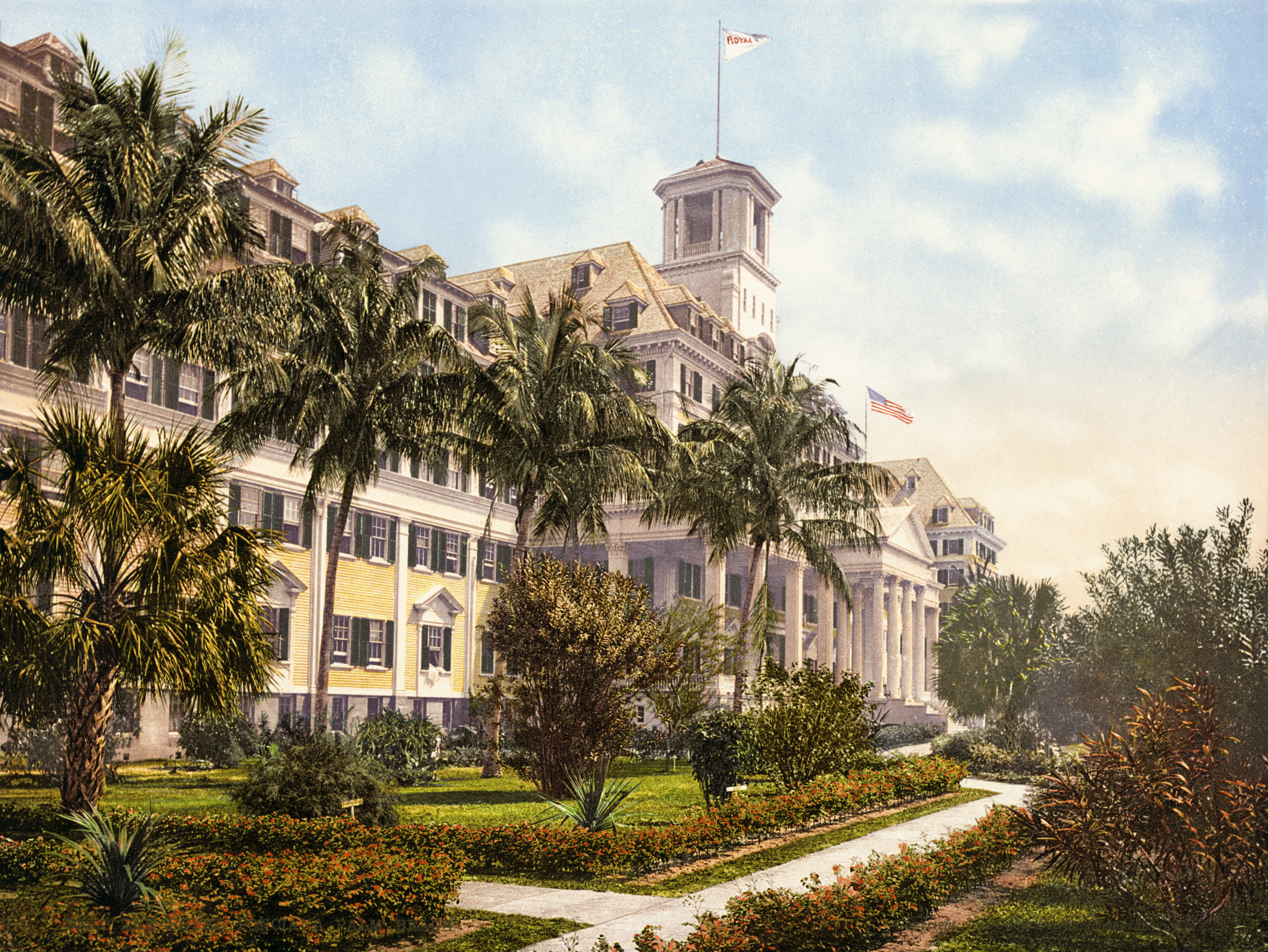
The Royal Poinciana Hotel in 1900

Very few people lived in modern-day Palm Beach County prior to the arrival of Henry Flagler, who first visited in the early 1890s. A Standard Oil tycoon, Flagler was instrumental in the county's development around the turn of the century. First, he purchased land on both sides of Lake Worth. Other investors followed suit, causing a small boom and bringing in existing businesses and resulting in the establishment of many new businesses. The Royal Poinciana Hotel, constructed by Flagler and his constructed crews to accommodate wealthy tourists, opened for business in February 1894. About a month later, the Florida East Coast Railway, owned by Flagler, reached West Palm Beach. On November 5, 1894, Palm Beach County's oldest city, West Palm Beach, was incorporated. In 1896, another hotel built by Flagler was opened, the Palm Beach Inn, later renamed The Breakers. He also constructed his own winter home, which he and his wife moved into in 1902. The arrivals of Major Nathan Boynton, Congressman William S. Linton, and railroad surveyor Thomas Rickards in the 1890s also proved important because they developed communities that later became Boynton Beach, Delray Beach, and Boca Raton, respectively.

The Florida Legislature voted to establish Palm Beach County in 1909, carving it out of what was then the northern portion of Dade County and initially including all of Lake Okeechobee. The southernmost part of Palm Beach County was separated to create the northern portion of Broward County in 1915, the northwestern portion became part of Okeechobee County in 1917, and southern Martin County was created from northernmost Palm Beach County in 1925. The boundaries remained the same until 1963, when the Florida Legislature reduced Palm Beach County's share of Lake Okeechobee from about 80 percent to less than 40 percent and divided the lake more equitably among Glades, Hendry, Martin, and Okeechobee counties. A final change to the county's boundaries occurred in 2009, when a small portion of land was given to Broward County.

The 1910s and much of the 1920s brought prosperity and rapid population growth to South Florida, coinciding with the Florida land boom of the 1920s. Many local historic districts and landmarks listed in the National Register of Historic Places in Palm Beach County were designed and constructed during the 1920s, with the main contributors being architects Maurice Fatio, Addison Mizner, Marion Sims Wyeth, and the firm Harvey and Clarke, which included Gustav Maass. Total property value in West Palm Beach skyrocketed from $13.6 million in 1920 to $61 million in 1925, before briefly reaching a pre-Great Depression peak of $89 million in 1929. The city's population quadrupled between 1920 and 1927.

Early on September 17, 1928, the Okeechobee hurricane made landfall near West Palm Beach as a category-4 storm and crossed Lake Okeechobee shortly thereafter. While the hurricane caused catastrophic impact in eastern portions of the county, the Lake Okeechobee region suffered a much heavier loss of life. Wind-driven storm surge in the lake inundated hundreds of square miles, including the nearby communities of Belle Glade, Pahokee, and South Bay. At least 2,500 deaths occurred, many of whom were black migrant farmers. An assessment of impact throughout the county reported 552 businesses destroyed, 1,447 businesses damaged, 3,584 homes destroyed, and 11,409 homes damaged, leaving 4,008 families homeless. However, several cities were excluded, such as Boca Raton, Greenacres, Lantana, and South Palm Beach. Damage in South Florida totaled roughly $25 million. In response to the storm, the Herbert Hoover Dike was constructed to prevent a similar disaster.

As a result of 1926 Miami hurricane and the 1928 storm, Palm Beach County, along with the rest of South Florida, began suffering economic turmoil and pushed the region into the Great Depression, even before the Wall Street Crash of 1929. Housing prices dropped dramatically in the county, with the total real estate value in West Palm Beach falling to $41.6 million in 1930 and then to $18.2 million in 1935. However, the decade also brought an airport to the county. Morrison Field, later renamed the Palm Beach International Airport, opened in 1936.

After the U.S. entered World War II, it was converted to an Air Force Base in 1942. During the war, thousands of servicemen arrived in Palm Beach County for training and supporting the war effort. Following the conclusion of World War II, a number of veterans returned to the area for work, vacation, or retirement. The base was closed and became a commercial airport again in 1962. Migration to the county by workers, tourists, and retirees continued into the 21st century.

On August 28, 1949, a category-4 hurricane struck Lake Worth Beach with maximum sustained winds of 130 mph (215 km/h), causing considerable damage. Throughout Palm Beach County, the hurricane destroyed 65 homes and damaged 13,283 others.

The area's first television station, WIRK-TV Channel 21, began broadcasting on September 13, 1953. It went off the air less than three years later. However, NBC affiliate WPTV-TV and CBS affiliate WPEC first aired in 1954 and 1955, respectively – both of which are still in existence today.

Richard Paul Pavlick nearly attempted to assassinate then President-elect John F. Kennedy while the family vacationed in Palm Beach in December 1960. On December 11, Pavlick forwent his attempt because Kennedy was with his wife, Jacqueline, and their two children. Four days later, Pavlick's car, which had sticks of dynamite inside, was surrounded by police and he was arrested. Charges against Pavlick were dropped on December 2, 1963, 10 days after Kennedy was assassinated in Dallas, Texas. Additionally, a secret blast shelter was built on Peanut Island during his presidency because escalating Cold War tensions.

Hurricane David struck near West Palm Beach late on September 3, 1979, with sustained winds of 100 mph (155 km/h). The storm's winds shattered windows in stores near the coast and caused property damage. A few roofs were torn off, and numerous buildings were flooded from over 6 in (150 mm) of rainfall. Damage in the county reached $30 million, most of which was incurred to agriculture.

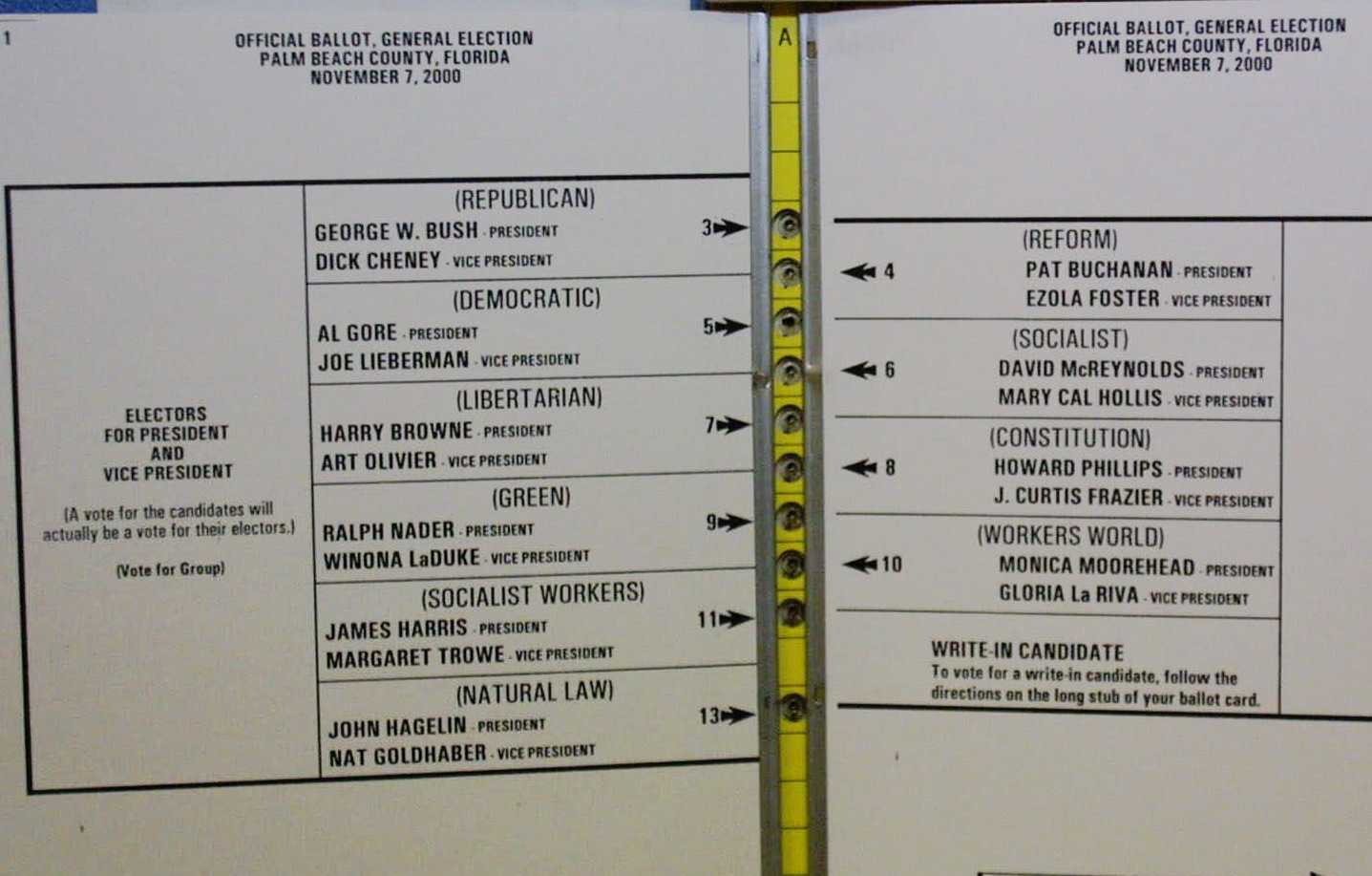
The "butterfly ballot" used during the 2000 election in Palm Beach County

The county became the center of controversy during the 2000 presidential election. Allegedly, the "butterfly ballot", designed by Palm Beach County Supervisor of Elections Theresa LePore, led to an unexpectedly large number of votes for Reform Party candidate Pat Buchanan, rather than for Democrat Al Gore. Due to the aforementioned "butterfly ballot" and the closeness of the statewide results between Gore and Texas Governor George W. Bush, the Florida Supreme Court mandated manual recounts in all counties with disputed results. However, the Supreme Court of the United States overturned the decision in Bush v. Gore on December 12, allowing Florida Secretary of the State Katherine Harris to award the 25 electoral votes to Bush, as Harris's tally prior to the state-ordered recounts placed him ahead of Gore by 537 popular votes. In turn, this gave Bush victory in the national election.

Following the September 11 attacks in 2001, a Federal Bureau of Investigation investigation revealed that 12 of the 19 hijackers trained or resided in Palm Beach County during the months prior to the attacks. Later that month, during the anthrax attacks, a letter containing spores of this substance was mailed to the American Media, Inc. building in Boca Raton. Three people were exposed to the anthrax, including Robert Stevens, a photo editor who later died after an infection induced by exposure.

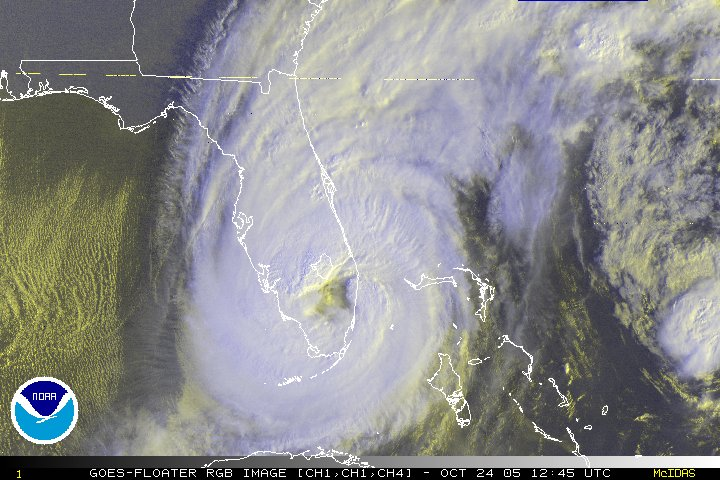
Hurricane Wilma over South Florida on October 24, 2005

Three hurricanes severely impacted Palm Beach County in 2004 and 2005: Frances, Jeanne, and Wilma. On September 5, 2004, Frances made landfall in Martin County as a category-2 hurricane. With wind gusts in Palm Beach County peaking at 91 mph (146 km/h), the storm inflicted structural damage on about 15,000 houses and 2,400 businesses. Six deaths occurred in the county. Jeanne struck near the same location as a category-3 hurricane on September 26, 2004. The storm also brought strong winds, with an official wind gust of 94 mph (151 km/h). About 4,160 homes were damaged and 60 were destroyed. Jeanne left about $260 million in damage in the county. On October 24, 2005, Hurricane Wilma struck Collier County as a category-3 hurricane. The storm moved northeastward, directly crossing Palm Beach County. Several locations reported hurricane-force winds, including a wind gust of 117 mph (188 km/h) in Belle Glade. Over 90% of Florida Power & Light customers lost electricity. Two deaths occurred in Palm Beach County. The storm inflicted some degree of impact to more than 55,000 homes and 3,600 businesses. Palm Beach County suffered about $2.9 billion in damages.

In August 2012, the outer bands of Hurricane Isaac dropped at least 15.86 in (403 mm) of rain near Lion Country Safari. The consequent flooding left neighborhoods in The Acreage, Loxahatchee, Loxahatchee Groves, Royal Palm Beach, and Wellington stranded for up to several days. As Hurricane Irma approached in September 2017, mandatory or voluntary evacuations were ordered for more than 290,000 residents of Palm Beach County. Although the storm passed well west of the county, much of the area experienced hurricane-force wind gusts, with a peak gust of 91 mph (146 km/h) in West Palm Beach. Impact was generally limited to widespread power outages and damaged trees and vegetation, though isolated property damage was reported. The storm left about $300 million in damage in the county, as well as five fatalities.

=== Toponymy ===
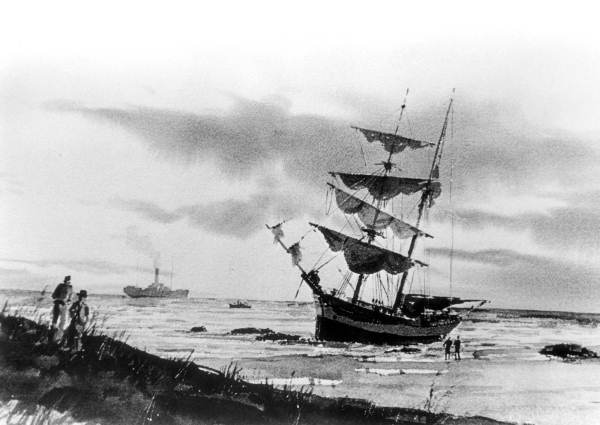
The ship Providencia, wrecked off the coast of Florida, in 1878

The coconut palm, Cocos nucifera, is not native to Florida (nor anywhere else in the United States). Its presence in what is today Palm Beach County is due to the shipwreck of the Spanish ship Providencia in 1878, near today's Mar-a-Lago. It was traveling from Havana to Cádiz, Spain, with a cargo of coconuts. The shipwreck was within walking distance of the shore—the Florida State Archives conserves a picture of a painting—and a deliberate grounding so as to obtain an insurance payout has been proposed. The coconuts were salvaged, too many to be eaten, and thousands were planted. A lush grove of palm trees soon grew on what was later named Palm Beach.

== Geography ==
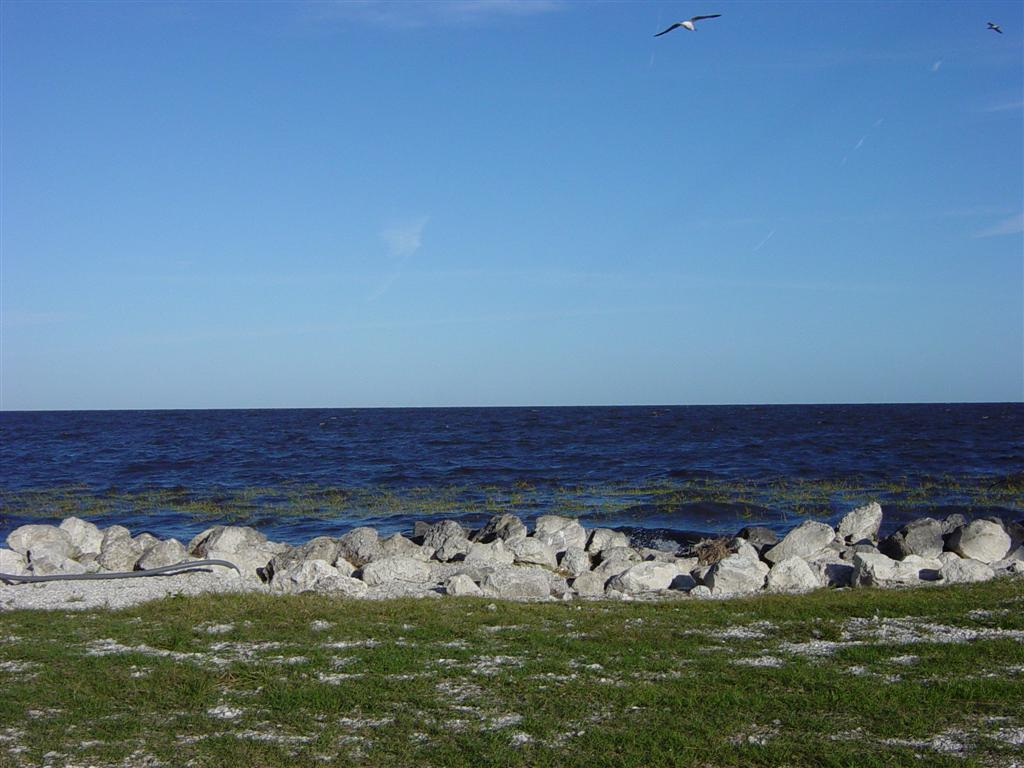
View of Lake Okeechobee from Pahokee

Palm Beach, FL

Climate chart (precipitation, max. and min. temperature)
J	F	M	A	M	J	J	A	S	O	N	D
2.4 75 56	2.4 77 57	3.8 79 59	2.5 83 62	4 88 67	8 90 72	6.7 91 73	7.4 91 73	7.4 90 72	4.3 86 69	3.2 81 62	2.2 76 57
- █ Average max. and min. temperatures in °F
- █ Precipitation totals in inches
Metric conversion
J	F	M	A	M	J	J	A	S	O	N	D
61 24 14	61 25 14	97 26 15	64 29 17	102 31 19	203 32 22	170 33 23	188 33 23	188 32 22	109 30 20	81 27 17	56 24 14
- █ Average max. and min. temperatures in °C
- █ Precipitation totals in mm

According to the U.S. Census Bureau, the county has a total area of 2,383 square miles (6,170 km^{2}), of which 1,970 square miles (5,100 km^{2}) are land and 413 square miles (1,070 km^{2}) (17.3%) are covered by water. It is the second-largest county in Florida by land area and third-largest by total area. Much of the water is the Atlantic Ocean and Lake Okeechobee. The county has an estimated 526,000 acres (213,000 ha) of farmland.

The eastern third of Palm Beach County is highly urbanized, while the central and western portions of the county are suburban or rural. Palm Beach County is one of three counties in the Miami metropolitan area. However, the county's western communities along Lake Okeechobee, such as Belle Glade, South Bay, and Pahokee, have also been considered more part of the rural Florida Heartland.

The Atlantic coastline of Palm Beach County is about 47 mi (76 km) in length. It consists mainly of barrier islands and peninsulas, including Jupiter Island, Singer Island, and Palm Beach Island. These islands are separated from the mainland by the Intracoastal Waterway, with much of the waterway locally known as the Lake Worth Lagoon. The main barrier landmasses are split by four inlets: the Jupiter Inlet, the Lake Worth Inlet, the South Lake Worth Inlet, and the Boca Raton Inlet. Two of the four inlets are natural, but significantly altered – the Jupiter and Boca Raton inlets – while the Lake Worth and South Lake Worth inlets are man-made, with the former dug in the 1890s and the latter created between 1926 and 1927. Several other islands exist within the Intracoastal Waterway, including Hypoluxo Island, Munyon Island, and Peanut Island.

=== Adjacent counties ===
- Martin County – north
- Broward County – south
- Hendry County – west
- Glades County – northwest
- Okeechobee County- Northwest via 5 way county intersection in the middle of Lake Okeechobee

=== Natural areas ===
- Arthur R. Marshall Loxahatchee National Wildlife Refuge, a 147,392-acre (59,647 ha) refuge in Boynton Beach
- DuPuis Management Area, a 21,875-acre (8,852 ha) area of protected lands
- John D. MacArthur Beach State Park, a 348-acre (141 ha) park in North Palm Beach, Florida
- J.W. Corbett Wildlife Management Area, a 60,348-acre (24,422 ha) area of protected lands
- Jupiter Ridge Natural Area, a 271-acre (110 ha) preserve in Jupiter, Florida
- Juno Dunes Natural Area, a 576-acre (233 ha) preserve in Juno Beach
- Frenchman's Forest Natural Area, a 158-acre (64 ha) preserve in Palm Beach Gardens
- Pawpaw Preserve
- Sweetbay Natural Area, a 1,094-acre (443 ha) preserve in Palm Beach Gardens
- Royal Palm Beach Pines Natural Area, a 773 acres (313 ha) preserve in Royal Palm Beach.
- Hypoluxo Scrub Natural Area, a 97-acre (39 ha) preserve in Hypoluxo
- Rosemary Scrub Natural Area, a 14-acre (5.7 ha) preserve in Boynton Beach
- Seacrest Scrub Natural Area, a 54-acre (22 ha) preserve in Boynton Beach
- Delray Oaks Natural Area a 25-acre (10 ha) prairie and xeric hammock preserve with a small strand swamp and areas of flatwoods in Delray Beach
- Leon M. Weekes Environmental Preserve, a 12-acre (4.9 ha) preserve in Delray Beach
- Grassy Waters Everglades Preserve, a 14,720-acre (5,960 ha) wetland in West Palm Beach, Florida

In addition, the county has an abundance of coral reef patches along its coastline and has made efforts to preserve them.

== Demographics ==
Historical population
Census	Pop.	Note	%±
1910	5,577		—
1920	18,654		234.5%
1930	51,781		177.6%
1940	79,989		54.5%
1950	114,688		43.4%
1960	228,106		98.9%
1970	348,993		53.0%
1980	576,863		65.3%
1990	863,518		49.7%
2000	1,131,184		31.0%
2010	1,320,134		16.7%
2020	1,492,191		13.0%
2025 (est.)	1,575,726	▲	5.6%
U.S. Decennial Census; 1910–1970 1980 1990; 2000 2010 2020 2022

=== 2020 census ===
As of the 2020 census, the county had a population of 1,492,191. The median age was 45.3 years. 19.0% of residents were under the age of 18 and 24.3% of residents were 65 years of age or older. For every 100 females there were 92.3 males, and for every 100 females age 18 and over there were 89.7 males age 18 and over.

The racial makeup of the county was 57.3% White, 17.6% Black or African American, 0.6% American Indian and Alaska Native, 3.0% Asian, <0.1% Native Hawaiian and Pacific Islander, 7.5% from some other race, and 14.0% from two or more races. Hispanic or Latino residents of any race comprised 23.5% of the population.

99.2% of residents lived in urban areas, while 0.8% lived in rural areas.

There were 607,880 households in the county, of which 25.9% had children under the age of 18 living in them. Of all households, 45.0% were married-couple households, 18.0% were households with a male householder and no spouse or partner present, and 30.3% were households with a female householder and no spouse or partner present. About 29.9% of all households were made up of individuals and 15.7% had someone living alone who was 65 years of age or older.

There were 705,988 housing units, of which 13.9% were vacant. Among occupied housing units, 67.4% were owner-occupied and 32.6% were renter-occupied. The homeowner vacancy rate was 2.0% and the rental vacancy rate was 8.3%.

=== Racial and ethnic composition ===
Historical racial composition	2020	2010	2000	1990	1980
White (non-Hispanic)	52.3%	60.1%	70.6%	79.1%	80.9%
Hispanic or Latino	23.5%	19.0%	12.4%	7.7%	4.9%
Black or African American (non-Hispanic)	17.1%	16.8%	13.5%	12.0%	13.2%
Asian American (non-Hispanic)	2.9%	2.4%	1.5%	1.0%	0.9%
Native American (non-Hispanic)	0.1%	0.2%	0.1%	0.1%	0.9%
Other Race (non-Hispanic)	0.7%	0.3%	0.2%	0.1%	0.9%
Two or more races (non-Hispanic)	3.4%	1.3%	1.6%	N/A	N/A
Population	1,492,191	1,320,134	1,131,184	863,518	576,863

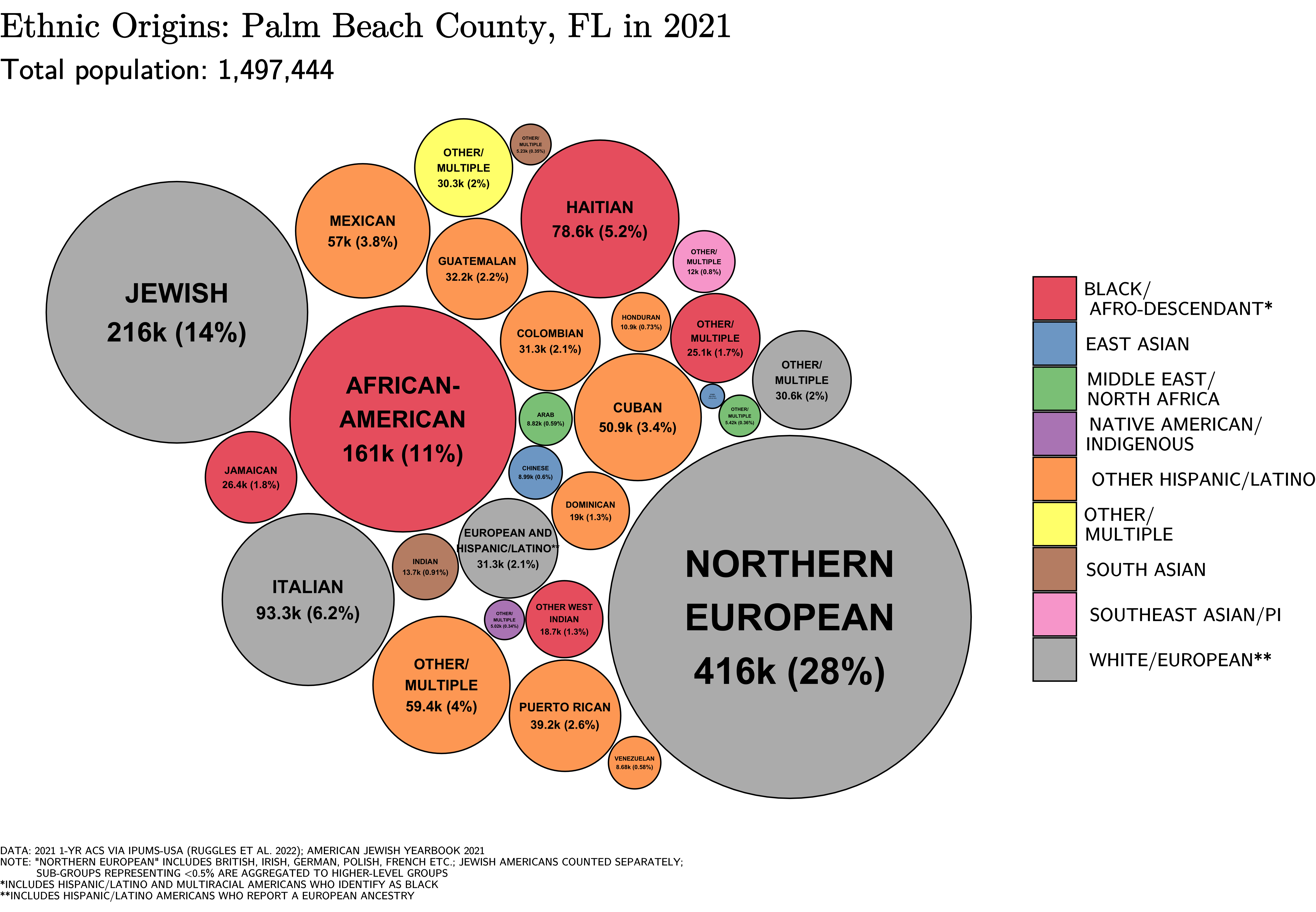
Ethnic origins in Palm Beach County

Demographic characteristics	2020	2010	2000	1990	1980
Households	705,988	664,594	556,428	365,558	234,339
Persons per household	2.11	1.99	2.03	2.36	2.46
Sex Ratio	92.3	93.8	93.5	92.3	91.1
Ages 0–17	19.0%	20.4%	21.3%	19.6%	21.3%
Ages 18–64	56.7%	58.0%	55.6%	56.1%	55.4%
Ages 65 +	24.3%	21.6%	23.2%	24.3%	23.3%
Median age	45.3	43.5	41.8	39.8	39.7
Population	1,492,191	1,320,134	1,131,184	863,518	576,863

Economic indicators
2017–21 American Community Survey	Palm Beach County	Florida
Median income	$36,431	$34,367
Median household income	$68,874	$61,777
Poverty Rate	11.6%	13.1%
High school diploma	89.1%	89.0%
Bachelor's degree	38.0%	31.5%
Advanced degree	15.0%	11.7%

Language spoken at home (Note: Language spoken at home among residents at least five years old; only languages (or language groups) which at least 2% of residents have spoken at any time since 1980 are mentioned)	2015 (Note: Refers to 2013–2017 American Community Survey data; the last Decennial Census where language data was collected was in the 2000 census)	2010 (Note: Refers to 2008–2012 American Community Survey data; the last Decennial Census where language data was collected was in the 2000 census)	2000	1990	1980
English only	68.9%	72.1%	78.3%	84.7%	84.9%
Spanish or Spanish Creole	18.4%	16.5%	11.9%	7.2%	4.3%
French or Haitian Creole	6.3%	5.5%	4.0%	2.4%	1.0%
Other Languages	6.4%	5.9%	5.8%	5.7%	9.8%

Nativity	2015 (Note: Refers to 2013–2017 American Community Survey data; the last Decennial Census where foreign-born population data was collected was in the 2000 census)	2010 (Note: Refers to 2008–2012 American Community Survey data; the last Decennial Census where foreign-born population data was collected was in the 2000 census)	2000	1990	1980
% population native-born	75.4%	77.6%	82.6%	87.8%	89.9%
... born in the United States	72.8%	75.5%	80.5%	86.2%	88.9%
... born in Puerto Rico or Island Areas	1.4%	1.1%	1.3%	0.9%	1.0%
... born to American parents abroad	1.2%	1.0%	0.8%	0.8%	1.0%
% population foreign-born (Note: Only countries of birth which at least 0.5% of residents were born in at any time since 1980 are mentioned)	24.6%	22.4%	17.4%	12.2%	10.1%
... born in Haiti	4.2%	3.6%	2.5%	1.2%	N/A (Note: Not counted separately; aggregated into "Other" category)
... born in Cuba	2.4%	2.1%	1.7%	1.4%	1.4%
... born in Jamaica	1.8%	1.4%	1.0%	0.6%	0.3%
... born in Mexico	1.7%	1.8%	1.5%	0.7%	0.1%
... born in Colombia	1.5%	1.3%	0.9%	0.3%	N/A
... born in Guatemala	1.3%	1.3%	0.6%	0.1%	N/A
... born in Canada	0.8%	0.8%	0.9%	0.8%	1.0%
... born in Brazil	0.8%	0.6%	0.3%	0.1%	N/A
... born in Honduras	0.6%	0.5%	0.3%	0.1%	N/A
... born in the Dominican Republic	0.5%	0.5%	0.3%	0.1%	< 0.1%
... born in Peru	0.5%	0.6%	0.3%	0.1%	N/A
... born in the United Kingdom	0.5%	0.4%	0.6%	0.7%	0.8%
... born in Germany	0.4%	0.4%	0.6%	0.6%	0.7%
... born in Poland	0.2%	0.3%	0.4%	0.5%	0.5%
... born in Russia	0.2%	0.1%	0.2%	0.3% (Note: Data from the 1980 census and 1990 census pertains to residents born anywhere in the Soviet Union, not just Russia)	0.6%
... born in other countries	7.2%	6.7%	5.3%	4.6%	4.7%

== Economy ==
Companies headquartered in Palm Beach County include Office Depot, The ADT Corporation, TBC Corporation, G4S Secure Solutions, NextEra Energy, The GEO Group, American Sugar Refining, Carrier, Globalsat Group, and Bluegreen Vacations.

There are a significant number of aerospace facilities in the county, operated by United Technologies, Pratt & Whitney Rocketdyne, Sikorsky Aircraft, General Dynamics, Lockheed Martin, and B/E Aerospace. Many of these companies rank among the top 100 employers for the county. The largest employer in Palm Beach County is the School District of Palm Beach County, with 27,168 employees, including more than 12,800 teachers.

Previously W. R. Grace and Company had its headquarters in unincorporated Palm Beach County, near Boca Raton, employing about 130 staff. On January 27, 2011, it announced it was closing the Boca headquarters and moving its administrative staff out of state along with some employees. Likewise, A360 Media, LLC, publisher of the National Enquirer, was headquartered in Boca Raton, but moved New York in 2014.

For 2010, the median income for a household in the county was $53,242, and for a family was $64,445. Males had a median income of $44,324 versus $37,337 for females. The per capita income for the county was $33,610. About 8.6% of families and 12.2% of the population were below the poverty line, including 18.5% of those under age 18 and 7.7% of those aged 65 or over.

== Culture ==
=== Sports ===
The St. Louis Cardinals and the Miami Marlins of the Major League Baseball conduct their spring training at Roger Dean Stadium in Jupiter. Two teams in the Class A-Advanced Florida State League also play their home games at Roger Dean Stadium: the Jupiter Hammerheads, an affiliate of the Miami Marlins, and the Palm Beach Cardinals, an affiliate of the St. Louis Cardinals.

Prior to the construction of Roger Dean Stadium, the Montreal Expos and Atlanta Braves held their spring training at Municipal Stadium in West Palm Beach. The West Palm Beach Expos, a Single-A affiliate of the Montreal Expos, also played their games there.

The Ballpark of the Palm Beaches, opened in February 2017 in West Palm Beach, accommodates both the Washington Nationals and the Houston Astros for spring training.

Also popular are the Florida Atlantic Owls, an NCAA Division I school that participates in American Athletic Conference. The FAU football team plays at FAU Stadium, and averaged 17,941 fans during the 2017 season. The FAU basketball team plays at FAU Arena, and averaged 1,346 fans during the 2013–14 season.

USL Palm Beach is an upcoming American professional soccer team based in Palm Beach County. Founded in 2023, the team plans to make its debut in the USL Championship.

The Palm Beach Imperials are an American Basketball Association 2006 expansion franchise.

=== Tourism ===
Tourists can visit these attractions and annual events:

- South Florida Fair
- SunFest
- Boat Show
- Winter Equestrian Festival
- Lion Country Safari
- Rapids Water Park
- Kravis Center for the Performing Arts
- South Florida Science Museum
- Palm Beach Zoo at Dreher Park
- Palm Beach Shakespeare Festival
- Norton Museum of Art
- Flagler Museum
- Jupiter Inlet Lighthouse
- Worth Avenue
- Clematis Street Historic Commercial District
- CityPlace
- Peanut Island
- Society of the Four Arts
- Ann Norton Sculpture Gardens
- Mounts Botanical Garden
- Gumbo Limbo Environmental Complex
- Morikami Museum and Japanese Gardens, including the Roji-en Japanese Gardens
- Palm Beach Maritime Museum
- Sandoway Discovery Center
- Daggerwing Nature Center

A number of shopping malls exist throughout Palm Beach County, including the Palm Beach Outlets, CityPlace, Boynton Beach Mall, The Gardens Mall, Town Center at Boca Raton, The Mall at Wellington Green and Mizner Park. Formerly, the Palm Beach and Cross County Malls operated in the county, though they closed in 1997 and 2010, respectively.

=== Media ===
- The Palm Beach Post
- Palm Beach Daily News
- New Times Broward-Palm Beach
- Sun-Sentinel
- WPTV-TV
- WPBF-TV
- WFLX
- WPEC
- WTVX

== Government ==
The Florida Department of Corrections operates the Glades Correctional Institution in an unincorporated area in Palm Beach County near Belle Glade.

Palm Beach County's revenue from property taxes, sales taxes and tourist development taxes reached record levels in Fiscal Year (FY) 2018, according to the Clerk of the Circuit Court & Comptroller, Palm Beach County's annual financial report, Checks & Balances: Your Guide to County Finances.

The County collected $1.1 billion in property tax revenue in FY 2018, an increase of 6 percent over the previous year. Sales tax collections rose to $175.8 million, marking the eighth consecutive year of growth. Revenue from Tourist Development Tax receipts was $53.8 million, up from $48.5 million in FY 2017. Meanwhile, Local Option Gas Taxes paid by motorists for gasoline decreased for the first time in five years, partially due to higher gasoline prices, which reduced the number of miles driven, according to the Clerk of the Circuit Court & Comptroller's Checks & Balances report.

=== County government ===
The county is governed by a board of commissioners, consisting of seven commissioners, who are all elected from single-member districts. One of the commissioners is elected County Mayor and one of them is elected Vice Mayor. Commissioners serve staggered terms, and commissioners from Districts 1, 3, 5, and 7 are elected during presidential election years, while the commissioners from Districts 2, 4, and 6 are elected in gubernatorial election years.

Elected county officers include a clerk of courts and comptroller, sheriff, property appraiser, tax collector, and supervisor of elections. State officers serving the Florida judicial district include the state attorney and public defender. All positions are 4-year terms, requiring direct election by voters in presidential election years.

Five former county commissioners have been accused or found guilty of corruption from 2006 to 2009. A grand jury recommended a strong inspector general. This position was approved by county voters in 2010. A county judge found that the mandate covered municipal government in 2015.

=== Legal and Judicial System ===
Palm Beach County is part of Florida’s 15th Judicial Circuit, one of the 20 judicial circuits in the state. The circuit court has jurisdiction over civil disputes involving more than $30,000, felony criminal cases, probate and guardianship matters, juvenile dependency and delinquency, and appeals from county courts. It serves a population of over 1.5 million residents and operates out of multiple courthouse facilities, including the main Palm Beach County Courthouse located in downtown West Palm Beach.

The county court, also under the 15th Circuit, handles misdemeanor criminal cases, traffic infractions, civil disputes under $30,000, and landlord-tenant matters. As of 2026, the Chief Judge of the 15th Judicial Circuit is Glenn D. Kelley, who oversees administrative functions and judicial assignments.

==== Current County Officeholders ====
Palm Beach County elected officials
Board of County Commissioners
Position	Incumbent
District 1 Commissioner	Maria G. Marino
District 2 Commissioner	Erica Whitfield
District 3 Commissioner	Joel Flores
District 4 Commissioner	Marci Woodward
District 5 Commissioner	Vice Mayor Maria Sachs
District 6 Commissioner	Katherine Waldron
District 7 Commissioner	Bobby Powell, Jr.
County Administrator	Joseph Abruzzo
Constitutional Officers
Position	Incumbent
Sheriff	Ric Bradshaw
State Attorney	Alexcia Cox
Public Defender	Carey Haughwout
Property Appraiser	Dorothy Jacks
Tax Collector	Anne Gannon
Clerk of the Circuit Court and Comptroller	Yvette Drucker
Supervisor of Elections	Wendy Sartory Link
Judiciary	Glenn Kelley
School Board
Position	Incumbent
District 1	Matthew Lane
District 2	Virginia Savietto
District 3	Karen Brill
District 4	Christina Romelus
District 5	Gloria Branch
District 6	John McGovern
District 7	Edwin Ferguson
Superintendent	Michael Burke
Student Representative	Isabella Mirisola

==== List of County Commissioners, 1991–Present ====
Year	County Commission							Commission Makeup
Year	District 1	District 2	District 3	District 4	District 5	District 6	District 7	Commission Makeup
1991	Karen Marcus (R)	Carol Roberts (D)	Carol Elmquist (R)	Mary McCarty (R)	Carole Phillips (D)	Ken Foster (R)	Maude Ford Lee (D)	4R, 3D
1992	Karen Marcus (R)	Carol Roberts (D)	Carol Elmquist (R)	Mary McCarty (R)	Carole Phillips (D)	Ken Foster (R)	Maude Ford Lee (D)	4R, 3D
1993	Karen Marcus (R)	Carol Roberts (D)	Warren Newell (R)	Mary McCarty (R)	Burt Aaronson (D)	Ken Foster (R)	Maude Ford Lee (D)	4R, 3D
1994	Karen Marcus (R)	Carol Roberts (D)	Warren Newell (R)	Mary McCarty (R)	Burt Aaronson (D)	Ken Foster (R)	Maude Ford Lee (D)	4R, 3D
1995	Karen Marcus (R)	Carol Roberts (D)	Warren Newell (R)	Mary McCarty (R)	Burt Aaronson (D)	Ken Foster (R)	Maude Ford Lee (D)	4R, 3D
1996	Karen Marcus (R)	Carol Roberts (D)	Warren Newell (R)	Mary McCarty (R)	Burt Aaronson (D)	Ken Foster (R)	Maude Ford Lee (D)	4R, 3D
1997	Karen Marcus (R)	Carol Roberts (D)	Warren Newell (R)	Mary McCarty (R)	Burt Aaronson (D)	Ken Foster (R)	Maude Ford Lee (D)	4R, 3D
1998	Karen Marcus (R)	Carol Roberts (D)	Warren Newell (R)	Mary McCarty (R)	Burt Aaronson (D)	Ken Foster (R)	Maude Ford Lee (D)	4R, 3D
1999	Karen Marcus (R)	Carol Roberts (D)	Warren Newell (R)	Mary McCarty (R)	Burt Aaronson (D)	Tony Masilotti (R)	Maude Ford Lee (D)	4R, 3D
2000	Karen Marcus (R)	Carol Roberts (D)	Warren Newell (R)	Mary McCarty (R)	Burt Aaronson (D)	Tony Masilotti (R)	Maude Ford Lee (D)	4R, 3D
2001	Karen Marcus (R)	Carol Roberts (D)	Warren Newell (R)	Mary McCarty (R)	Burt Aaronson (D)	Tony Masilotti (R)	Addie Greene (D)	4R, 3D
2002	Karen Marcus (R)	Carol Roberts (D)	Warren Newell (R)	Mary McCarty (R)	Burt Aaronson (D)	Tony Masilotti (R)	Addie Greene (D)	4R, 3D
2003	Karen Marcus (R)	Jeff Koons (D)	Warren Newell (R)	Mary McCarty (R)	Burt Aaronson (D)	Tony Masilotti (R)	Addie Greene (D)	4R, 3D
2004	Karen Marcus (R)	Jeff Koons (D)	Warren Newell (R)	Mary McCarty (R)	Burt Aaronson (D)	Tony Masilotti (R)	Addie Greene (D)	4R, 3D
2005	Karen Marcus (R)	Jeff Koons (D)	Warren Newell (R)	Mary McCarty (R)	Burt Aaronson (D)	Tony Masilotti (R)	Addie Greene (D)	4R, 3D
2006	Karen Marcus (R)	Jeff Koons (D)	Warren Newell (R)	Mary McCarty (R)	Burt Aaronson (D)	Tony Masilotti (R)	Addie Greene (D)	4R, 3D
2007	Karen Marcus (R)	Jeff Koons (D)	Warren Newell (R)	Mary McCarty (R)	Burt Aaronson (D)	Jess Santamaria (D)	Addie Greene (D)	4D, 3R
2008	Karen Marcus (R)	Jeff Koons (D)	Bob Kanjian (R)	Mary McCarty (R)	Burt Aaronson (D)	Jess Santamaria (D)	Addie Greene (D)	4D, 3R
2009	Karen Marcus (R)	Jeff Koons (D)	Shelley Vana (D)	Steven Abrams (R)	Burt Aaronson (D)	Jess Santamaria (D)	Addie Greene (D)	5D, 2R
2010	Karen Marcus (R)	Paulette Burdick (D)	Shelley Vana (D)	Steven Abrams (R)	Burt Aaronson (D)	Jess Santamaria (D)	Priscilla Taylor (D)	5D, 2R
2011	Karen Marcus (R)	Paulette Burdick (D)	Shelley Vana (D)	Steven Abrams (R)	Burt Aaronson (D)	Jess Santamaria (D)	Priscilla Taylor (D)	5D, 2R
2012	Karen Marcus (R)	Paulette Burdick (D)	Shelley Vana (D)	Steven Abrams (R)	Burt Aaronson (D)	Jess Santamaria (D)	Priscilla Taylor (D)	5D, 2R
2013	Hal Valeche (R)	Paulette Burdick (D)	Shelley Vana (D)	Steven Abrams (R)	Mary Lou Berger (D)	Jess Santamaria (D)	Priscilla Taylor (D)	5D, 2R
2014	Hal Valeche (R)	Paulette Burdick (D)	Shelley Vana (D)	Steven Abrams (R)	Mary Lou Berger (D)	Jess Santamaria (D)	Priscilla Taylor (D)	5D, 2R
2015	Hal Valeche (R)	Paulette Burdick (D)	Shelley Vana (D)	Steven Abrams (R)	Mary Lou Berger (D)	Melissa McKinlay (D)	Priscilla Taylor (D)	5D, 2R
2016	Hal Valeche (R)	Paulette Burdick (D)	Shelley Vana (D)	Steven Abrams (R)	Mary Lou Berger (D)	Melissa McKinlay (D)	Priscilla Taylor (D)	5D, 2R
2017	Hal Valeche (R)	Paulette Burdick (D)	Dave Kerner (D)	Steven Abrams (R)	Mary Lou Berger (D)	Melissa McKinlay (D)	Mack Bernard (D)	5D, 2R
2018	Hal Valeche (R)	Paulette Burdick (D)	Dave Kerner (D)	Steven Abrams (R)	Mary Lou Berger (D)	Melissa McKinlay (D)	Mack Bernard (D)	5D, 2R
2019	Hal Valeche (R)	Gregg Weiss (D)	Dave Kerner (D)	Robert Weinroth (D)	Mary Lou Berger (D)	Melissa McKinlay (D)	Mack Bernard (D)	6D, 1R
2020	Hal Valeche (R)	Gregg Weiss (D)	Dave Kerner (D)	Robert Weinroth (D)	Mary Lou Berger (D)	Melissa McKinlay (D)	Mack Bernard (D)	6D, 1R
2021	Maria Marino (R)	Gregg Weiss (D)	Dave Kerner (D)	Robert Weinroth (D)	Maria Sachs (D)	Melissa McKinlay (D)	Mack Bernard (D)	6D, 1R
2022	Maria Marino (R)	Gregg Weiss (D)	Dave Kerner (D)	Robert Weinroth (D)	Maria Sachs (D)	Melissa McKinlay (D)	Mack Bernard (D)	6D, 1R
2023	Maria Marino (R)	Gregg Weiss (D)	Michael Barnett (R)	Marci Woodward (R)	Maria Sachs (D)	Sara Baxter (R)	Mack Bernard (D)	4R, 3D
2024	Maria Marino (R)	Gregg Weiss (D)	Michael Barnett (R)	Marci Woodward (R)	Maria Sachs (D)	Sara Baxter (R)	Mack Bernard (D)	4R, 3D
2025	Maria Marino (R)	Gregg Weiss (D)	Joel Flores (D)	Marci Woodward (R)	Maria Sachs (D)	Sara Baxter (R)	Bobby Powell Jr. (D)	4D, 3R
2026	Maria Marino (R)	Gregg Weiss (D)	Joel Flores (D)	Marci Woodward (R)	Maria Sachs (D)	Sara Baxter (R)	Bobby Powell Jr. (D)	4D, 3R
2027	Maria Marino (R)	Erica Whitfield (D)	Joel Flores (D)	Marci Woodward (R)	Maria Sachs (D)	Katherine Waldron (D)	Bobby Powell Jr. (D)	5D, 2R
Year	District 1	District 2	District 3	District 4	District 5	District 6	District 7	Commission Makeup
Year	County Commission							Commission Makeup

=== Law enforcement ===
Palm Beach County Sheriff's Office
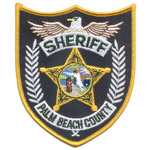
- Abbreviation: PBSO

Agency overview
- Formed: July 1, 1909
- Employees: 4,200+
- Volunteers: 1,800+
- Annual budget: $800,000,000+

Jurisdictional structure
- Operations jurisdiction: United States
- General nature: Local civilian police

Operational structure
- Headquarters: 3228 Gun Club Road, West Palm Beach, Florida 33460
- Agency executive: Sheriff Ric Bradshaw
- Patrol Districts: 20

Website
- www.pbso.org

The Palm Beach County Sheriff's Office (PBSO) provides police services to the county's unincorporated areas and the 13 municipalities covered by PBSO. PBSO also oversees the county jail system, provides security at all four of the county courthouses, and is the primary law enforcement agency covering President Donald J. Trump International Airport. The Sheriff's Office is composed of roughly 4,200 employees, including approximately 1,600 sworn law enforcement personnel, 700 sworn corrections personnel, 1,900 civilian personnel and 1,800 volunteers. The annual operating budget for the PBSO is more than $800 million, as of 2023. Ric Bradshaw has been sheriff for Palm Beach County since 2005.

There are two jail facilities operated by the Palm Beach County Sheriff's Office. One is in Belle Glade, called the West Detention Center, which houses all custody levels from minimum to maximum security. At any one time it can contain up to 991 inmates (total bed capacity), with a staff of 188. The facility has a video visitation program which allows families to communicate with inmates remotely. The largest jail is the Main Detention Center. Three towers - South, East, and West, make up the center. The largest is the South Tower, constructed in 1993 from concrete and steel at a cost of $52 million. The East and West Towers were built in 1983; they now flank the South Tower, completing the Main Detention Center. The Main Detention Center's primary function is to hold high risk inmates, federal inmates, and those inmates who are in need of special medical attention or are otherwise unable to operate at other facilities. The total number of beds at the facility is 2,166. The South Tower can hold 1,285 inmates, the East Tower has 418 beds, and the West Tower has 404 beds.

Since the founding of Palm Beach County in 1909, 16 people have served as county sheriff.

As of 2025, 24 Officers and 1 K9 of the PBSO have been killed in the line of duty.

=== Federal and state representation ===
In the United States House of Representatives, Palm Beach County is represented by three Democrats and one Republican: Sheila Cherfillus-McCormick of the 20th district, Brian Mast of the 21st district, Lois Frankel of the 22nd district, and Jared Moskowitz of the 23rd district.

Nine districts of the Florida House of Representatives represent parts of Palm Beach County, with the seats held by Kelly Skidmore (D) of 81st district, John Snyder (R) of the 82nd district, Rick Roth (R) of the 85th district, Matt Willhite (D) of the 86th district, Emily Gregory (D) of the 87th district, Omari Hardy (D) of the 88th district, Debra Tendrich (D) of the 89th district, Joseph Casello (D) of the 90th district, and Emily Slosberg (D) of the 91st district. Additionally, the county has four seats in the Florida Senate, which are represented by Gayle Harrell (R) of the 25th district, Tina Polsky (D) of the 29th district, Bobby Powell (D) of the 30th district, and Lori Berman (D) of the 31st district.

=== Politics ===
United States presidential election results for Palm Beach County, Florida
Year	Republican		Democratic		Third party(ies)	
Year	No.	%	No.	%	No.	%
1912	31	4.28%	458	63.17%	236	32.55%
1916	311	22.17%	725	51.67%	367	26.16%
1920	1,892	48.69%	1,488	38.29%	506	13.02%
1924	1,726	46.14%	1,543	41.25%	472	12.62%
1928	5,298	64.23%	2,652	32.15%	298	3.61%
1932	4,006	34.12%	7,734	65.88%	0	0.00%
1936	4,478	31.73%	9,635	68.27%	0	0.00%
1940	7,371	38.28%	11,884	61.72%	0	0.00%
1944	7,628	40.75%	11,093	59.25%	0	0.00%
1948	10,996	45.60%	9,408	39.01%	3,711	15.39%
1952	28,595	67.57%	13,723	32.43%	0	0.00%
1956	35,746	71.40%	14,321	28.60%	0	0.00%
1960	45,337	60.28%	29,871	39.72%	0	0.00%
1964	49,614	53.09%	43,836	46.91%	0	0.00%
1968	62,191	53.19%	32,837	28.08%	21,894	18.73%
1972	108,670	72.35%	40,825	27.18%	708	0.47%
1976	98,236	49.45%	96,705	48.68%	3,716	1.87%
1980	143,639	56.79%	91,991	36.37%	17,300	6.84%
1984	186,811	61.67%	116,091	38.32%	29	0.01%
1988	181,495	55.47%	144,199	44.07%	1,523	0.47%
1992	140,350	34.63%	187,869	46.36%	77,032	19.01%
1996	133,811	33.68%	230,687	58.06%	32,856	8.27%
2000	152,964	35.31%	269,754	62.27%	10,504	2.42%
2004	212,688	39.05%	328,687	60.35%	3,247	0.60%
2008	226,037	38.22%	361,271	61.08%	4,128	0.70%
2012	247,398	41.13%	349,651	58.14%	4,390	0.73%
2016	272,402	40.89%	374,673	56.24%	19,137	2.87%
2020	334,711	43.21%	433,572	55.97%	6,314	0.82%
2024	366,836	49.19%	372,512	49.95%	6,400	0.86%

As of 2025, the county has a slight Democratic plurality, with large Republican and independent minorities, respectively. In gubernatorial races, the county had been a stronghold for Democrats, a trend that began in 1990 and continued up until 2022, when Republican governor Ron DeSantis won the county with 51% of the vote against the backdrop of his landslide reelection.

After being carried by the Republican Party nominee in every election from 1948 to 1988, Palm Beach County has supported the Democratic Party nominee for the presidency since 1992. Republicans have been gaining an increasing share of the votes in Palm Beach County since 2000. That year, Al Gore defeated George W. Bush in the county by a margin of approximately 27 percent; two decades later, Joe Biden defeated Donald Trump (who is a resident of the county) by less than 13 percentage points in 2020 and in 2024, Kamala Harris carried the county over Trump by less than one percentage point.

Political Party	Number of registered voters (March 31, 2024)	%
Democratic	322,997	37.73%
Republican	270,826	31.64%
No party affiliation	237,172	27.71%
Minor parties	24,990	2.92%
Total	855,985	100.00

== Transportation ==
=== Roadways ===
An advocacy group has criticized Palm Beach County's roadways for being dangerous for non-motorized users. Local municipalities are working to increase safety, but county and state authorities have been hesitant to modify designs.

==== Expressways ====
- Interstate 95
- Florida's Turnpike

I-95 and Florida's Turnpike are controlled-access expressways that serve Palm Beach county. Southern Boulevard (signed SR 80/US 98), which runs east–west through central Palm Beach County, is a partial freeway from Interstate 95 in West Palm Beach to US 441/SR 7 in Wellington and Royal Palm Beach. In the late 1980s, there were plans to construct two additional expressways in Palm Beach County. One was to be an 11.5 miles (18.5 km) toll freeway from Royal Palm Beach to downtown West Palm Beach. It would have run between Belvedere Road and Okeechobee Boulevard; necessitating the destruction of several homes and churches along its path. The other proposed route was a northern extension of the Sawgrass Expressway which was to be called "University Parkway". The University Parkway would have snaked around suburban developments west of Boca Raton, Delray Beach, and Boynton Beach; its path bordering the Loxahatchee National Wildlife Refuge. Ultimately, both expressways were canceled due to opposition from county residents.

==== Major highways ====
- US 441 / SR 7 (Range Line Road)
- Powerline/Jog Road
- SR 809 / CR 809 (Military Trail)
- SR 807 / CR 807 (Congress Avenue)
- US 1 (Federal Highway) / SR 5 / SR 805
- SR A1A (Ocean Boulevard)
- US 98 (Southern Boulevard) / SR 80 / SR 700
- SR 710 (Bee Line Highway)

=== Railroads ===
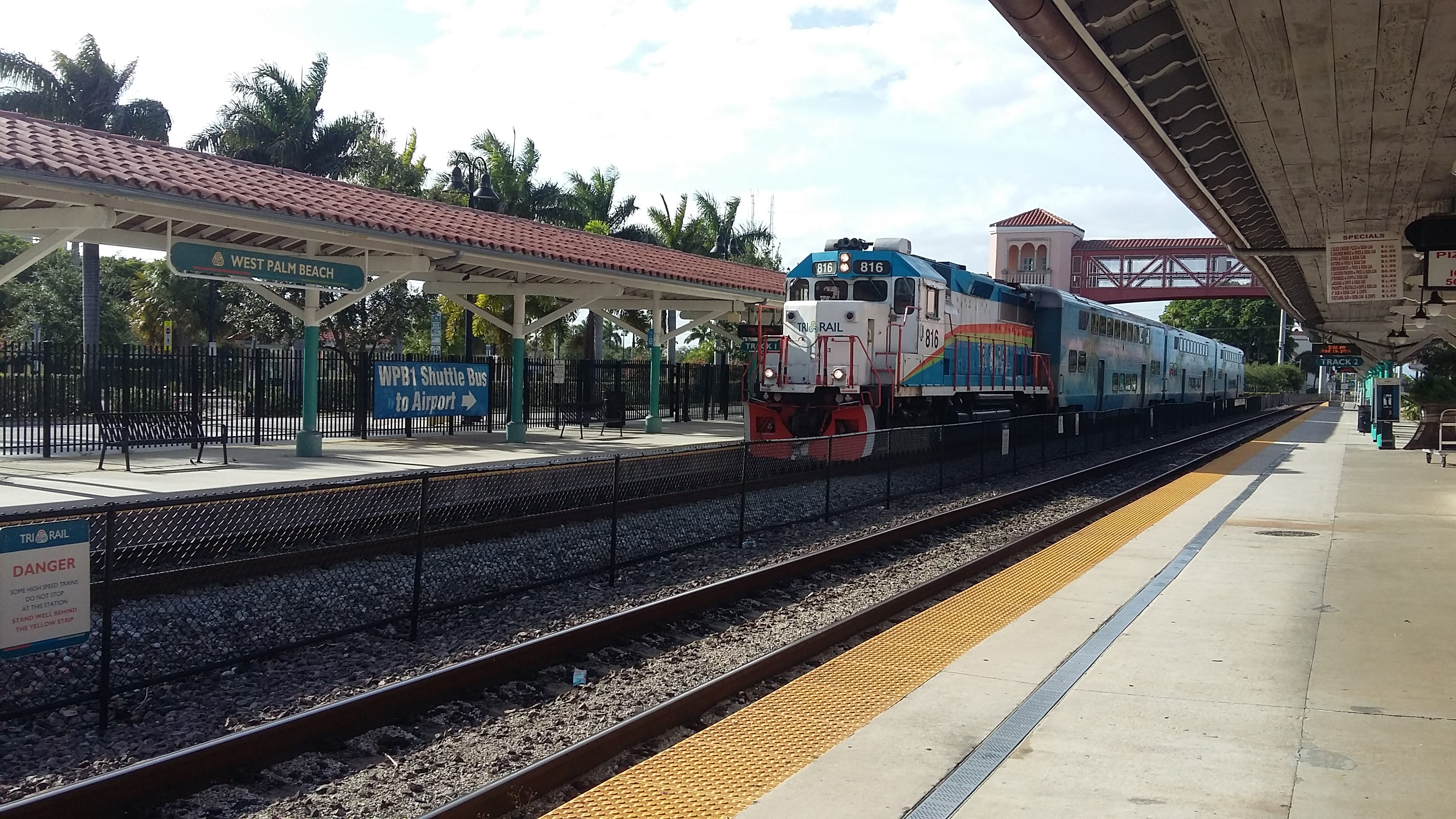
Tri-Rail Commuter Train at West Palm Beach Amtrak/Tri-Rail Station

Palm Beach County is serviced by three railroad options:

- Tri-Rail runs along eastern Palm Beach County, adjacent to Interstate 95 for most of its length. It has stops in Boca Raton, Delray Beach, Boynton Beach, Lake Worth Beach, West Palm Beach, and Mangonia Park.
- The national intercity train system, Amtrak, offers the Silver Meteor and the Silver Star in West Palm Beach and Delray Beach.
- Brightline connects stations located in West Palm Beach and Boca Raton in Palm Beach County to Orlando to the north and to Fort Lauderdale, Aventura and Miami to the south.

=== Airports ===
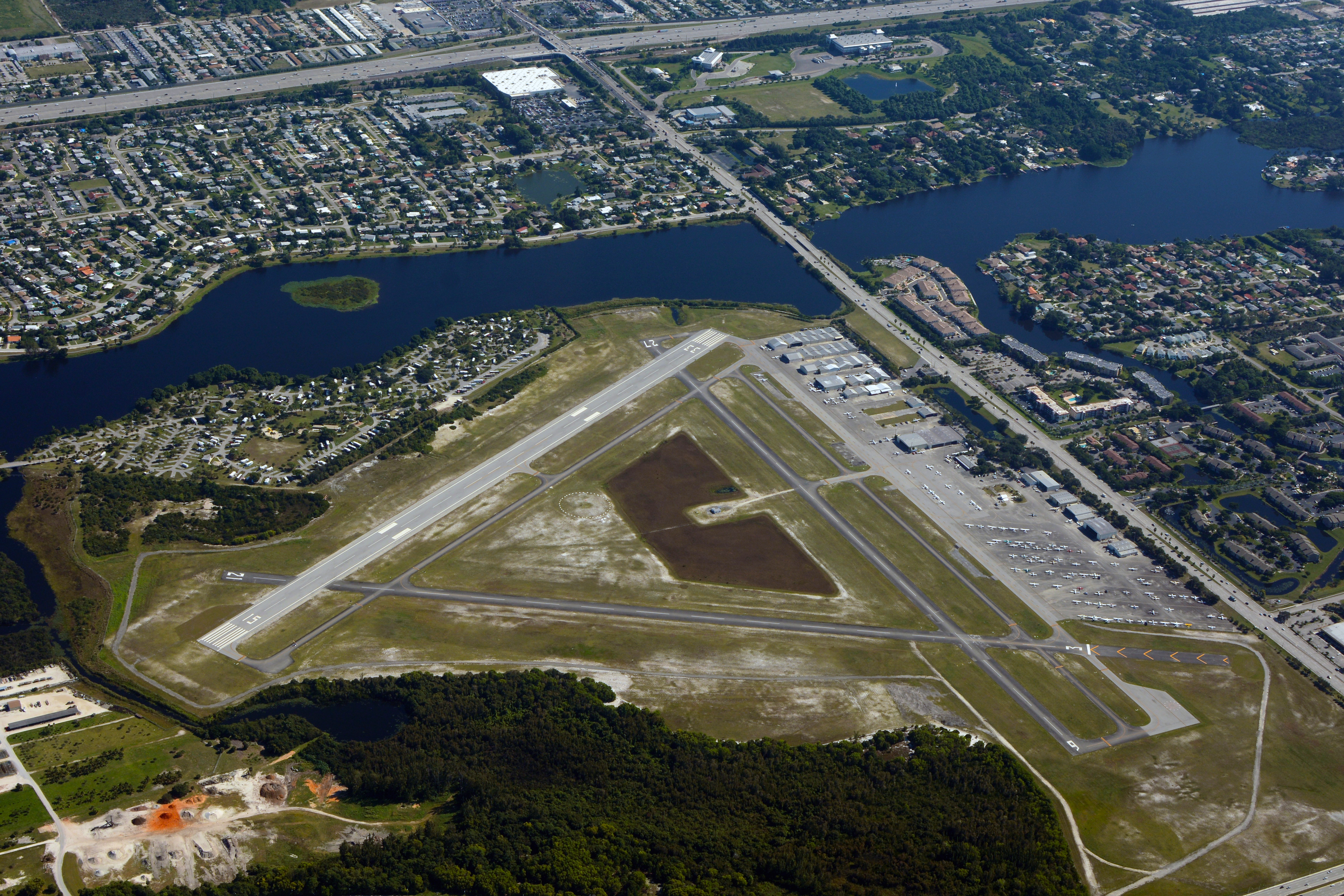
Palm Beach County Park Lantana Airport

- Donald J. Trump International Airport
- Palm Beach County Park Airport
- North Palm Beach County General Aviation Airport
- Boca Raton Airport
- Palm Beach County Glades Airport

=== Public transit ===
- PalmTran provides bus service throughout Palm Beach county.

=== Seaport ===
The Port of Palm Beach is located in Riviera Beach, where Celebration Cruise Line operates 2-day cruises to the Bahamas.

=== Trails ===
The Lake Okeechobee Scenic Trail, a segment of the Florida National Scenic Trail, passes through the county.

== Education ==
=== Primary and secondary schools ===
All of Palm Beach County is served by the School District of Palm Beach County. As of 2026, the School District of Palm Beach County remains one of the largest in the state and country, serving over 180,000 students across more than 180 schools. Newsweek listed three Palm Beach County magnet schools–Atlantic Community High School, Suncoast High School, and the Alexander Dreyfoos School of the Arts–among the top 50 in its "1200 Top U.S. Schools" ranking. Private schools in the county include American Heritage School, Cardinal Newman High School, Jupiter Christian School, The King's Academy, The Benjamin School, Oxbridge Academy, Palm Beach Day Academy, Pope John Paul II High School, St. Andrew's School, and Weinbaum Yeshiva High School.

=== Colleges and universities ===
Palm Beach County is home to a number of public and private institutions of higher education:

- Florida Atlantic University
- Florida International University
- Lynn University
- Nova Southeastern University
- South University
- Palm Beach Atlantic University
- Palm Beach State College
- Keiser University
- Roosevelt Junior College (closed)
- Southeastern College

Several of these institutions engage with the local legal community through partnerships with organizations such as the Palm Beach County Bar Association, promoting law education and civic involvement.

=== Public libraries ===
Palm Beach County is served by the Palm Beach County Library System, established in 1967 through a Special Act of the Florida Legislature, and operates as a department of county government. It is currently made up of 17 library branches, as well as a bookmobile which travels to more than 40 stops each month. As Palm Beach County continues to see population growth, the library system will also need to plan for continued expansion. Presently, the county is building a new 33,000-square-foot branch in the Canyon Town Center, located in western Boynton Beach. This new branch is projected to be completed in 2024. The system's Main Library is located on Summit Boulevard in an unincorporated section of West Palm Beach. It is the largest provider of library services in the county, serving an area that is comparable to the size of the state of Delaware, with holdings of over 1.88 million items.

Unlike many county library systems, including neighboring Broward and Miami-Dade counties, several municipalities continue to operate their own libraries. The county library systems works together in a cooperative system model which allows interoperation between the county system and the 13 city libraries in Boca Raton, Boynton Beach, Delray Beach, Highland Beach, Lake Park, Lake Worth Beach, Lantana, Manalapan (J. Turner Moore Public Library), North Palm Beach, Palm Springs, Palm Beach (Society of the Four Arts), Riviera Beach, and West Palm Beach (Mandel Public Library of West Palm Beach).

The county's first library began as a Free Reading Room in 1895 in West Palm Beach's first church, the Union Congregational Church, when Reverend Asbury Caldwell began collecting books for a reading club he hoped would keep construction workers out of the city's many drinking establishments located along First Street, or "Thirst Street" as it was known. The reading club floundered when Caldwell left West Palm Beach, but in 1899, the West Palm Beach Public Library got its official start, housed in a two-story former Palm Beach Yacht Club building donated by Commodore Charles John Clarke, a Palm Beach yachtsman, with the collection of books from the Reading Room and a $100 donation from Henry Flagler. A permanent building was constructed in 1924 in Flagler Park along the Intracoastal Waterway. Two additional buildings have also housed the library – one at 100 Clematis Street, a state-of-art building complete with a 250-seat auditorium that opened to much fanfare in 1964. The second, located at 411 Clematis Street, is a four-story building in the West Palm Beach City Center complex, which houses both city hall and the library, is two and one-half times the size of the previous building. In 2012, the West Palm Beach Public Library Foundation formally changed its name to the Mandel Public Library of West Palm Beach after receiving a $5 million grant from the Mandel Foundation.

== Communities ==
Map of incorporated cities

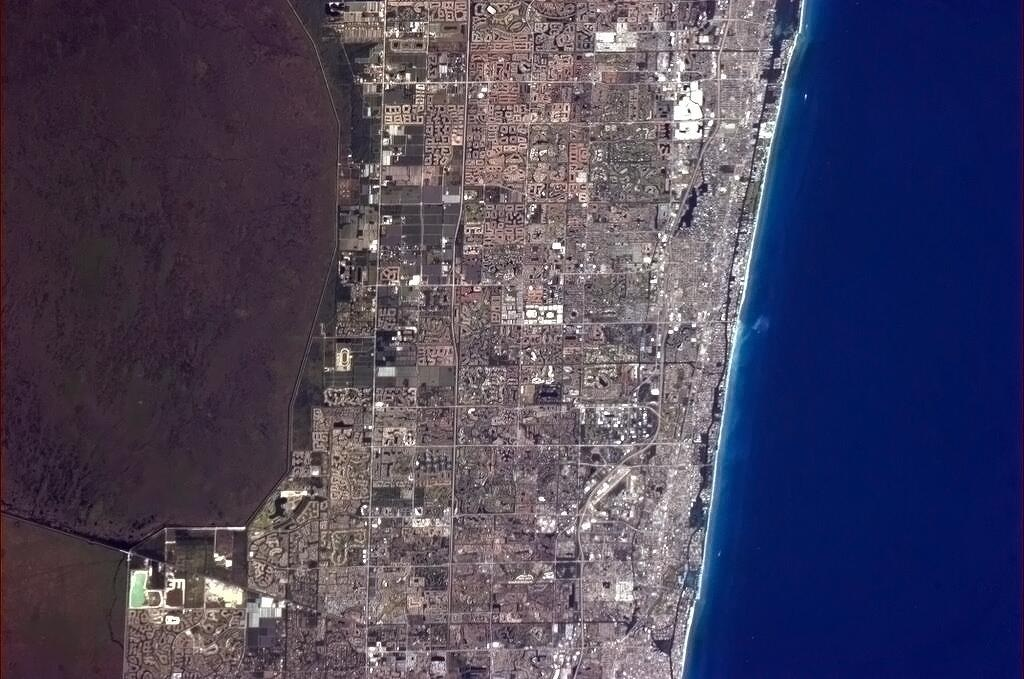
Southeastern Palm Beach County from Boca Raton to Boynton Beach, including Town Center Mall), seen from the International Space Station

The largest city and county seat is West Palm Beach, with a population of 117,415 as of the 2020 US census. Boca Raton, is the southernmost and second-largest, bordering Broward County and having 97,422 people in 2020 within its city limits. Boynton Beach (between Boca Raton and West Palm Beach), is the third-largest city, with a 2020 population nearing 80,380 residents.

The county has 39 municipalities in total. The municipalities are numbered corresponding to the attached image, except for the newest municipality, Westlake. Municipality populations are based on the 2020 census.

#	Incorporated community	Designation	Date incorporated	Population
1	Pahokee	City	1922	5,524
2	Belle Glade	City	April 9, 1928	16,698
3	South Bay	City	1941	4,860
4	Tequesta	Village	1957	6,158
5	Jupiter Inlet Colony	Town	1959	405
6	Jupiter	Town	February 9, 1925	61,047
7	Juno Beach	Town	June 4, 1953	3,858
8	Palm Beach Gardens	City	June 20, 1959	59,182
9	North Palm Beach	Village	August 13, 1956	13,162
10	Lake Park	Town	1923	9,047
11	Riviera Beach	City	September 29, 1922	37,604
12	Palm Beach Shores	Town	1951	1,330
13	Mangonia Park	Town	1947	2,142
14	Palm Beach	Town	April 17, 1911	9,245
15	West Palm Beach	City	November 5, 1894	117,415
16	Haverhill	Town	1950	2,187
17	Glen Ridge	Town	1948	217
18	Cloud Lake	Town	1947	134
19	Palm Springs	Village	July 4, 1957	26,890
20	Lake Clarke Shores	Town	1957	3,564
21	Royal Palm Beach	Village	June 18, 1959	38,932
22	Wellington	Village	December 31, 1995	61,637
23	Greenacres	City	May 24, 1926	43,990
24	Atlantis	City	1959	2,142
25	Lake Worth Beach	City	June 14, 1913	42,219
26	South Palm Beach	Town	1955	1,471
27	Lantana	Town	July 20, 1921	11,504
28	Manalapan	Town	1931	419
29	Hypoluxo	Town	1955	2,687
30	Boynton Beach	City	1920	80,380
31	Ocean Ridge	Town	1931	1,830
32	Golf	Village	1957	255
33	Briny Breezes	Town	March 19, 1963	502
34	Gulf Stream	Town	1925	954
35	Delray Beach	City	October 9, 1911	66,846
36	Highland Beach	Town	1949	4,295
37	Boca Raton	City	May 26, 1925	97,422
38	Loxahatchee Groves	Town	November 1, 2006	3,355
39	Westlake	City	2016	906

Golfview was an incorporated town in Palm Beach County from 1936 until 1997.

=== Census-designated places ===
- Acacia Villas
- Cabana Colony
- Canal Point (bb)
- Gun Club Estates (m)
- Juno Ridge (z)
- Jupiter Farms
- Kenwood Estates
- Lake Belvedere Estates (o)
- Lake Harbor (p)
- Limestone Creek (y)
- Pine Air
- Plantation Mobile Home Park (s)
- Royal Palm Estates (n)
- San Castle
- Schall Circle (v)
- Seminole Manor (j)
- Stacey Street (q)
- The Acreage
- Watergate
- Westgate (t)

=== Former census-designated places ===
Several unincorporated parts of Palm Beach County were listed as census-designated places for the 2000 census, but were not listed for the 2010 census:

- Belle Glade Camp (l)
- Boca Del Mar (c)
- Boca Pointe (a)
- Cypress Lakes (w)
- Dunes Road (cc)
- Fremd Village-Padgett Island (aa)
- Golden Lakes (r)
- Hamptons at Boca Raton (e)
- High Point (i)
- Kings Point (g)
- Lakewood Gardens
- Lake Worth Corridor (k)
- Lakeside Green (x)
- Mission Bay (d)
- Sandalfoot Cove (b)
- Villages of Oriole (h)
- Whisper Walk (f)

=== Unincorporated community ===
- West Boca Raton

=== Adjacent counties ===
Palm Beach County borders Martin County to the north, the Atlantic Ocean to the east, Broward County to the south, Hendry County to the west, and extends into Lake Okeechobee in the northwest, where it borders Okeechobee County and Glades County at one point in the center of the lake.

=== Other unincorporated area ===
- Century Village (u)

=== Former communities ===
- Apix
- Bean City
- Bryant
- Chosen
- Fruitcrest
- Gardena
- Geerworth
- Gladecrest
- Kreamer Island
- Okeelanta
- Ritta Island
- Sand Cut
- Venus
- Yamato Colony

== See also ==
- National Register of Historic Places listings in Palm Beach County, Florida
- List of municipalities in Florida
