= Pawpaw Preserve =

Protected area in Florida

Coordinates: 26°50′49″N 80°03′47″W

Pawpaw Preserve is a protected natural area in Palm Beach County, Florida. At 3 acres, Pawpaw Preserve is Florida's smallest natural area. The raison d'etre of the natural area is to preserve several important native species. The Pawpaw Preserve is named after the endangered four-petal pawpaw (Asimina tetramera) which is found within.

Pawpaw Preserve contains at least 41 native South Florida plants, and 42 native animals. Some of the significant species found in the natural area include Opuntia stricta, West Indian mahogany, the gopher tortoise, and the red widow spider.

Pawpaw preserve contains about 37-39 four-petal pawpaws, and their population appears to be "stable."

The preserve is periodically mowed to simulate the effect of a forest fire, which is a necessary component of the four-petal pawpaw reproduction cycle.
