= Palm Beach County Bar Association =

Voluntary bar association in Florida, US

The Palm Beach County Bar Association (PBCBA) is a voluntary bar association serving legal professionals in Palm Beach County, Florida. Founded in 1922, it provides continuing legal education, professional networking, and community outreach programs to its members. The PBCBA also plays a role in judicial evaluations, local legal reforms, and pro bono legal services. Its headquarters are located in West Palm Beach, and the association has over 2,500 members across the region.

== History and mission ==
The Palm Beach County Bar Association was established in 1922 and has operated continuously as a voluntary association for lawyers and legal professionals in the county. Its mission includes fostering professionalism among members and enhancing public understanding of the law.

== Programs and activities ==
The PBCBA provides a variety of services and programs for legal professionals, including continuing legal education (CLE) courses that allow attorneys to earn required credit hours through live seminars and downloadable recordings.

The association also operates a Lawyer Referral Service (LRS) that connects members of the public with qualified attorneys for initial consultations on legal matters. Attorneys in the referral service must be in good standing and carry professional liability insurance.

The PBCBA maintains numerous committees that focus on specific areas of law and professional development, including criminal law, elder law, judicial relations, and diversity and inclusion efforts within the legal community.
