= Peanut Island =

Island in West Palm Beach, United States

Coordinates: 26°46′25″N 80°02′46″W

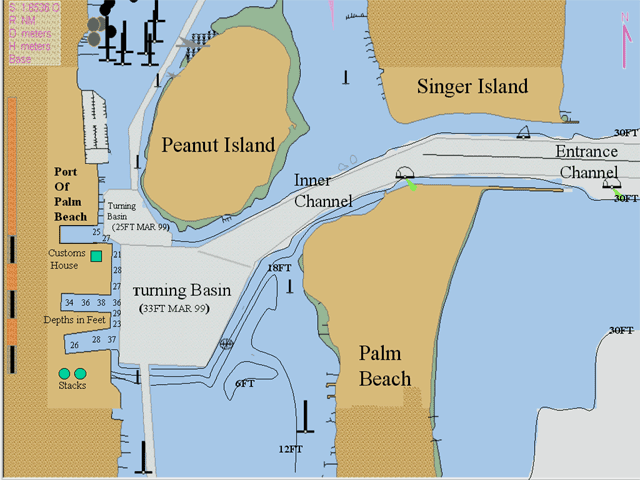
Map showing Peanut Island in relation to the Port of Palm Beach.

Peanut Island is a 79-acre (0.32 km^{2}) island at the mouth of the Lake Worth Inlet in Palm Beach County, Florida, United States. The island was created by dredging-related projects in 1918 which also created the inlet and the Port of Palm Beach.

Originally named Inlet Island, the island was renamed Peanut Island for a planned peanut oil-shipping operation which failed in 1946. A $13-million renovation on the island in 2005 resulted in Peanut Island Park including camp sites, a pier, and a man-made reef. It includes paths that encircle the island, along with gardens and picnic sites.

The island also was the location of a blast shelter built in secret for President John F. Kennedy shortly after his 1960 election. Kennedy often spent winters in nearby Palm Beach, Florida. The shelter, Detachment Hotel, was open for tours for several years, but was closed in October 2017.
