= Ric Bradshaw =

American law enforcement officer (born 1948)

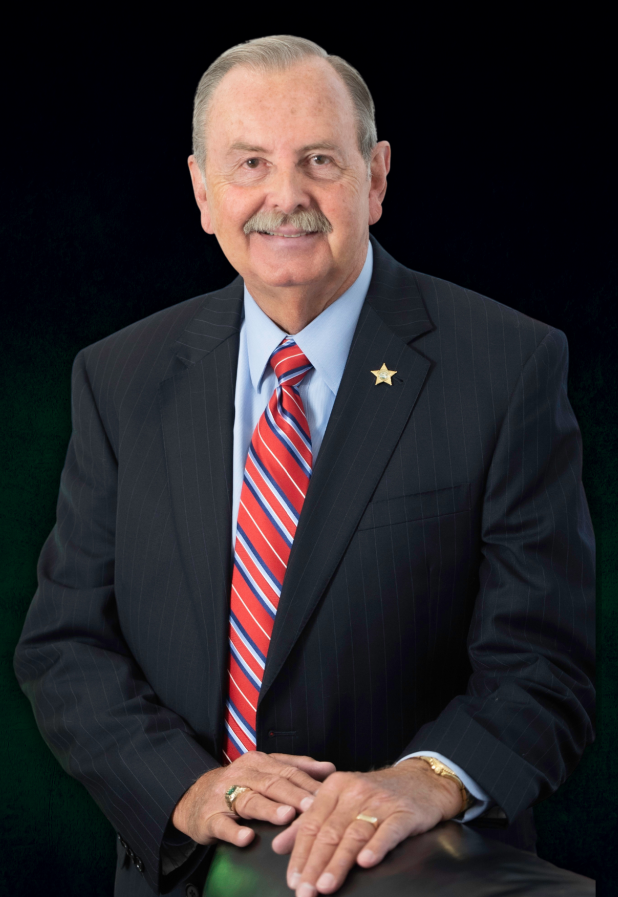
- Official portrait

16th Sheriff of Palm Beach County
- Incumbent
- Assumed office January 4, 2005
- Preceded by: Edward W. Bieluch

Chief of the West Palm Beach Police Department
- In office 1996–2004

Personal details
- Born: March 14, 1948 (age 78)
- Party: Democratic
- Education: Palm Beach Atlantic University (BS); Lynn University (MSA)

Military service
- Branch/service: United States Marine Corps
- Police career
- Allegiance: West Palm Beach, Florida; Palm Beach County
- Department: West Palm Beach Police Department; Palm Beach County Sheriff's Office
- Service years: 1976–2004; 2005–present
- Rank: Chief; Sheriff

Ric L. Bradshaw (born March 14, 1948) is an American politician, law enforcement officer, and Marine Corps veteran who has served as the 16th sheriff of Palm Beach County, Florida since 2005. A member of the Democratic Party, he previously served as chief of the West Palm Beach Police Department from 1996 to 2004. He is the longest-serving sheriff of Palm Beach County. Bradshaw is one of the oldest law enforcement officials in the United States, and still carries his original Colt 45 which was issued to him when he began his career.

== Early life and career ==
Bradshaw was born on March 14, 1948. He graduated from Lake Worth High School and went on to earn his bachelor's degree from Palm Beach Atlantic University and his master's degree from Lynn University. Bradshaw served in the United States Marine Corps.

Bradshaw joined the West Palm Beach Police Department in 1976 and rose through the ranks before being appointed chief of police in 1996.

== Sheriff of Palm Beach County (2005–present) ==
Bradshaw was elected sheriff in November 2004, succeeding Edward W. Bieluch. On January 4, 2005, he was sworn into office as the 16th sheriff of Palm Beach County. He was re-elected in 2008, 2012, and 2016.

Bradshaw has faced scrutiny in connection with the Epstein scandal, particularly regarding the handling of Jeffrey Epstein's work release privileges. In response to allegations that Epstein engaged in improper conduct while on work release, Bradshaw initiated an internal investigation. Attorney Bard Edwards, representing some of Epstein's victims, claimed Epstein "was able to have visitors that were under the age of 21" while on work release.

As sheriff, Bradshaw was significantly involved in the COVID-19 pandemic response in Palm Beach County; enforcing mandatory curfews and mask mandates. He also served during the George Floyd protests, and described the video of George Floyd's murder as "horrific".

In November 2020, Bradshaw was re-elected to a fifth term as sheriff.

In September 2024, Bradshaw received international media attention following the attempted assassination of Donald Trump in Florida.

In November 2024, Bradshaw was re-elected to a sixth term as sheriff, defeating Republican nominee and former chief deputy sheriff Michael Gauger in the general election.

== Personal life ==
In April 2022, Bradshaw was hospitalized for a heart condition. He underwent two open heart surgeries in April and May 2022, respectively.

In July 2024, Bradshaw collapsed in a local Publix and was rushed, via ambulance, to JFK Hospital due to a pre-existing heart condition.

Political offices
Preceded by Edward W. Bieluch	Sheriff of Palm Beach County; 2005–present	Incumbent
