= Detachment Hotel =

Former presidential bunker in Florida

- Kennedy Bunker
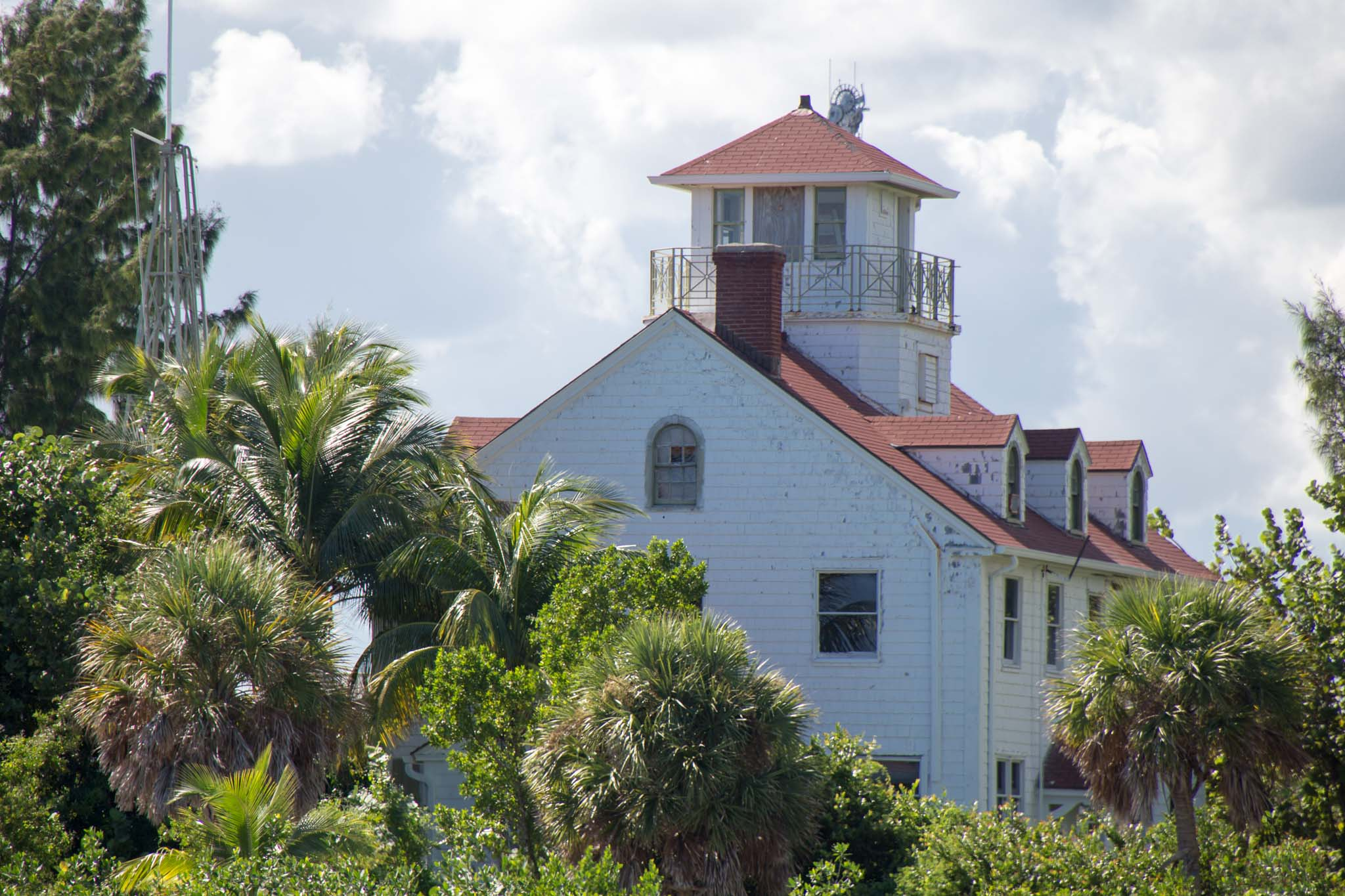
- Exterior view of the building in 2019

- Location within Florida Location within the United States
- 26°46′18″N 80°02′47″W
- Location: Peanut Island, Florida, United States
- Nearest city: Riviera Beach, Florida, United States

History
- Built: 1960
- Original use: bunker, command post

Site notes
- Area: 1,500 square feet (140 m^{2})
- Restored: 1998
- Governing body: Palm Beach Maritime Museum
- Owner: Port of Palm Beach
- Website: www.pbmm.info/home.html

Detachment Hotel (Note: "Hotel" is the telephonic designation for the letter "H" in the NATO phonetic alphabet; U.S. Navy Seabees, responsible for construction of the bunker, are organized into detachments.) (also known as "the Kennedy Bunker") is the name used to refer to a small 1,500-square-foot (140 m^{2}) bunker complex on Peanut Island, Florida. It was originally designed for use by the President of the United States, specifically John F. Kennedy, in the event of a nuclear war. Constructed in 1960, the bunker was closed less than three years later, and its existence was declassified in 1974. From 1998 to 2017, it was open to the public as a historic site.

== Early history ==
The decision to construct a presidential bunker in Florida was driven by the location of a Kennedy family home in Palm Beach, Florida. In the event of a nuclear attack, then-President John Kennedy could be evacuated to the Detachment Hotel site from Palm Beach by helicopter in about five minutes.

The facility was built by the United States Naval Construction Forces ("Seabees") over the course of one-to-two weeks in December 1960, the month prior to Kennedy's inauguration, and was designed to house up to 30 people for 30 days. Access to the facility is through a tunnel of corrugated metal tubing, hardened overhead with lead plating and 12 feet (3.7 m) of dirt. An emergency exit exists opposite the main entrance. The facility also contains a decontamination room and radio room.

The Detachment Hotel site is located near to a small United States Coast Guard station, which provided cover for the project; official communications said the construction was being done to build storage facilities for the nearby station. It is possible Kennedy visited the Detachment Hotel site. According to official files, Kennedy participated in drills that would have taken him to the location on two separate occasions, while a witness has recalled seeing the presidential yacht Honey Fitz operating near Peanut Island at least twice during the Kennedy presidency.

== Public opening ==
The bunker was closed in 1963 following the assassination of John F. Kennedy, and its existence declassified in 1974. Largely abandoned and forgotten, it fell into disrepair in the 1990s. Maintenance of the site was subsequently assumed by the Palm Beach Maritime Museum who restored the facility and opened it to the public in 1998 under the name "the Kennedy Bunker". As of 2016 it was the subject of a dispute between the museum and the Port of Palm Beach, which owns the site. The Port of Palm Beach assumed control of the Kennedy Bunker in 2017 and the Maritime Museum, including the Bunker, was closed. Park officials are not able to say with confidence when, or if, it may reopen.

== See also ==
- Orange One
- Tagansky Protected Command Point
