= Hamptons at Boca Raton, Florida =

- unincorporated place
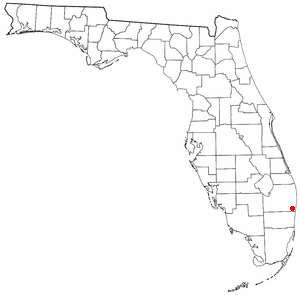
- Location of Hamptons at Boca Raton, Florida
- Coordinates: 26°23′9″N 80°11′4″W
- Country: United States
- State: Florida
- County: Palm Beach

Area
  - Total: 2.7 sq mi (6.9 km^{2})
  - Land: 2.5 sq mi (6.4 km^{2})
  - Water: 0.19 sq mi (0.5 km^{2})
- Elevation: 16 ft (5 m)

Population (2000)
  - Total: 11,306
  - Density: 4,547/sq mi (1,755.7/km^{2})
- Time zone: UTC-5 (Eastern (EST))
  - Summer (DST): UTC-4 (EDT)
- Area codes: 561, 728
- FIPS code: 12-28592
- GNIS feature ID: 1867149

Hamptons at Boca Raton is a former census-designated place (CDP) and current unincorporated place near Boca Raton in Palm Beach County, Florida, United States. The population was 11,306 at the 2000 census.

== Geography ==
Hamptons at Boca Raton is located at 26°23′9″N 80°11′4″W (26.385704, -80.184400).

According to the United States Census Bureau, the CDP has a total area of 6.9 km^{2} (2.7 sq mi), of which 6.4 km^{2} (2.5 sq mi) is land and 0.5 km^{2} (0.19 sq mi) (6.74%) is water.

== Demographics ==
Historical population
Census	Pop.	Note	%±
1990	11,686		—
2000	11,306		−3.3%

As of the census of 2000, there were 11,306 people, 6,336 households, and 3,047 families residing in the CDP. The population density was 1,753.1 people/km^{2} (4,541 people/mi^{2}). There were 7,729 housing units at an average density of 1,198.5 units/km^{2} (3,104 units/mi^{2}). The racial makeup of the CDP was 94.80% White (91.2% were Non-Hispanic White), 1.66% African American, 0.04% Native American, 1.47% Asian, 0.01% Pacific Islander, 0.93% from other races, and 1.09% from two or more races. Hispanic or Latino of any race were 4.62% of the population.

In 2000, there were 6,336 households, out of which 9.9% had children under the age of 18 living with them, 42.6% were married couples living together, 4.2% had a female householder with no husband present, and 51.9% were non-families. 48.3% of all households were made up of individuals, and 43.5% had someone living alone who was 65 years of age or older. The average household size was 1.78 and the average family size was 2.52.

In 2000, in the former CDP, the population was spread out, with 10.6% under the age of 18, 2.7% from 18 to 24, 12.9% from 25 to 44, 13.9% from 45 to 64, and 59.9% who were 65 years of age or older. The median age was 73 years. For every 100 females, there were 70.6 males. For every 100 females age 18 and over, there were 67.4 males.

In 2000, the median income for a household in the CDP was $30,365, and the median income for a family was $47,798. Males had a median income of $41,173 versus $28,906 for females. The per capita income for the CDP was $24,831. About 3.9% of families and 7.3% of the population were below the poverty line, including 2.4% of those under age 18 and 8.8% of those age 65 or over.

As of 2000, English was the first language for 84.48% of all residents, while Yiddish comprised 6.04%, Spanish made up 5.25%, Polish accounted for 1.31%, German was totaled at 0.98%, French totaled 0.65%, Hebrew was at 0.51%, Arabic at 0.42%, and Portuguese was the mother tongue for 0.32% of the population.
