= Mission Bay, Florida =

- unincorporated place
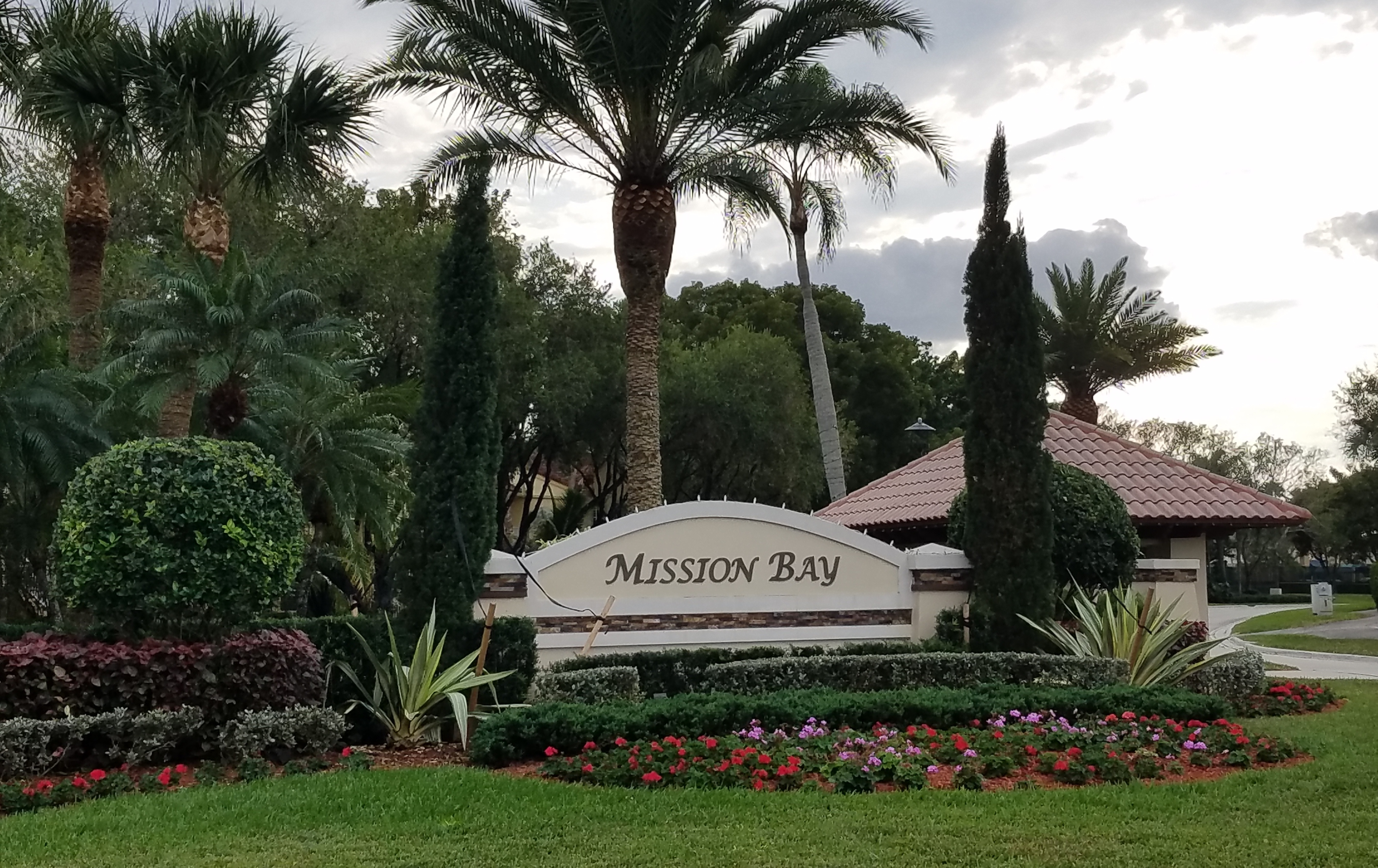

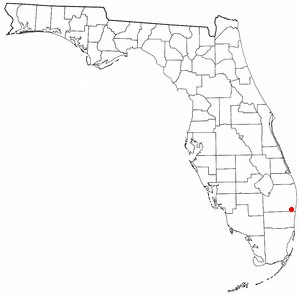
- Location of Mission Bay, Florida
- Coordinates: 26°21′59″N 80°13′0″W
- Country: United States
- State: Florida
- County: Palm Beach

Area
  - Total: 0.77 sq mi (2.0 km^{2})
  - Land: 0.77 sq mi (2.0 km^{2})
  - Water: 0 sq mi (0.0 km^{2})
- Elevation: 13 ft (4 m)

Population (2000)
  - Total: 2,926
  - Density: 3,786/sq mi (1,461.6/km^{2})
- Time zone: UTC-5 (Eastern (EST))
  - Summer (DST): UTC-4 (EDT)
- Area codes: 561, 728
- FIPS code: 12-46040
- GNIS feature ID: 1867176

Mission Bay was a census-designated place (CDP) and current unincorporated place west of Boca Raton in Palm Beach County, Florida, United States. The population was 2,926 at the 2000 census.

== Geography ==
Mission Bay is located at 26°21′59″N 80°13′0″W (26.366422, -80.216790).

According to the United States Census Bureau, the CDP has a total area of 2.0 km^{2} (0.77 sq mi), all land.

== Demographics ==
As of the census of 2000, there were 2,926 people, 1,016 households, and 846 families residing in the CDP. The population density was 1,467.2 people/km^{2} (3,800 people/mi^{2}). There were 1,108 housing units at an average density of 555.6 units/km^{2} (1,439 units/mi^{2}). The racial makeup of the CDP was 92.69% White (85.2% were Non-Hispanic White), 1.40% African American, 2.70% Asian, 0.14% Pacific Islander, 1.16% from other races, and 1.91% from two or more races. Hispanic or Latino of any race were 9.88% of the population.

In 2000, there were 1,016 households, out of which 46.7% had children under the age of 18 living with them, 72.1% were married couples living together, 8.6% had a female householder with no husband present, and 16.7% were non-families. 13.4% of all households were made up of individuals, and 3.1% had someone living alone who was 65 years of age or older. The average household size was 2.88 and the average family size was 3.18.

In 2000, in the former CDP, the population was spread out, with 29.6% under the age of 18, 5.5% from 18 to 24, 28.1% from 25 to 44, 26.8% from 45 to 64, and 10.0% who were 65 years of age or older. The median age was 38 years. For every 100 females, there were 93.6 males. For every 100 females age 18 and over, there were 90.9 males.

In 2000, the median income for a household in the CDP was $86,985, and the median income for a family was $92,013. Males had a median income of $61,607 versus $39,188 for females. The per capita income for the CDP was $34,913. About 2.1% of families and 2.3% of the population were below the poverty line, including 3.1% of those under age 18 and none of those age 65 or over.

As of 2000, English was the first language for 82.82% of all residents, while Spanish made up 14.14%, and Italian was the mother tongue for 3.03% of the population.
