= Hugh Willoughby (disambiguation) =

Hugh Willoughby (died 1554) was an early English Arctic voyager.

Hugh Willoughby may also refer to:

- Hugh Willoughby, 12th Baron Willoughby of Parham (died 1712), English peer
- Hugh Willoughby, 15th Baron Willoughby of Parham (1714–1765), English nobleman and peer
- Hugh Willoughby (scientist), American atmospheric and hydrospheric scientist
- Hugh L. Willoughby (1856–1939), early designer and builder of seaplanes

== See also ==
- Hugh de Willoughby, English medieval theologian and university chancellor
- Hugh de Willoughby (1135–1205), English knight and nobleman
