= Draining and development of the Everglades =

Development of the Florida Everglades

Coordinates: 26.0°N 80.7°W

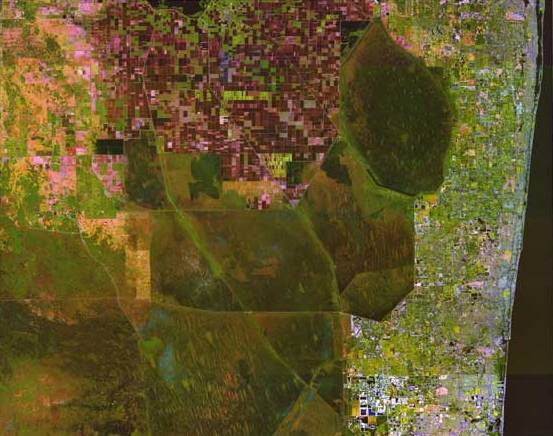
Satellite image of the northern Everglades with developed areas in 2001, including the Everglades Agricultural Area (in red), Water Conservation Areas 1, 2, and 3, and the South Florida metropolitan area Source: U.S. Geological Survey

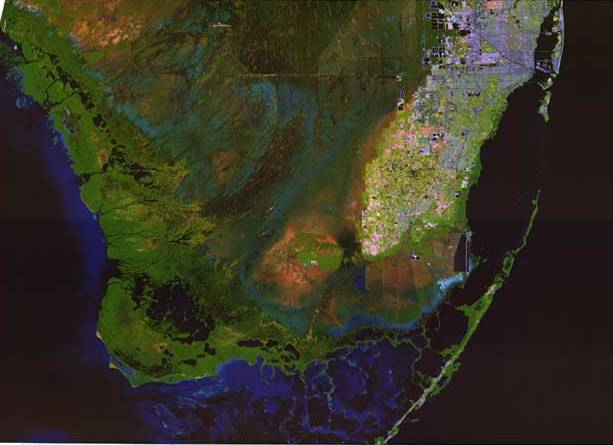
Satellite image of the southern Everglades with developed areas in 2001, including Everglades National Park, Big Cypress National Preserve, Florida Bay and the southern tip of the South Florida metropolitan area Source: U.S. Geological Survey

A national push for expansion and progress toward the latter part of the 19th century stimulated interest in draining the Everglades, a region of tropical wetlands in southern Florida, for agricultural use. According to historians, "From the middle of the nineteenth century to the middle of the twentieth century, the United States went through a period in which wetland removal was not questioned. Indeed, it was considered the proper thing to do."

A pattern of political and financial motivation, and a lack of understanding of the geography and ecology of the Everglades have plagued the history of drainage projects. The Everglades are a part of a massive watershed that originates near Orlando and drains into Lake Okeechobee, a vast and shallow lake. As the lake exceeds its capacity in the wet season, the water forms a flat and very wide river, about 100 miles (160 km) long and 60 miles (97 km) wide. As the land from Lake Okeechobee slopes gradually to Florida Bay, water flows at a rate of half a mile (0.8 km) a day. Before human activity in the Everglades, the system comprised the lower third of the Florida peninsula. The first attempt to drain the region was made by real estate developer Hamilton Disston in 1881. Disston's sponsored canals were unsuccessful, but the land he purchased for them stimulated economic and population growth that attracted railway developer Henry Flagler. Flagler built a railroad along the east coast of Florida and eventually to Key West; towns grew and farmland was cultivated along the rail line.

During his 1904 campaign to be elected governor, Napoleon Bonaparte Broward promised to drain the Everglades, and his later projects were more effective than Disston's. Broward's promises sparked a land boom facilitated by blatant errors in an engineer's report, pressure from real estate developers, and the burgeoning tourist industry throughout south Florida. The increased population brought hunters who went unchecked and had a devastating impact on the numbers of wading birds (hunted for their plumes), alligators, and other Everglades animals.

Severe hurricanes in 1926 and 1928 caused catastrophic damage and flooding from Lake Okeechobee that prompted the Army Corps of Engineers to build a dike around the lake. Further floods in 1947 prompted an unprecedented construction of canals throughout southern Florida. Following another population boom after World War II, and the creation of the Central and Southern Florida Flood Control Project, the Everglades was divided into sections separated by canals and water control devices that delivered water to agricultural and newly developed urban areas. However, in the late 1960s, following a proposal to construct a massive airport next to Everglades National Park, national attention turned from developing the land to restoring the Everglades.

== Exploration ==
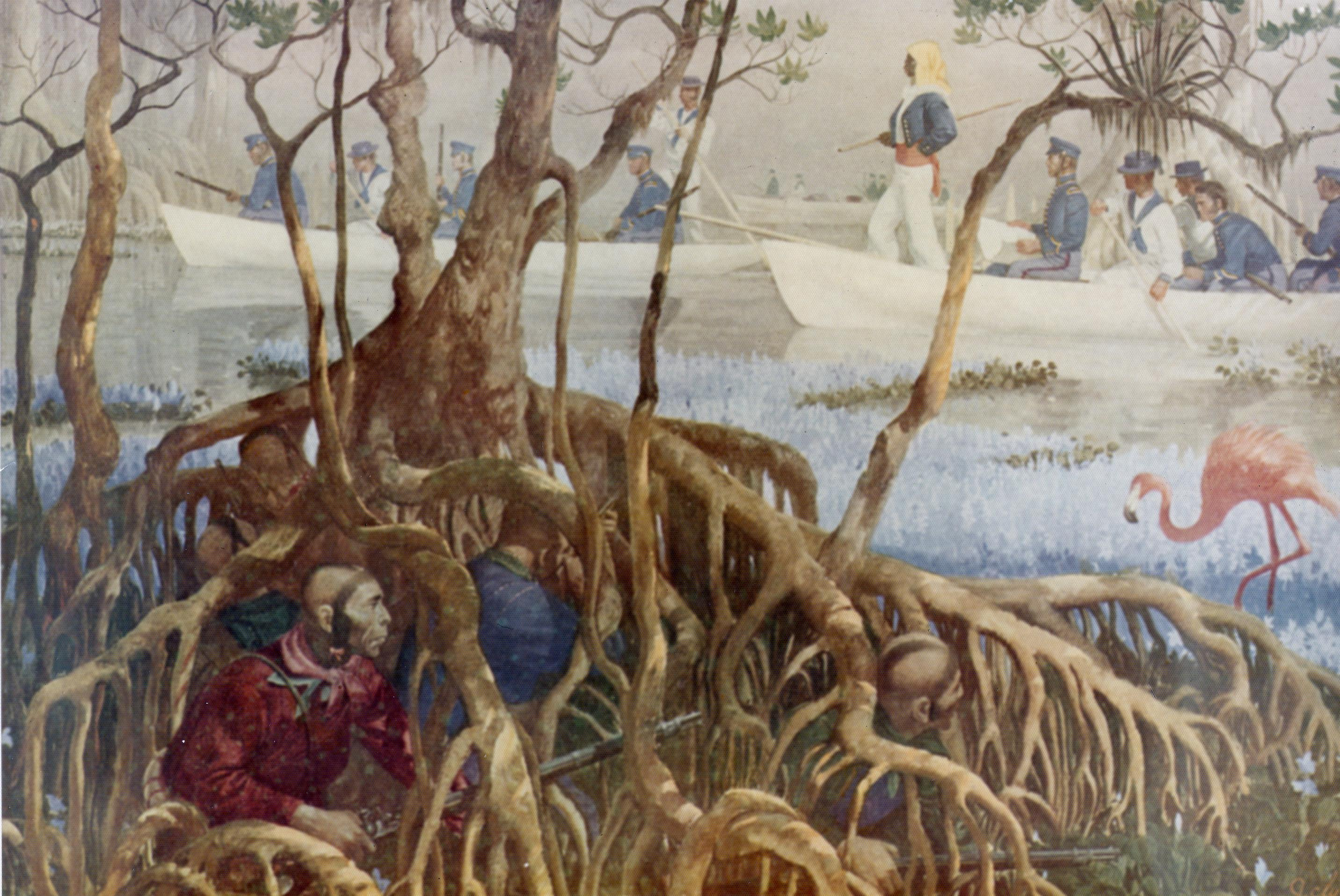
Marines search for Seminoles among the mangroves during the Second Seminole War

American involvement in the Everglades began during the Second Seminole War (1836–1842), a costly and very unpopular conflict. The United States spent between $30 million and $40 million and lost between 1,500 and 3,000 lives. The U.S. military drove the Seminoles into the Everglades and were charged with the task of finding them, defeating them, and moving them to Oklahoma Indian Territory. Almost 4,000 Seminoles were killed in the war or were removed. The U.S. military was completely unprepared for the conditions they found in the Everglades. They tore their clothes on sawgrass, ruined their boots on the uneven limestone floor, and were plagued by mosquitoes. Soldiers' legs, feet, and arms were cut open on the sawgrass and gangrene infection set in, taking many lives and limbs. Many died of mosquito-borne illness. After slogging through mud, one private died in his tracks of exhaustion in 1842. General Thomas Jesup admitted the military was overwhelmed by the terrain when he wrote to the Secretary of War in 1838, trying to dissuade him from prolonging the war.

Opinion about the value of Florida to the Union was mixed: some thought it a useless land of swamps and horrible animals, while others thought it a gift from God for national prosperity. In 1838 comments in The Army and Navy Chronicle supported future development of southern Florida:

[The] climate [is] most delightful; but, from want of actual observation, [it] could not speak so confidently of the soil, although, from the appearance of the surrounding vegetation, a portion of it, at least, must be rich. Whenever the aborigines shall be forced from their fastnesses, as eventually they must be, the enterprising spirit of our countrymen will very soon discover the sections best adapted to cultivation, and the now barren or unproductive everglades will be made to blossom like a garden. It is the general impression that these everglades are uninhabitable during the summer months, by reason of their being overflowed by the abundant rains of the season; but if it should prove that these inundations are caused or increased by obstructions to the natural courses of the rivers, as outlets to the numerous lakes, American industry will remove these obstructions.

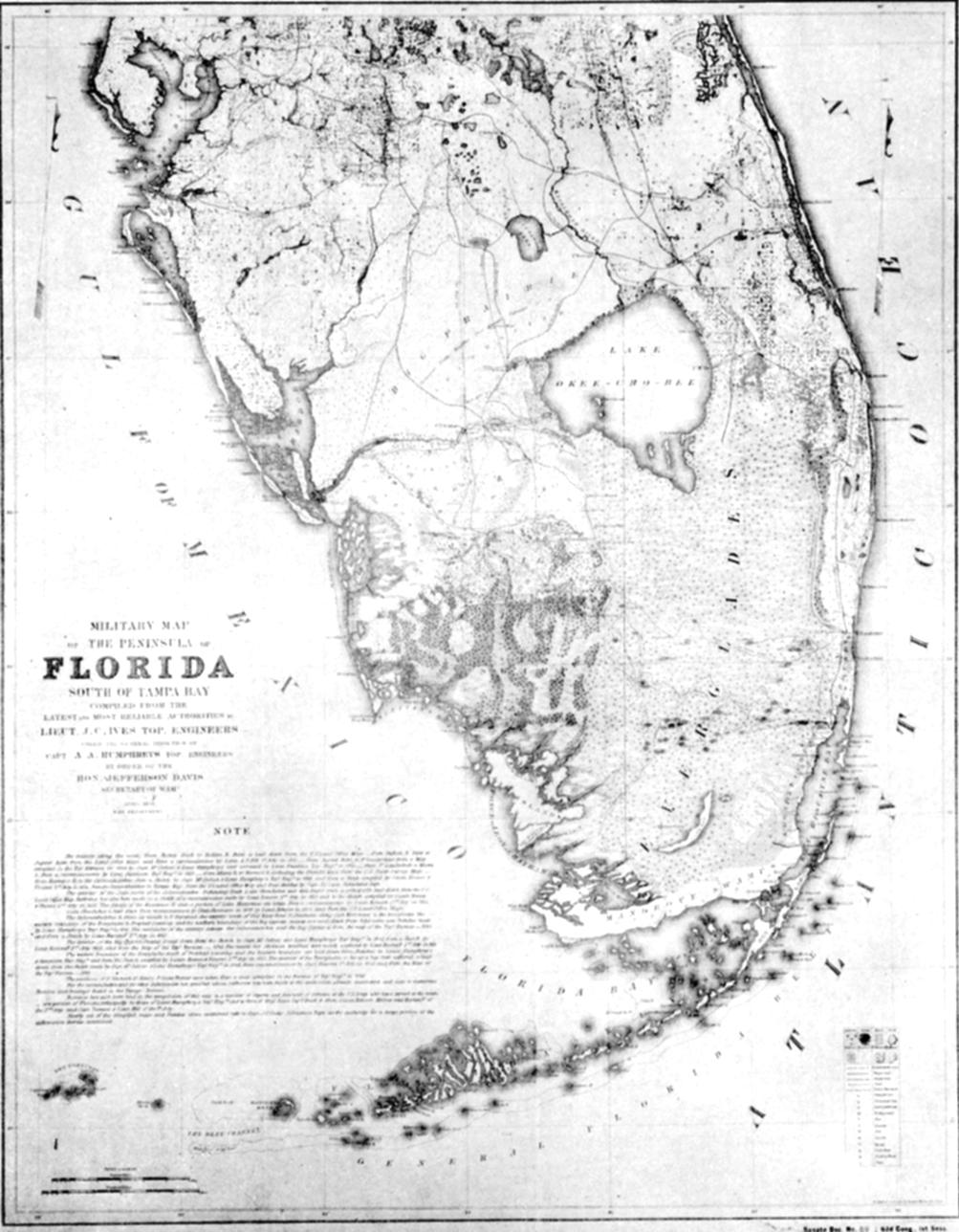
Map of the Everglades by the U.S. War Department in 1856: Military action during the Seminole Wars improved understanding of the features of the Everglades.

The military penetration of southern Florida offered the opportunity to map a poorly understood part of the country. As late as 1823, official reports doubted the existence of a large inland lake, until the military met the Seminoles at the Battle of Lake Okeechobee in 1837. To avenge repeated surprise attacks on himself and ammunition stores, Colonel William Harney led an expedition into the Everglades in 1840, to hunt for a chief named Chekika. With Harney were 90 soldiers in 16 canoes. One soldier's account of the trip in the St. Augustine News was the first printed description of the Everglades available to the general public. The anonymous writer described the hunt for Chekika and the terrain they were crossing: "No country that I have ever heard of bears any resemblance to it; it seems like a vast sea filled with grass and green trees, and expressly intended as a retreat for the rascally Indian, from which the white man would never seek to drive them".

The final blame for the military stalemate was determined to lie not in military preparation, supplies, leadership, or superior tactics by the Seminoles, but in Florida's impenetrable terrain. An army surgeon wrote: "It is in fact a most hideous region to live in, a perfect paradise for Indians, alligators, serpents, frogs, and every other kind of loathsome reptile." The land seemed to inspire extreme reactions of wonder or hatred. In 1870, an author described the mangrove forests as a "waste of nature's grandest exhibition to have these carnivals of splendid vegetation occurring in isolated places where it is but seldom they are seen." A band of hunters, naturalists, and collectors ventured through in 1885, taking along with them the 17-year-old grandson of an early resident of Miami. The landscape unnerved the young man shortly after he entered the Shark River: "The place looked wild and lonely. About three o'clock it seemed to get on Henry's nerves and we saw him crying, he would not tell us why, he was just plain scared."

In 1897, Hugh L. Willoughby spent eight days canoeing with a party from the mouth of the Harney River to the Miami River. He wrote about his observations and sent them back to the New Orleans Times-Democrat. Willoughby described the water as healthy and wholesome, with numerous springs, and 10,000 alligators "more or less" in Lake Okeechobee. The party encountered thousands of birds near the Shark River, "killing hundreds, but they continued to return". Willoughby pointed out that much of the rest of the country had been mapped and explored except for this part of Florida, writing, "(w)e have a tract of land one hundred and thirty miles long and seventy miles wide that is as much unknown to the white man as the heart of Africa."

== Drainage ==
As early as 1837, a visitor to the Everglades suggested the value of the land without the water:

Could it be drained by deepening the natural outlets? Would it not open to cultivation immense tracts of rich vegetable soil? Could the waterpower, obtained by draining, be improved to any useful purpose? Would such draining render the country unhealthy? ... Many queries like these passed through our minds. They can only be solved by a thorough examination of the whole country. Could the waters be lowered ten feet, it would probably drain six hundred thousand acres; should this prove to be a rich soil, as would seem probable, what a field it would open for tropical productions! What facilities for commerce!

Territorial representative David Levy proposed a resolution that was passed in Congress in 1842: "that the Secretary of War be directed to place before this House such information as can be obtained in relation to the practicability and probable expense of draining the everglades of Florida." From this directive Secretary of the Treasury Robert J. Walker requested Thomas Buckingham Smith from St. Augustine to consult those with experience in the Everglades on the feasibility of draining them, saying that he had been told two or three canals to the Gulf of Mexico would be sufficient. Smith asked officers who had served in the Seminole Wars to respond, and many favored the idea, promoting the land as a future agricultural asset to the South. A few disagreed, such as Captain John Sprague, who wrote he "never supposed the country would excite an inquiry, other than as a hiding place for Indians, and had it occurred to me that so great an undertaking, one so utterly impracticable, as draining the Ever Glades was to be discussed, I should not have destroyed the scratch of pen upon a subject so fruitful, and which cannot be understood but by those who have waded the water belly deep and examined carefully the western coast by land and by water."

Nevertheless, Smith returned a report to the Secretary of the Treasury asking for $500,000 to do the job. The report is the first published study on the topic of the Everglades, and concluded with the statement:

The Ever Glades are now suitable only for the haunt of noxious vermin or the resort of pestilent reptiles. The statesman whose exertions shall cause the millions of acres they contain, now worse than worthless, to teem with the products of agricultural industry; that man who thus adds to the resources of his country ... will merit a high place in public favor, not only with his own generation, but with posterity. He will have created a State!

Smith suggested cutting through the rim of the Everglades (known today as the Atlantic Coastal Ridge), connecting the heads of rivers to the coastline so that 4 feet (1.2 m) of water would be drained from the area. The result, Smith hoped, would yield farmland suitable for corn, sugar, rice, cotton, and tobacco.

In 1850 Congress passed a law that gave several states wetlands within their state boundaries. The Swamp Land Act of 1850 ensured that the state would be responsible for funding the attempts at developing wetlands into farmlands. Florida quickly formed a committee to consolidate grants to pay for such attempts, though attention and funds were diverted owing to the Civil War and Reconstruction. Not until after 1877 did attention return to the Everglades.

=== Hamilton Disston's canals ===
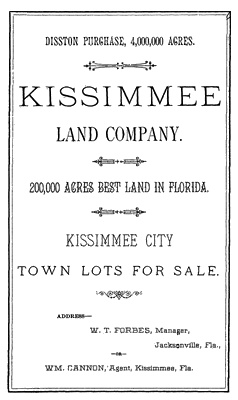
Hamilton Disston's land sale notice

After the Civil War, an agency named the Internal Improvement Fund (IIF), charged with using grant money to improve Florida's infrastructure through canals, rail lines, and roads, was eager to be rid of the debt incurred by the Civil War. IIF trustees found a Pennsylvania real estate developer named Hamilton Disston who was interested in implementing plans to drain the land for agriculture. Disston was persuaded to buy 4,000,000 acres (16,000 km^{2}) of land for $1 million in 1881 ($33.4 million in 2025). The New York Times declared it the largest purchase of land ever by any individual. Disston began building canals near St. Cloud to lower the basin of the Caloosahatchee and Kissimmee Rivers. His workers and engineers faced conditions similar to those of the soldiers during the Seminole Wars; it was harrowing, backbreaking labor in dangerous conditions. The canals seemed at first to work in lowering the water levels in the wetlands surrounding the rivers. Another dredged waterway between the Gulf of Mexico and Lake Okeechobee was built, opening the region to steamboat traffic.

Disston's engineers focused on Lake Okeechobee as well. As one colleague put it, "Okeechobee is the point to attack"; the canals were to be "equal or greater than the inflow from the Kissimmee valley, which is the source of all the evil." Disston sponsored the digging of a canal 11 miles (18 km) long from Lake Okeechobee towards Miami, but it was abandoned when the rock proved denser than the engineers had expected. Though the canals lowered the groundwater, their capacity was inadequate for the wet season. A report that evaluated the failure of the project concluded: "The reduction of the waters is simply a question of sufficient capacity in the canals which may be dug for their relief".

Though Disston's canals did not drain, his purchase primed the economy of Florida. It made news and attracted tourists and land buyers alike. Within four years property values doubled, and the population increased significantly. One newcomer was the inventor Thomas Edison, who bought a home in Fort Myers. Disston opened real estate offices throughout the United States and Europe, and sold tracts of land for $5 an acre, establishing towns on the west coast and in central Florida. English tourists in particular were targeted and responded in large numbers. Florida passed its first water laws to "build drains, ditches, or water courses upon petition of two or more landowners" in 1893.

=== Henry Flagler's railroads ===
Due to Disston's purchase, the IIF was able to sponsor railroad projects, and the opportunity presented itself when oil tycoon Henry Flagler became enchanted with St. Augustine during a vacation. He built the opulent Ponce de Leon Hotel in St. Augustine in 1888, and began buying land and building rail lines along the east coast of Florida, first from Jacksonville to Daytona, then as far south as Palm Beach in 1893. Flagler's establishment of "the Styx", a settlement for hotel and rail line workers across the river from the barrier island containing Palm Beach, became West Palm Beach. Along the way he built resort hotels, transforming territorial outposts into tourist destinations and the land bordering the rail lines into citrus farms.

The winter of 1894–1895 produced a bitter frost that killed citrus trees as far south as Palm Beach. Miami resident Julia Tuttle sent Flagler a pristine orange blossom and an invitation to visit Miami, to persuade him to build the railroad farther south. Although he had earlier turned her down several times, Flagler finally agreed, and by 1896 the rail line had been extended to Biscayne Bay. Three months after the first train arrived, the residents of Miami, 512 in all, voted to incorporate the town. Flagler publicized Miami as a "Magic City" throughout the United States and it became a prime destination for the extremely wealthy after the Royal Palm Hotel was opened.

=== Broward's "Empire of the Everglades" ===
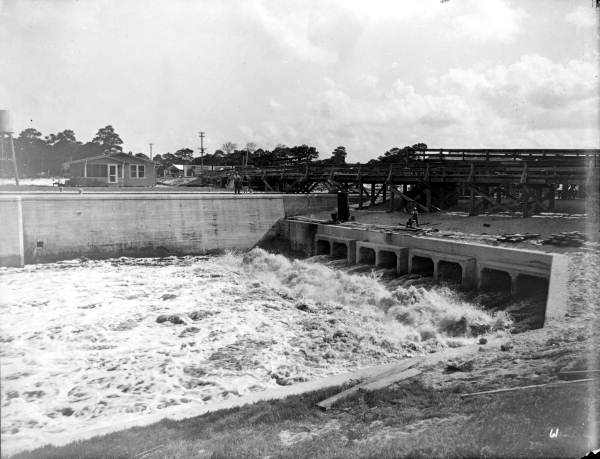
A canal lock in the Everglades Drainage District around 1915

Despite the sale of 4,000,000 acres (16,000 km^{2}) to Disston and the skyrocketing price of land, by the turn of the 20th century the IIF was bankrupt due to mismanagement. Legal battles ensued between the State of Florida and the railroad owners about who owned the rights to sell reclaimed land in the Everglades. In 1904 gubernatorial campaigning, the strongest candidate, Napoleon Bonaparte Broward, made draining the Everglades a major plan. He called the future of south Florida the "Empire of the Everglades" and compared its potential to that of Holland and Egypt: "It would indeed be a commentary on the intelligence and energy of the State of Florida to confess that so simple an engineering feat as the drainage of a body of land above the sea was above their power", he wrote to voters. Soon after his election, he fulfilled his promise to "drain that abominable pestilence-ridden swamp" and pushed the Florida legislature to form a group of commissioners to oversee reclamation of flooded lands. They began by taxing counties that would be affected by the drainage attempts, at 5 cents an acre, and formed the Everglades Drainage District in 1907.

Broward asked James O. Wright—an engineer on loan to the State of Florida from the USDA's Bureau of Drainage Investigations—to draw up plans for drainage in 1906. Two dredges were built by 1908, but had cut only 6 miles (9.7 km) of canals. The project quickly ran out of money, so Broward sold real estate developer Richard "Dicky" J. Bolles a million dollars' worth of land in the Everglades, 500,000 acres (2,000 km^{2}), before the engineer's report had been submitted. Abstracts from Wright's report were given to the IIF stating that eight canals would be enough to drain 1,850,000 acres (7,500 km^{2}) at a cost of a dollar an acre. The abstracts were released to real estate developers who used them in their advertisements, and Wright and the USDA were pressed by the real estate industry to publicize the report as quickly as possible. Wright's supervisor noted errors in the report, as well as undue enthusiasm for draining, and delayed its release in 1910. Different unofficial versions of the report circulated—some that had been altered by real estate interests—and a version hastily put together by Senator Duncan U. Fletcher called U.S. Senate Document 89 included early unrevised statements, causing a frenzy of speculation.

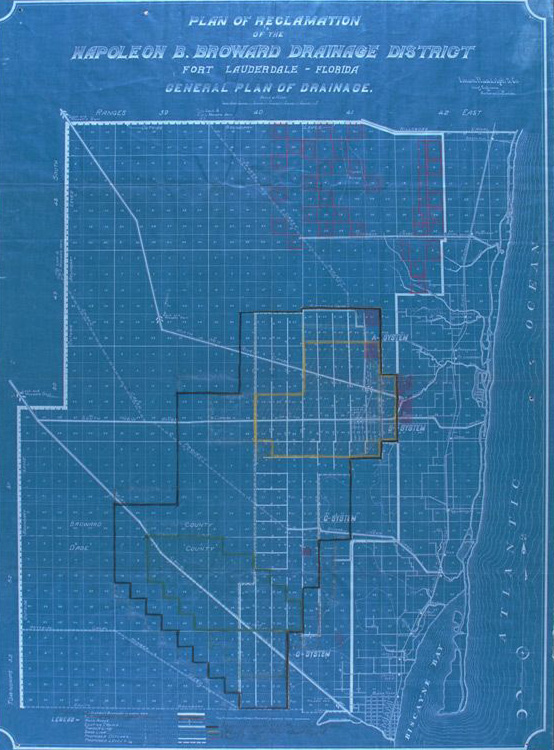
Blueprint for drainage canals in the Everglades in 1921

Wright's initial report concluded that drainage would not be difficult. Building canals would be more cost effective than constructing a dike around Lake Okeechobee. The soil would be fertile after drainage, the climate would not be adversely affected, and the enormous lake would be able to irrigate farmland in the dry season. Wright based his conclusions on 15 years of weather data since the recording of precipitation began in the 1890s. His calculations concentrated on the towns of Jupiter and Kissimmee. Since weather data had not been recorded for any area within the Everglades, none was included in the report. Furthermore, the heaviest year of rain on record, Wright assumed, was atypical, and he urged that canals should not be constructed to bear that amount of water due to the expense. Wright's calculations for what canals should be able to hold were off by 55 percent. His most fundamental mistake, however, was designing the canals for a maximum rainfall of 4 inches (10 cm) of water a day, based on flawed data for July and August rainfall, despite available data that indicated torrential downpours of 10 inches (25 cm) and 12 inches (30 cm) had occurred in 24-hour periods.

Though a few voices expressed skepticism of the report's conclusions—notably Frank Stoneman, editor of the Miami Evening Record and the later Miami Morning News-Record (predecessors of the Miami Herald)—the report was hailed as impeccable, coming from a branch of the U.S. government. In 1912 Florida appointed Wright to oversee the drainage, and the real estate industry energetically misrepresented this mid-level engineer as the world's foremost authority on wetlands drainage, in charge of the U.S. Bureau of Reclamation. However, the U.S. House of Representatives investigated Wright since no report had officially been published despite the money paid for it. Wright eventually retired when it was discovered that his colleagues disagreed with his conclusions and refused to approve the report's publication. One testified at the hearings: "I regard Mr. Wright as absolutely and completely incompetent for any engineering work".

Governor Broward ran for the U.S. Senate in 1908 but lost. Broward and his predecessor, William Jennings, were paid by Richard Bolles to tour the state to promote drainage. Broward was elected to the Senate in 1910, but died before he could take office. He was eulogized across Florida for his leadership and progressive inspiration. Rapidly growing Fort Lauderdale paid him tribute by naming Broward County after him (the town's original plan had been to name it Everglades County). Land in the Everglades was being sold for $15 an acre a month after Broward died. Meanwhile, Henry Flagler continued to build railway stations at towns as soon as the populations warranted them. News of the Panama Canal inspired him to connect his rail line to the closest deep water port. Biscayne Bay was too shallow, so Flagler sent railway scouts to explore the possibility of building the line through to the tip of mainland Florida. The scouts reported that not enough land was present to build through the Everglades, so Flagler instead changed the plan to build to Key West in 1912.

== Boom and plume harvesting ==
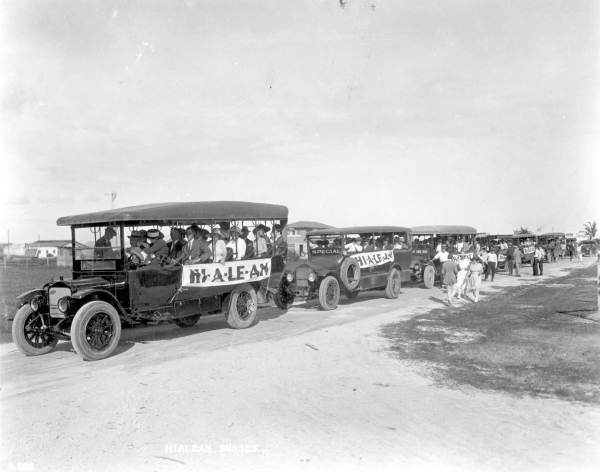
A group of tour buses leads prospective buyers to newly drained lots in Hialeah in 1921

Real estate companies continued to advertise and sell land along newly dug canals. In April 1912—the end of the dry season—reporters from all over the U.S. were given a tour of what had recently been drained, and they returned to their papers and raved about the progress. Land developers sold 20,000 lots in a few months. But as news about the Wright report continued to be negative, land values plummeted, and sales decreased. Developers were sued and arrested for mail fraud when people who had spent their life savings to buy land arrived in south Florida expecting to find a dry parcel of land to build upon and instead found it completely underwater. Advertisements promised land that would yield crops in eight weeks, but for many it took at least as long just to clear. Some burned off the sawgrass or other vegetation only to discover that the underlying peat continued to burn. Animals and tractors used for plowing got mired in the muck and were useless. When the muck dried, it turned to a fine black powder and created dust storms. Settlers encountered rodents, skinks, and biting insects, and faced dangers from mosquitoes, poisonous snakes and alligators. Though at first crops sprouted quickly and lushly, they just as quickly wilted and died, seemingly without reason. It was discovered later that the peat and muck lacked copper and other trace elements. The USDA released a pamphlet in 1915 that declared land along the New River Canal would be too costly to keep drained and fertilized; people in Ft. Lauderdale responded by collecting all of the pamphlets and burning them.

With the increasing population in towns near the Everglades came hunting opportunities. Even decades earlier, Harriet Beecher Stowe had been horrified at the hunting by visitors, and she wrote the first conservation publication for Florida in 1877: "[t]he decks of boats are crowded with men, whose only feeling amid our magnificent forests, seems to be a wild desire to shoot something and who fire at every living thing on shore." Otters and raccoons were the most widely hunted for their skins. Otter pelts could fetch between $8 and $15 each. Raccoons, more plentiful, only warranted 75 cents each in 1915 ($23.87 in 2025). Hunting often went unchecked; on a single trip, one Lake Okeechobee hunter killed 250 alligators and 172 otters.

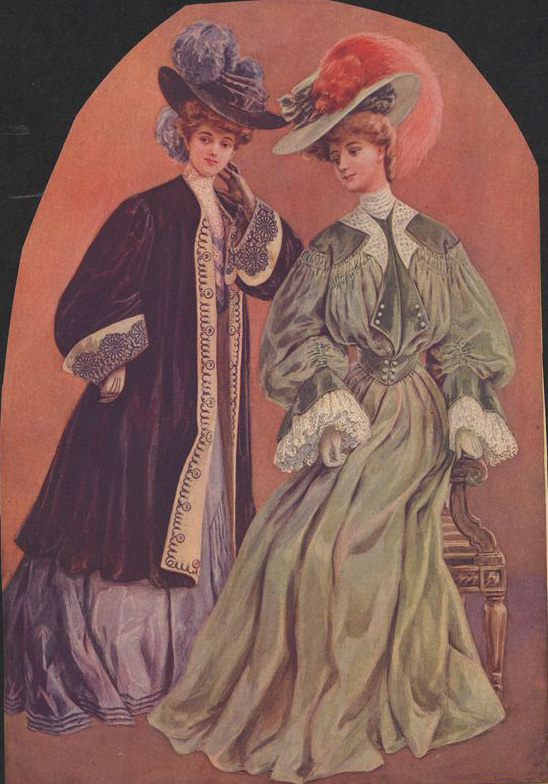
A 1904 magazine cutout showing the plumes for women's hats that were harvested from wading birds in the Everglades

Wading birds were a particular target. Their feathers were used in women's hats from the late 19th century until the 1920s. In 1886, five million birds were estimated to have been killed for their feathers. They were usually shot in the spring, when their feathers were colored for mating and nesting. Aigrettes, as the plumes were called in the millinery business, sold in 1915 for $32 an ounce, also the price of gold. Millinery was a $17-million-a-year industry that motivated plume harvesters to lie in wait at the nests of egrets and other large birds during the nesting season, shoot the parents with small-bore rifles, and leave the chicks to starve. Many hunters refused to participate after watching the gruesome results of a plume hunt. Still, plumes from Everglades wading birds could be found in Havana, New York City, London, and Paris. A dealer in New York paid at least 60 hunters to provide him with "almost anything that wore feathers, but particularly the Herons, Spoonbills, and showy birds". Hunters could collect plumes from a hundred birds on a good day.

Plume harvesting became a dangerous business. The Audubon Society became concerned with the amount of hunting being done in rookeries in the mangrove forests. In 1902, they hired a warden, Guy Bradley, to watch the rookeries around Cuthbert Lake. Bradley had lived in Flamingo within the Everglades, and was murdered in 1905 by one of his neighbors after he tried to prevent him from hunting. Protection of birds was the reason for establishing the first wildlife refuge when President Theodore Roosevelt set Pelican Island as a sanctuary in 1903.

In the 1920s, after birds were protected and alligators hunted nearly to extinction, Prohibition created a living for those willing to smuggle alcohol into the U.S. from Cuba. Rum-runners used the vast Everglades as a hiding spot: there were never enough law enforcement officers to patrol it. The advent of the fishing industry, the arrival of the railroad, and the discovery of the benefits of adding copper to Okeechobee muck soon created unprecedented numbers of residents in new towns like Moore Haven, Clewiston, and Belle Glade. By 1921, 2,000 people lived in 16 new towns around Lake Okeechobee. Sugarcane became the primary crop grown in south Florida and it began to be mass-produced. Miami experienced a second real estate boom that earned a developer in Coral Gables $150 million and saw undeveloped land north of Miami sell for $30,600 an acre. Miami became cosmopolitan and experienced a renaissance of architecture and culture. Hollywood movie stars vacationed in the area and industrialists built lavish homes. Miami's population multiplied fivefold, and Ft. Lauderdale and Palm Beach grew many times over as well. In 1925, Miami newspapers published editions weighing over 7 pounds (3.2 kg), most of it real estate advertising. Waterfront property was the most highly valued. Mangrove trees were cut down and replaced with palm trees to improve the view. Acres of south Florida slash pine were taken down, some for lumber, but the wood was found to be dense and it split apart when nails were driven into it. It was also termite-resistant, but homes were needed quickly. Most of the pine forests in Dade County were cleared for development.

== Hurricanes ==
The canals proposed by Wright were unsuccessful in making the lands south of Lake Okeechobee fulfill the promises made by real estate developers to local farmers. The winter of 1922 was unseasonably wet and the region was underwater. The town of Moore Haven received 46 inches (1,200 mm) of rain in six weeks in 1924. Engineers were pressured to regulate the water flow, not only for farmers but also for commercial fishers, who often requested conflicting water levels in the lake. Fred Elliot, who was in charge of building the canals after James Wright retired, commented: "A man on one side of the canal wants it raised for his particular use and a man on the other side wants it lowered for his particular use".

=== 1926 Miami Hurricane ===
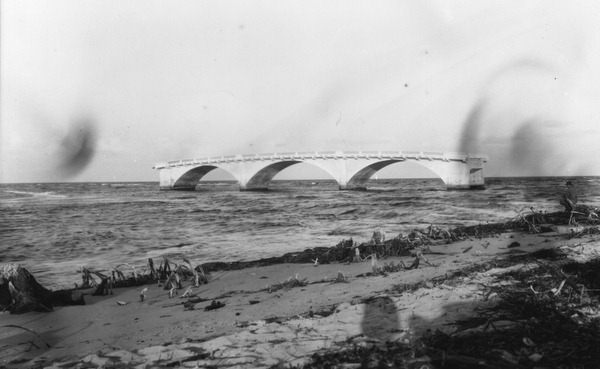
Remains of a bridge damaged during the 1926 Miami Hurricane.

The 1920s brought several favorable conditions that helped the land and population boom, one of which was an absence of any severe storms. The last severe hurricane, in 1906, had struck the Florida Keys. Many homes were constructed hastily and poorly as a result of this lull in storms. However, on September 18, 1926, a storm that became known as the 1926 Miami Hurricane struck with winds over 140 miles per hour (230 km/h), and caused massive devastation. The storm surge was as high as 15 feet (4.6 m) in some places. Henry Flagler's opulent Royal Palm Hotel was destroyed along with many other hotels and buildings. Most people who died did so when they ran out into the street in disbelief while the eye of the hurricane passed over, not knowing the wind was coming in from the other direction. "The lull lasted 35 minutes, and during that time the streets of the city became crowded with people", wrote Richard Gray, the local weather chief. "As a result, many lives were lost during the second phase of the storm." In Miami alone, 115 people were counted dead—although the true figure may have been as high as 175, because death totals were racially segregated. More than 25,000 people were homeless in the city. The town of Moore Haven, bordering Lake Okeechobee, was hardest hit. A levee built of muck collapsed, drowning almost 400 of the town's entire 1,200 residents. The tops of Lake Okeechobee levees were only 18 to 24 inches (46 to 61 cm) above the lake itself and the engineers were aware of the danger. Two days before the hurricane, an engineer predicted, "[i]f we have a blow, even a gale, Moore Haven is going under water". The engineer lost his wife and daughter in the flood.

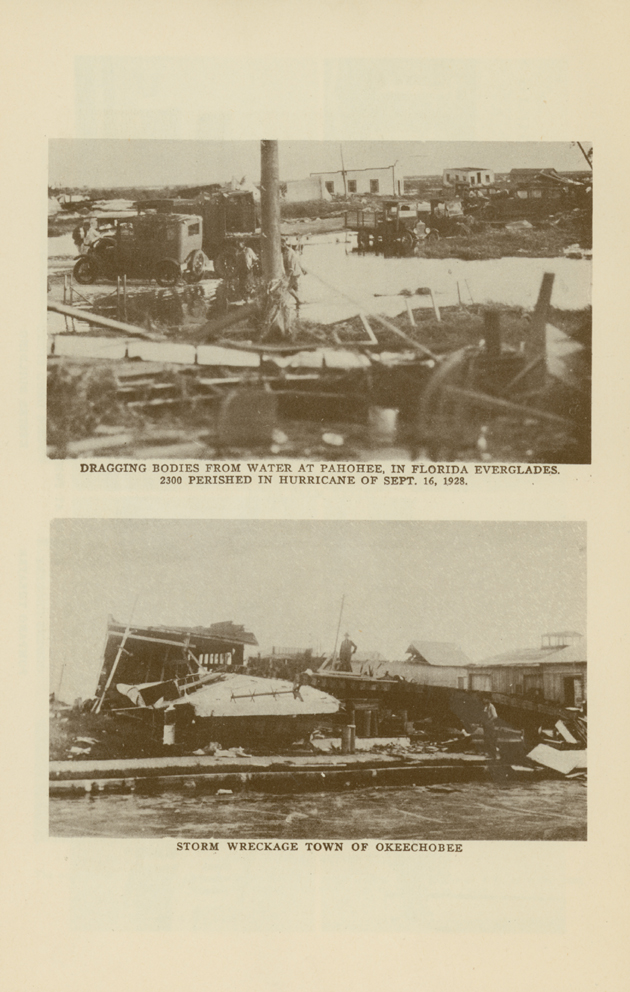
Pictures of the destruction in the town of Okeechobee in 1928

The City of Miami responded to the hurricane by downplaying its effects and turning down aid. The Miami Herald declared two weeks after the storm that almost everything in the city had returned to normal. The governor supported the efforts to minimize the appearance of the destruction by refusing to call a special legislative session to appropriate emergency funds for relief. As a result, the American Red Cross was able to collect only $3 million of $5 million needed. The 1926 hurricane effectively ended the land boom in Miami, despite the attempts at hiding the effects. It also forced drainage commissioners to re-evaluate the effectiveness of the canals. A $20 million plan to build a dike around Lake Okeechobee, to be paid by property taxes, was turned down after a skeptical constituency sued to stop it; more than $14 million had been spent on canals and they were ineffective in taking away excess water or delivering it when needed.

=== 1928 Okeechobee Hurricane ===
The weather was unremarkable for two years. In 1928, construction was completed on the Tamiami Trail, named because it was the only road spanning between Tampa and Miami. The builders attempted to construct the road several times before they blasted the muck down to the limestone, filled it with rock and paved over it. Hard rains in the summer caused Lake Okeechobee to rise several feet; this was noticed by a local newspaper editor who demanded it be lowered. However, on September 16, 1928, came a massive storm, now known as the 1928 Okeechobee Hurricane. Thousands drowned when Lake Okeechobee breached its levees; the range of estimates of the dead spanned from 1,770 (according to the Red Cross) to 3,000 or more. Many were swept away and never recovered. The majority of the dead were black migrant workers who had recently settled in or near Belle Glade. The catastrophe made national news, and although the governor again refused aid, after he toured the area and counted 126 bodies still unburied or uncollected a week after the storm, he activated the National Guard to assist in the cleanup, and declared in a telegram: "Without exaggeration, the situation in the storm area beggars description".

=== Herbert Hoover Dike ===
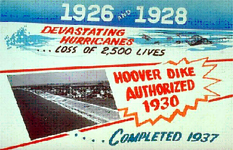
A sign advertising the completion of the Herbert Hoover Dike

The focus of government agencies quickly shifted to the control of floods rather than drainage. The Okeechobee Flood Control District, financed by both state and federal funds, was created in 1929. President Herbert Hoover toured the towns affected by the 1928 Okeechobee Hurricane and, an engineer himself, ordered the Army Corps of Engineers to assist the communities surrounding the lake. Between 1930 and 1937, a dike 66 miles (106 km) long was built around the southern edge of the lake, and a shorter one around the northern edge. It was 34 feet (10 m) tall and 3.5 feet (1.1 m) thick on the lake side, 3 feet (0.91 m) thick on the top, and 2 feet (0.61 m) thick toward land. Control of the Hoover Dike and the waters of Lake Okeechobee were delegated to federal powers: the United States declared legal limits of the lake to be 14 feet (4.3 m) and 17 feet (5.2 m).

A massive canal 80 feet (24 m) wide and 6 feet (1.8 m) deep was also dug through the Caloosahatchee River; when the lake rose too high, the excess water left through the canal to the Gulf of Mexico. Exotic trees were planted along the north shore levee: Australian pines, Australian oaks, willows, and bamboo. More than $20 million was spent on the entire project. Sugarcane production soared after the dike and canal were built. The populations of the small towns surrounding the lake jumped from 3,000 to 9,000 after World War II.

== Drought ==
The effects of the Hoover Dike were seen immediately. An extended drought occurred in the 1930s, and with the wall preventing water leaving Lake Okeechobee and canals and ditches removing other water, the Everglades became parched. Peat turned to dust, and salty ocean water entered Miami's wells. When the city brought in an expert to investigate, he discovered that the water in the Everglades was the area's groundwater—here, it appeared on the surface. Draining the Everglades removed this groundwater, which was replaced by ocean water seeping into the area's wells. In 1939, 1 million acres (4,000 km^{2}) of Everglades burned, and the black clouds of peat and sawgrass fires hung over Miami. Underground peat fires burned roots of trees and plants without burning the plants in some places. Scientists who took soil samples before draining had not taken into account that the organic composition of peat and muck in the Everglades was mixed with bacteria that added little to the process of decomposition underwater because they were not mixed with oxygen. As soon as the water was drained and oxygen mixed with the soil, the bacteria began to break down the soil. In some places, homes had to be moved on to stilts and 8 feet (2.4 m) of topsoil was lost.

=== Conservation attempts ===
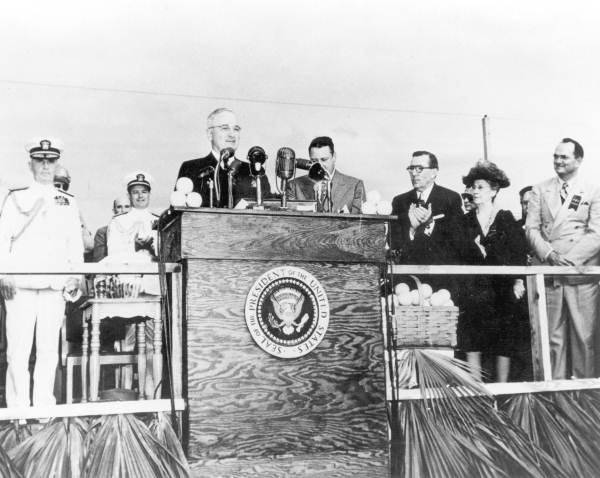
President Harry Truman dedicating Everglades National Park on December 6, 1947

Conservationists concerned about the Everglades have been a vocal minority ever since Miami was a young city. South Florida's first and perhaps most enthusiastic naturalist was Charles Torrey Simpson, who retired from the Smithsonian Institution to Miami in 1905 when he was 53. Nicknamed "the Sage of Biscayne Bay", Simpson wrote several books about tropical plant life around Miami. His backyard contained a tropical hardwood hammock, which he estimated he showed to about 50,000 people. Though he tended to avoid controversy regarding development, in Ornamental Gardening in Florida he wrote, "Mankind everywhere has an insane desire to waste and destroy the good and beautiful things this nature has lavished upon him".

Although the idea of protecting a portion of the Everglades arose in 1905, a crystallized effort was formed in 1928 when Miami landscape designer Ernest F. Coe established the Everglades Tropical National Park Association. It had enough support to be declared a national park by Congress in 1934, but there was not enough money during the Great Depression to buy the proposed 2,000,000 acres (8,100 km^{2}) for the park. It took another 13 years for it to be dedicated on December 6, 1947. One month before the dedication of the park, the former editor of The Miami Herald and freelance writer Marjory Stoneman Douglas published her first book, The Everglades: River of Grass. After researching the region for five years, she described the history and ecology of the south of Florida in great detail, characterizing the Everglades as a river instead of a stagnant swamp. Douglas later wrote, "My colleague Art Marshall said that with [the words "River of Grass"] I changed everybody's knowledge and educated the world as to what the Everglades meant". The last chapter was titled "The Eleventh Hour" and warned that the Everglades were approaching death, although the course could be reversed. Its first printing sold out a month after its release.

== Flood control ==
Coinciding with the dedication of Everglades National Park, 1947 in south Florida saw two hurricanes and a wet season responsible for 100 inches (250 cm) of rain, ending the decade-long drought. Although there were no human casualties, cattle and deer were drowned and standing water was left in suburban areas for months. Agricultural interests lost about $59 million. The embattled head of the Everglades Drainage District carried a gun for protection after being threatened.

=== Central and Southern Florida Flood Control Project ===
In 1948 Congress approved the Central and Southern Florida Project for Flood Control and Other Purposes (C&SF) and consolidated the Everglades Drainage District and the Okeechobee Flood Control District under this. The C&SF used four methods in flood management: levees, water storage areas, canal improvements, and large pumps to assist gravity. Between 1952 and 1954 in cooperation with the state of Florida it built a levee 100 miles (160 km) long between the eastern Everglades and suburbs from Palm Beach to Homestead, and blocked the flow of water into populated areas. Between 1954 and 1963 it divided the Everglades into basins. In the northern Everglades were Water Conservation Areas (WCAs), and the Everglades Agricultural Area (EAA) bordering to the south of Lake Okeechobee. In the southern Everglades was Everglades National Park. Levees and pumping stations bordered each WCA, which released water in drier times and removed it and pumped it to the ocean or Gulf of Mexico in times of flood. The WCAs took up about 37 percent of the original Everglades.

During the 1950s and 1960s the South Florida metropolitan area grew four times as fast as the rest of the nation. Between 1940 and 1965, 6 million people moved to south Florida: 1,000 people moved to Miami every week. Urban development between the mid-1950s and the late 1960s quadrupled. Much of the water reclaimed from the Everglades was sent to newly developed areas. With metropolitan growth came urban problems associated with rapid expansion: traffic jams; school overcrowding; crime; overloaded sewage treatment plants; and, for the first time in south Florida's urban history, water shortages in times of drought.

The C&SF constructed over 1,000 miles (1,600 km) of canals, and hundreds of pumping stations and levees within three decades. It produced a film, Waters of Destiny, characterized by author Michael Grunwald as propaganda, that likened nature to a villainous, shrieking force of rage and declared the C&SF's mission was to tame nature and make the Everglades useful. Everglades National Park management and Marjory Stoneman Douglas initially supported the C&SF, as it promised to maintain the Everglades and manage the water responsibly. However, an early report by the project reflected local attitudes about the Everglades as a priority to people in nearby developed areas: "The aesthetic appeal of the Park can never be as strong as the demands of home and livelihood. The manatee and the orchid mean something to people in an abstract way, but the former cannot line their purse, nor the latter fill their empty bellies."

Establishment of the C&SF made Everglades National Park completely dependent upon another political entity for its survival. One of the C&SF's projects was Levee 29, laid along the Tamiami Trail on the northern border of the park. Levee 29 featured four flood control gates that controlled all the water entering Everglades National Park; before construction, water flowed in through open drain pipes. The period from 1962 to 1965 was one of drought for the Everglades, and Levee 29 remained closed to allow the Biscayne Aquifer—the fresh water source for South Florida—to stay filled. Animals began to cross Tamiami Trail for the water held in WCA 3, and many were killed by cars. Biologists estimate the population of alligators in Everglades National Park was halved; otters nearly became extinct. The populations of wading birds had been reduced by 90 percent from the 1940s. When park management and the U.S. Department of the Interior asked the C&SF for assistance, the C&SF offered to build a levee along the southern border of Everglades National Park to retain waters that historically flowed through the mangroves and into Florida Bay. Though the C&SF refused to send the park more water, they constructed Canal 67, bordering the east side of the park and carrying excess water from Lake Okeechobee to the Atlantic.

=== Everglades Agricultural Area ===
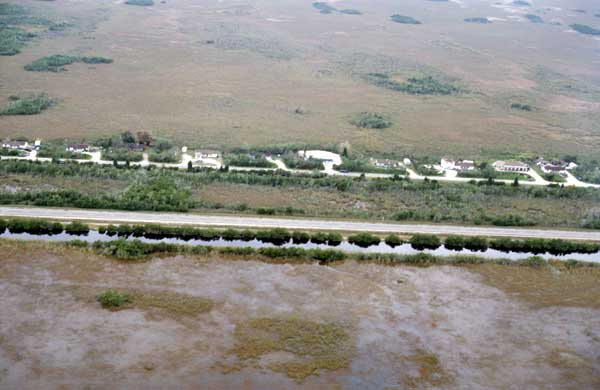
A 2003 U.S. Geological Survey photo showing the border between Water Conservation Area 3 (bottom) with water, and Everglades National Park, dry (top)

The C&SF established 470,000 acres (1,900 km^{2}) for the Everglades Agricultural Area—27 percent of the Everglades before development. In the late 1920s, agricultural experiments indicated that adding large amounts of manganese sulfate to Everglades muck produced profitable vegetable harvests. Adding 100 pounds (45 kg) of the compound was more cost effective than adding 1 short ton (0.91 t) of manure. The primary cash crop in the EAA is sugarcane, though sod, beans, lettuce, celery, and rice are also grown. Sugarcane became more consolidated an industry than did any other crop; in 1940 the coalition of farms was renamed U.S. Sugar and this produced 86 percent of Everglades sugar. During the 1930s the sugarcane farmers' coalition came under investigation for labor practices that bordered on slavery. Potential employees—primarily young black men—were lured from all over the U.S. by the promise of jobs, but they were held financially responsible for training, transportation, room and board and other costs. Quitting while debts were owed was punishable with jail time. By 1942, U.S. Sugar was indicted for peonage in federal court, though the charges were eventually dismissed on a technicality. U.S. Sugar benefited significantly from the U.S. embargo on Cuban goods beginning in the early 1960s. In 1958, before the Castro regime, 47,000 acres (190 km^{2}) of sugarcane were harvested in Florida; by the 1964–1965 season, 228,000 acres (920 km^{2}) were harvested. From 1959 to 1962 the region went from two sugar mills to six, one of which in Belle Glade set several world records for sugar production.

Fields in the EAA are typically 40 acres (16 ha), on two sides bordered by canals that are connected to larger ones by which water is pumped in or out depending on the needs of the crops. The water level for sugarcane is ideally maintained at 20 inches (51 cm) below the surface soil, and after the cane is harvested, the stalks are burned. Vegetables require more fertilizer than sugarcane, though the fields may resemble the historic hydrology of the Everglades by being flooded in the wet season. Sugarcane, however, requires water in the dry season. The fertilizers used on vegetables, along with high concentrations of nitrogen and phosphorus that are the by-product of decayed soil necessary for sugarcane production, were pumped into WCAs south of the EAA, predominantly to Everglades National Park. The introduction of large amounts of these let exotic plants take hold in the Everglades. One of the defining characteristics of natural Everglades ecology is its ability to support itself in a nutrient-poor environment, and the introduction of fertilizers began to change this ecology.

== Turning point ==
A turning point for development in the Everglades came in 1969 when a replacement airport was proposed as Miami International Airport outgrew its capacities. Developers began acquiring land, paying $180 an acre in 1968, and the Dade County Port Authority (DCPA) bought 39 square miles (100 km^{2}) in the Big Cypress Swamp without consulting the C&SF, management of Everglades National Park or the Department of the Interior. Park management learned of the official purchase and agreement to build the jetport from The Miami Herald the day it was announced. The DCPA bulldozed the land it had bought, and laid a single runway it declared was for training pilots. The new jetport was planned to be larger than O'Hare, Dulles, JFK, and LAX airports combined; the location chosen was 6 miles (9.7 km) north of the Everglades National Park, within WCA 3. The deputy director of the DCPA declared: "This is going to be one of the great population centers of America. We will do our best to meet our responsibilities and the responsibilities of all men to exercise dominion over the land, sea, and air above us as the higher order of man intends."

The C&SF brought the jetport proposal to national attention by mailing letters about it to 100 conservation groups in the U.S. Initial local press reaction condemned conservation groups who immediately opposed the project. Business Week reported real estate prices jumped from $200 to $800 an acre surrounding the planned location, and Life wrote of the expectations of the commercial interests in the area. The U.S. Geological Survey's study of the environmental impact of the jetport started, "Development of the proposed jetport and its attendant facilities ... will inexorably destroy the south Florida ecosystem and thus the Everglades National Park". The jetport was intended to support a community of a million people and employ 60,000. The DCPA director was reported in Time saying, "I'm more interested in people than alligators. This is the ideal place as far as aviation is concerned."

When studies indicated the proposed jetport would create 4,000,000 US gallons (15,000,000 L) of raw sewage a day and 10,000 short tons (9,100 t) of jet engine pollutants a year, the national media snapped to attention. Science magazine wrote, in a series on environmental protection highlighting the jetport project, "Environmental scientists have become increasingly aware that, without careful planning, development of a region and the conservation of its natural resources do not go hand in hand". The New York Times called it a "blueprint for disaster", and Wisconsin senator Gaylord Nelson wrote to President Richard Nixon voicing his opposition: "It is a test of whether or not we are really committed in this country to protecting our environment." Governor Claude Kirk withdrew his support for the project, and the 78-year-old Marjory Stoneman Douglas was persuaded to go on tour to give hundreds of speeches against it. She established Friends of the Everglades and encouraged more than 3,000 members to join. Initially the U.S. Department of Transportation pledged funds to support the jetport, but after pressure, Nixon overruled the department. He instead established Big Cypress National Preserve, announcing it in the Special Message to the Congress Outlining the 1972 Environmental Program. Following the jetport proposition, restoration of the Everglades became not only a statewide priority, but an international one as well. In the 1970s the Everglades were declared an International Biosphere Reserve and a World Heritage Site by UNESCO, and a Wetland of International Importance by the Ramsar Convention, making it one of only three locations on Earth that have appeared on all three lists.

== See also ==
- Agriculture in Florida
- Environmental issues in Florida
- Indigenous people of the Everglades region
- Seminole
- History of Miami, Florida
- Restoration of the Everglades
- Swamp Land Act of 1850
- Clean Water Act (1972)
- North American Wetlands Conservation Act (1989)
- List of canals in the United States#Irrigation, industrial and drainage canals

== Bibliography ==
- Barnett, Cynthia (2007). Mirage: Florida and the Vanishing Water of the Eastern U.S.. Ann Arbor: University of Michigan Press. ISBN 0-472-11563-4
- Carter, W. Hodding (2004). Stolen Water: Saving the Everglades from its Friends, Foes, and Florida. Atria Books. ISBN 0-7434-7407-4
- Caulfield, Patricia (1970) Everglades. New York: Sierra Club / Ballantine Books.
- Douglas, Marjory (1947). The Everglades: River of Grass. R. Bemis Publishing, Ltd. ISBN 0-912451-44-0
- Douglas, Marjory; Rothchild, John (1987). Marjory Stoneman Douglas: Voice of the River. Pineapple Press. ISBN 0-910923-33-7
- Grunwald, Michael (2006). The Swamp: The Everglades, Florida, and the Politics of Paradise. New York: Simon & Schuster. ISBN 0-7432-5107-5
- Lodge, Thomas E. (1994). The Everglades Handbook: Understanding the Ecosystem. CRC Press. ISBN 1-56670-614-9
- McCally, David (1999). The Everglades: An Environmental History. Gainesville: University Press of Florida. Available as an etext; Boulder, Colo.: NetLibrary, 2001. ISBN 0-8130-2302-5
- Tebeau, Charlton (1968). Man in the Everglades: 2000 Years of Human History in the Everglades National Park. Coral Gables: University of Miami Press.
