= Harvey Eugene Oyer III =

American author and attorney

Harvey Oyer III
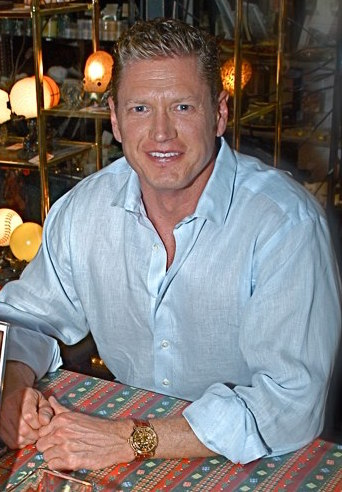
- Born: Boynton Beach, Florida
- Education: J.D., University of Florida, M. Phil, Cambridge University, B.A. University of Florida
- Occupations: Author and Attorney
- Notable work: The Adventures of Charlie Pierce children's book series

Harvey Eugene Oyer III (born April 5, 1968) is an American author and attorney from West Palm Beach, Florida. Oyer is best known for his award-winning children's book series The Adventures of Charlie Pierce.

== Early life and education ==
Oyer was born in Boynton Beach, Florida, to Harvey Eugene Oyer Jr., a former Boynton Beach mayor, and Linda Eve Oyer. A fifth-generation Floridian, Oyer is the great-great grandson of pioneer settler Captain Hannibal Dillingham Pierce. Pierce who was one of the first non-Native Americans to settle in Southeast Florida, arriving in 1872 from Chicago, Illinois with wife and son Charles.

Pierce was one of several early settlers who planted thousands of coconuts salvaged from the Providencia Spanish shipwreck off of Palm Beach, Florida in January 1878. The resulting coconut palm groves eventually gave Palm Beach, West Palm Beach, and Palm Beach County their respective names. Oyer's great grandmother, Lillie Pierce Voss, was the first child of European descent born between Jupiter and Miami. She was inducted into the Florida Women's Hall of Fame in 2013. Oyer is the great-grandnephew of Charles William Pierce, for whom Oyer's children's book series is named. Charles William Pierce was elected a Great Floridian in 2009.

Oyer attended the University of Florida, where he graduated with a Bachelor of Arts degree in Economics with high honors, was elected to Phi Beta Kappa, and was selected as the Most Outstanding Male Leader in the Class of 1990. Oyer was awarded a Rotary Ambassadorial Scholarship and studied graduate economics at the Australian National University in Canberra, Australia. Oyer continued his studies earning a Master of Philosophy in Archaeology from the University of Cambridge in England. He returned to the University of Florida and earned a Juris Doctor, with honors, from the College of Law. He was admitted to the Florida Bar in 1998.

== Career ==
=== Military Service ===
Oyer served in the United States Marine Corps, attaining the rank of captain.

=== Attorney ===
Oyer is a land use, zoning, and real estate attorney in West Palm Beach, Florida

=== Writing ===
Oyer has written or contributed to a number of books and articles, predominantly about Florida and its history. His most well-known books are the children's book series, The Adventures of Charlie Pierce. The five-book series includes the titles, The American Jungle, (2008), The Last Egret, (2010), The Last Calusa, (2012), The Barefoot Mailman, (2015), and Charlie and the Tycoon, (2016). His books have won numerous awards and have sold over 300,000 copies in Florida.

=== Public Speaker ===
Oyer is a lecturer who regularly presents lectures about Florida and its history. He served as an adjunct professor of law at the University of Miami School of Law and an adjunct professor of political science at the Florida Atlantic University Honors College. He has been a guest lecturer at a number of schools and universities, including Palm Beach Atlantic University and Vanderbilt University Law School. Oyer has presented to numerous elementary school classrooms around Florida to help schoolchildren appreciate Florida's unique history.

=== Historic Preservation ===
In 2024, Oyer is helping to promote the restoration of the Harriet Himmel theatre in West Palm Beach's CityPlace shopping and residential district. In the early to mid-2000s, Oyer spearheaded the project to save and restore the historic 1916 Palm Beach County Courthouse, which was to be demolished. Subsequently, Oyer helped to create the Richard and Pat Johnson Palm Beach County History Museum in the restored Courthouse building. In the early 2000s, he led efforts to restore the famed Worth Avenue in Palm Beach.

=== Adventure Exploration ===
A member of the famed Explorers Club, Oyer in 2022 led a team of explorers and a scientist across the Florida Everglades in canoes from the Gulf of Mexico to the Atlantic Ocean, retracing the 1897 Everglades crossing of explorer Hugh L. Willoughby. In 1897, Willoughby tested the waters of the Everglades for a number of contaminants, which provided the baseline water chemistry of the Florida Everglades. Oyer’s 2022 expedition, carrying the Explorers Club flag, followed Willoughby’s route 130 miles through dense and remote sawgrass and mangrove swamps, a feat that had not been successfully completed in the 125 years since Willoughby accomplished it. Oyer’s team collected water samples in the same locations that Willoughby had 125 years earlier and tested for the same contaminants as well as PFAS substances, microplastics, and antibiotic-resistant genes.

Oyer also participated in Explorers Club flagged expeditions to the remote highlands of Papua, New Guinea and performed underwater surveys of portions of the Bahama Islands. In 2018, Oyer and four other men cross-country skied to the North Pole.

=== Board Memberships ===
Oyer has held several chair and board positions on local and statewide boards.

On the local level, Oyer served for seven terms as the Chairman of the Historical Society of Palm Beach County. He was the 100th Chairman of the Chamber of Commerce of the Palm Beaches, two-time Chairman of the Business Development Board of Palm Beach County, and President of the Forum Club of the Palm Beaches.

He has served as a board member of the Cox Science Center and Aquarium, United Way of Palm Beach County, Palm Beach State College Foundation, the Ann Norton Sculpture Garden, American Red Cross of Palm Beach County, and the Palm Beach County Education Commission.

On a statewide level, he has served on the board of the Florida Historical Society and the Florida Supreme Court Historical Society.

== Honors and awards ==
Oyer has been awarded the Ellis Island Medal of Honor, the Thomas Jefferson Award for Public Service, the National Daughters of the American Revolution National Community Service Award, and was named one of the 100 Most Influential Floridians by Florida International magazine and a Legend of Palm Beach by Palm Beach Illustrated magazine. Oyer has been listed multiple times in the Florida 500 list of the most influential leaders in Florida by Florida Trend magazine.”

In 2013, Oyer was named the Florida Distinguished Author by the Florida House in Washington, D.C.

In 2023, Oyer was elected to the Academy of Golden Gators by the University of Florida where he was already a member of the Student Hall of Fame.
