= Harvey Eugene Oyer Jr. =

Harvey Eugene Oyer Jr. (March 31, 1926 – December 18, 2010) was a businessman and civic leader who served as Mayor of Boynton Beach, Florida. He was known widely as “Mr. Boynton Beach”.

== Early life and family ==
Harvey Oyer was born at home in Boynton Beach, Florida, the son of Harvey E. Oyer and Lillian Frederica “Freda” Voss Oyer. A fourth generation Floridian, Oyer was the great grandson of pioneer settler Captain Hannibal Dillingham Pierce, who was one of the first non-Native Americans to settle in Southeast Florida, arriving in 1872. Pierce was one of several early settlers who planted thousands of coconuts salvaged from a Spanish shipwreck in 1878. The resulting acres of coconut palms eventually provided Palm Beach, West Palm Beach, and Palm Beach County with their respective names. Oyer was the grandson of Lillie Pierce Voss, the first white child born between Jupiter and Miami, an area that now has approximately six million people. She was inducted into the Florida Women's Hall of Fame in 2013. He was the grand nephew of Charles W. Pierce, who was elected a Great Floridian in 2009. Oyer gave the acceptance speech when Florida Governor Charlie Crist presented Pierce for induction as a Great Floridian. Oyer’s son, Harvey Eugene Oyer III, is the author of a best-selling children’s book series about Pierce, entitled The Adventures of Charlie Pierce.

== Military and civic life ==
Oyer served in the United States Army in the South Pacific during World War II and in Europe during the Korean War. He retired from the U.S. Army Reserve with the rank of lieutenant colonel.

Oyer was elected to the Boynton Beach City Council in 1957 and was elected mayor in 1960 at the age of 34. He served in many civic leadership roles, including as President of the Boynton Beach Chamber of Commerce, the Boynton Beach Kiwanis Club, and the Boynton Beach Historical Society.

== Honors ==
The City of Boynton Beach named a waterfront park along the Intracoastal Waterway and US-1 “Harvey E. Oyer Jr. Park” in 2011. The City of Boynton Beach student scholarship program was renamed in Oyer’s honor in 2011. The Boynton Beach Chamber of Commerce created the Harvey Oyer Community Involvement and Corporate Citizenship Award in 2014.
