= Stuart McIver =

American journalist

Stuart Betts McIver (December 25, 1921 – April 24, 2008) was a historian and author of 14 books as well as numerous magazine and newspaper articles. Much of his written work related to Florida including Touched by the Sun (Florida Chronicles) and Death in the Everglades about the murder of conservation pioneer Guy Bradley. He was also a scriptwriter and director of documentary films. He appeared as himself in City Confidential, Season 1, Episode 12 "Ft. Lauderdale: Sin in the Sun". He served six years on the board of the Broward County Historical Commission.

McIver was born on December 25, 1921, in Sanford, North Carolina, where his father was a country doctor. He studied journalism at the University of North Carolina and started his career writing for newspapers at The Greensboro Daily News, Charlotte News and Baltimore Sun.

He wrote for Gold Coast, Florida Sportsman, Boca Raton, and South Florida magazines. He received awards from the Florida Historical Society, Florida Historical Confederation, Broward County Historical Commission and Fort Lauderdale Historical Society. He served as editor of the Historical Association of Southern Florida and the Caribbean's South Florida History Magazine.

== Personal life ==
He met his wife at the Sun in 1948. The couple moved from Maryland to Jupiter, Florida in 1962, and later to Broward County in 1969.

At the Sun Sentinel he wrote a Sunday column titled "The Way We Were" for 15 years. McIver was fond of the Florida Everglades where he hiked, canoed and camped.

== Bibliography ==
- Death in the Everglades: The Murder of Guy Bradley, America's First Martyr to Environmentalism. Gainesville, FL: University Press of Florida, 2003. ISBN 0-8130-2671-7.
- Touched by the Sun 3 Volumes (2001)
- William J. Ridings Jr., and Stuart B. McIver. Rating the Presidents: A Ranking of U.S. leaders, from the Great and Honorable to the Dishonest and Incompetent (2000, ISBN 0-8065-2151-1)
- (19 September 1993). "1926 Miami: The blow that broke the boom". South Florida Sun-Sentinel. Retrieved 21 June 2008.
- Dreamers, Schemers and Scalawags. Sarasota, Florida: Pineapple Press Inc., (1998. ISBN 978-1-56164-155-0) (1994. ISBN 978-1-56164-155-0)
- Hemingway's Key West
- One Hundred Years on Biscayne Bay. Coconut Grove, FL: Biscayne Bay Yacht Club, 1987.
- Yesterday's Palm Beach, E. A. Seemann, Miami (1976) part of the Seemann's Historic Cities Series
- The Book Lover's Guide to Florida, co-author (1992)
- Glimpses of South Florida History (1988)
- Coral Springs; The first twenty-five years (1988)

Fort Lauderdale and Broward County
