= Howard Ellis Cox Jr. =

American venture capitalist

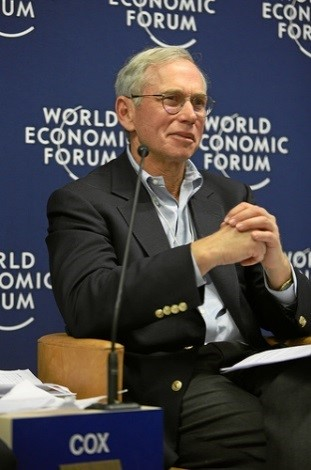
- Howard Ellis Cox, Jr. at the World Economic Forum Annual Meeting 2017
- Born: February 1, 1944 (age 82); New York, New York, U.S.
- Education: Princeton (BA); Columbia School of Law (JD); Harvard Business School (MBA)
- Occupation: Venture Capitalist

Howard Ellis Cox Jr. (born February 1, 1944) is an American venture capitalist and philanthropist. He has also been active in healthcare development and national security. He joined Greylock Partners in 1971 and is a special limited partner. He is on the Executive Committee of In-Q-Tel.

== Early life and education ==
Cox was born on February 1, 1944 to parents Howard Ellis Cox and Anne Crane Delafield (née Finch) in New York City. Cox's mother is related to Robert R. Livingston (1746-1813), one of the Founding Fathers of the United States, the first Secretary of Foreign Affairs, and later the United States Minister to France for negotiating The Louisiana Purchase.

He attended grade school at Allen-Stevenson and graduated from Collegiate School in New York City. He graduated from Princeton University in 1964, where he majored in the Woodrow Wilson School of Public and International Affairs. He graduated from Columbia Law School in 1967, and graduated from Harvard Business School in 1969.

His brother, Edward F. Cox, married Tricia Nixon, daughter of Richard Nixon, on June 12, 1971. Howard Cox was best man. Demonstrating a close degree of family connection to politics, his mother, father, and brother spent Christmas eve and day at the Whitehouse in 1971 together with the Eisenhower and Nixon families.

== Career ==
=== Investment career ===
Cox joined Greylock Partners in 1971, it was one of the first venture capital firms in the United States. It was based in Boston and more recently moved to Silicon Valley. He is currently a Special Limited Partner.

Cox is a former director of the investment firm Brown Advisory, an advisory trustee of a number of Fidelity Mutual Funds and director emeritus of Stryker Corporation.

Cox served on the board of three New York Stock Exchange Companies: Stryker, Centene, and Affiliated Publications (owner of the Boston Globe). He is a past chairman of the National Venture Capital Association.

=== National security career ===
Cox served in the Office of the Secretary of Defense (Systems Analysis). He joined the board of In-Q-Tel in 2000. He is a member of the Executive Committee and Chairs the Finance and Investment Committee, and serves on the boards of Business Executives for National Security and the Brookings Institution. Cox is a member of the Council on Foreign Relations and former member Secretary of Defense Business Board of Directors.

== Wealth and philanthropy ==
Howard Cox is reportedly a billionaire (as of 2012). He has been a significant donor to Republican super PACs. In 2017, he purchased a 2,900 square foot home in Westhampton Beach for $4 million.

In 2021, Cox donated $20 million to the South Florida Science Center and Aquarium and it was renamed the Cox Science Center and Aquarium.
