= Charlie W. Pierce =

American novelist

Charles William "Charlie" Pierce
- Born: July 16, 1864; Waukegan, Illinois, U.S.
- Died: July 10, 1939 (aged 74); Boynton, Florida, U.S.
- Resting place: Woodlawn Cemetery
- Occupations: Postmaster; Barefoot Mailman; Boat Captain; Author
- Spouses: Yallahs Wallack Pierce (1896–1922); Ethel Sims Pierce (1924–1939)
- Writing career
- Period: 1900–1939
- Genre: History
- Notable works: Pioneer Life in South Florida, 1970

Charles William Pierce (July 16, 1864 – July 10, 1939) was one of South Florida's most important pioneer citizens. Arriving in 1872, Pierce was a community leader in banking, seamanship, the postal service, and author of the sentinel book on early South Florida life.

== Early life ==
Charlie Pierce was the son of Hannibal Dillingham Pierce and Margretta Louise Moore. Born in Waukegan, Illinois, Pierce's family moved to Chicago. Pierce's uncle, William H. Moore, told the Pierce family of the warm Florida weather, and how he believed it would cure his developing tuberculosis. Hannibal Pierce purchased a sailing vessel (the Fairy Belle) for the family to sail down the Mississippi River towards Florida. Just as they were preparing for the trip, the Great Chicago Fire consumed most of the city, but not the Pierce boat. The family set sail and eventually moored at Cedar Key. Hannibal Pierce sold the boat and the family went by train and steamer to Sand Point (Titusville, Florida). They camped for several weeks on the Indian River until a fire destroyed their possessions. Hannibal Pierce then accepted a position as an assistant lighthouse keeper at the Jupiter Lighthouse.

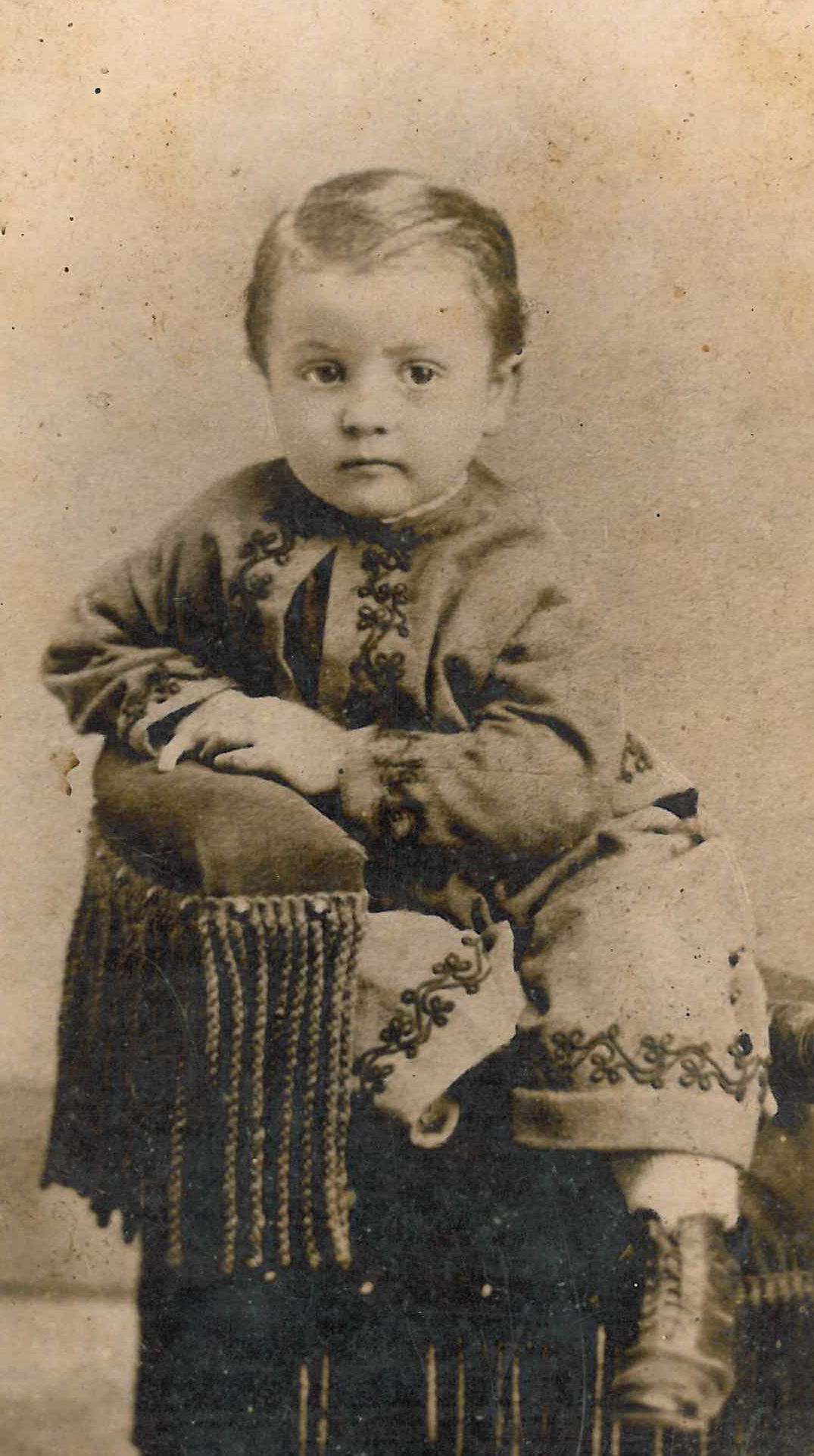
Charlie Pierce as a young boy.

== Pioneer life ==
After serving at the Jupiter Lighthouse for a year, Hannibal Pierce homesteaded a large portion of Hypoluxo Island, located in the Lake Worth Lagoon. At the time of their homestead claim, the island had no name. In conversations with the Seminole Indians, Hannibal Pierce learned that the name was Hypoluxo, which meant "water all around, no get out." Here the family built a house from driftwood and palmetto thatch. Hannibal Pierce became the keeper of the Orange Grove House of Refuge, in what would become Delray Beach. The United States federal government built five Houses of Refuge in Florida to care for shipwrecked sailors. It was at the House of Refuge that the first child of European descent was born, Lillie Pierce (Lillie Pierce Voss), in 1876. The Pierce family returned to its Hypoluxo Island homestead. Pierce led many expeditions through the Everglades on hunting and fishing trips, being one of the first to explore what would become Everglades National Park.

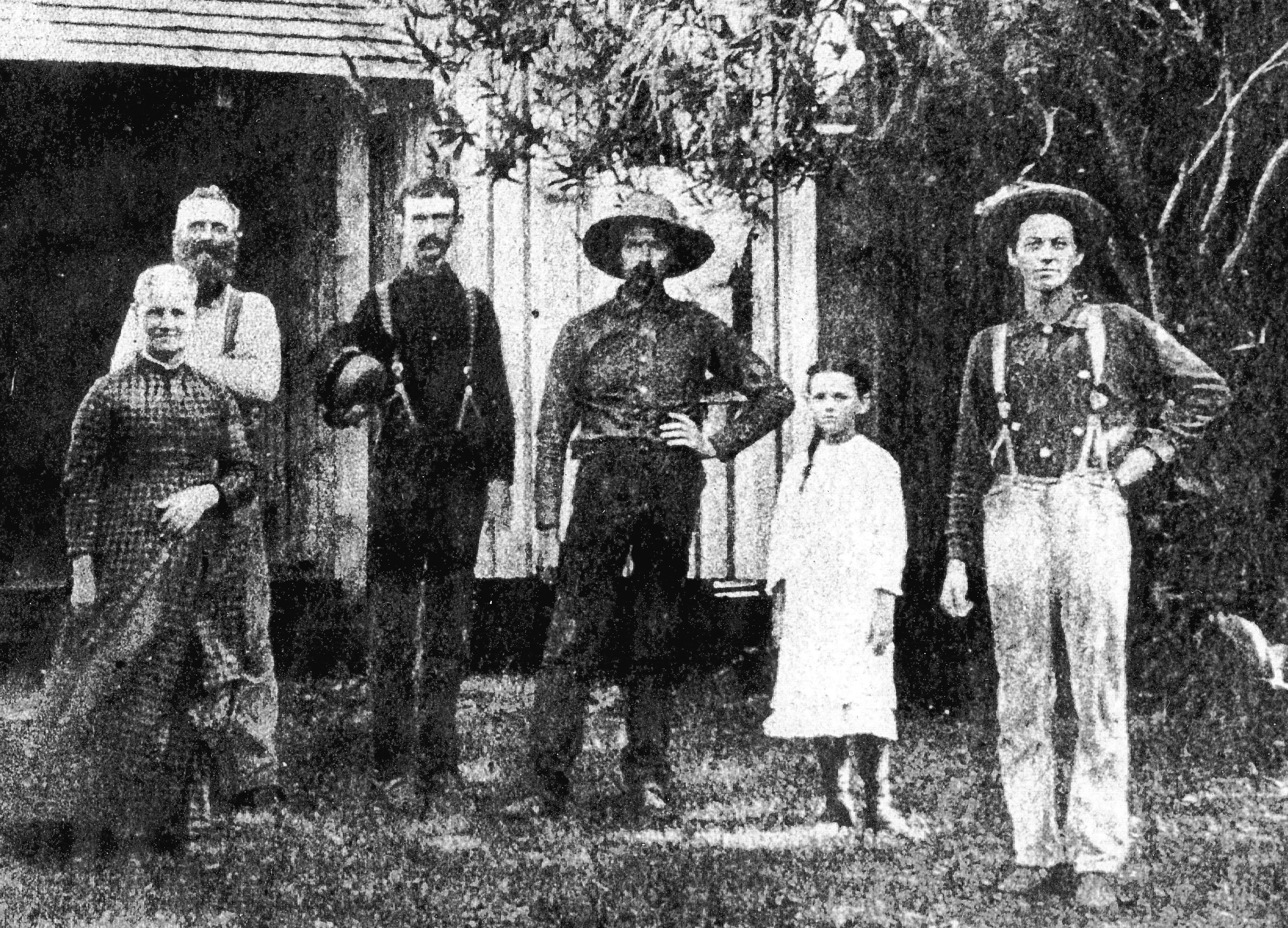
The Pierce Family in Hypoluxo, Florida

Pierce accompanied his boyhood friend Guy Bradley, Bradley's brother Louis and famed egret plume hunter Jean Chevalier aboard Pierce's boat the Bonton in 1885. The hunting party killed thousands of birds for their plumes, which were used to decorate women's hats. The egret plumes were worth more than their weight in gold.

== Career ==
Pierce began piloting boats through the inland route to Titusville, the main point of trade on the lower Florida east coast at that time. Pierce entered the U.S. Postal Service in 1886, starting as assistant postmaster at Hypoluxo. In 1888, he became one of the famed "Barefoot Mailmen" (a term he was the first to use, in 1939) who walked the beaches and crossed the rivers between Hypoluxo and Miami, a trek of over 60 miles (97 km). In 1893, Pierce began captaining the mail steamer "Hypoluxo" which delivered mail through the Lake Worth Region along the 22 miles (35 km) length of the inland waterway. Pierce also farmed tracts on Hypoluxo Island on his homestead. In 1895, Pierce moved to Boynton, Florida, where he had a dry goods store near the Florida East Coast railway station. In his store he also served as town postmaster, a career that spanned more than 30 years. He served from 1900 until 1903, then from 1908 until his passing in 1939. Pierce also served as president of the Bank of Boynton, and was one of the first masters of the Masonic Lodge in Boynton Beach.

== Personal life ==
Pierce married Yallahs Lizette Wallack on February 26, 1896, in Lemon City, Florida, north of Miami. They had one son, Charles Leon "Chuck" Pierce, the first boy of European descent born in Boynton Beach. Yallahs Pierce was the daughter of traveling entertainers Watty Wallack and Fannie Petersen Wallack. Yallahs Pierce died February 14, 1922. Pierce then married Ethel Sims August 16, 1924. Charlie Pierce died July 10, 1939, following a short illness; Charlie and Yallahs are interred at Woodlawn Cemetery in West Palm Beach.

== Memoir ==
Towards the end of his life, Pierce worked on a manuscript of his experiences and adventures in his Florida pioneer days. The 698-page work, titled "On the Wings of the World" remained unpublished for decades. In the 1960s, Judge James R. Knott, a prominent Palm Beach County historian, sought the help of Florida Atlantic University history professor Dr. Donald Walter Curl. Dr. Curl took the manuscript and added historical context to the masterpiece. The resulting book was "Pioneer Life in South Florida," heralded as an authoritative work on pioneer history in South Florida.

== Posthumous recognition ==
In 1981, the Florida Department of State and the Florida League of Cities created the Great Floridians program to recognize deceased individuals who made significant contributions to the state's history and culture. Charles Pierce is one of 89 Floridians given this great honor. His plaque is at the Oyer Building (site of the old Boynton Beach Post Office), 523–525 East Ocean Avenue, Boynton Beach, Florida

== Book series ==
In 2008, Pierce's great-grand nephew Harvey Oyer III, published a children's book based on Pierce's early Florida adventures. The American Jungle: The Adventures of Charlie Pierce became a standard reader for children in many Florida school districts, where Florida history is an integral part of the fourth grade curriculum. The book's popularity resulted in subsequent books in the series, including The Last Egret, The Last Calusa and The Barefoot Mailman.
