= Guy Bradley =

American game warden and deputy sheriff (1870–1905)

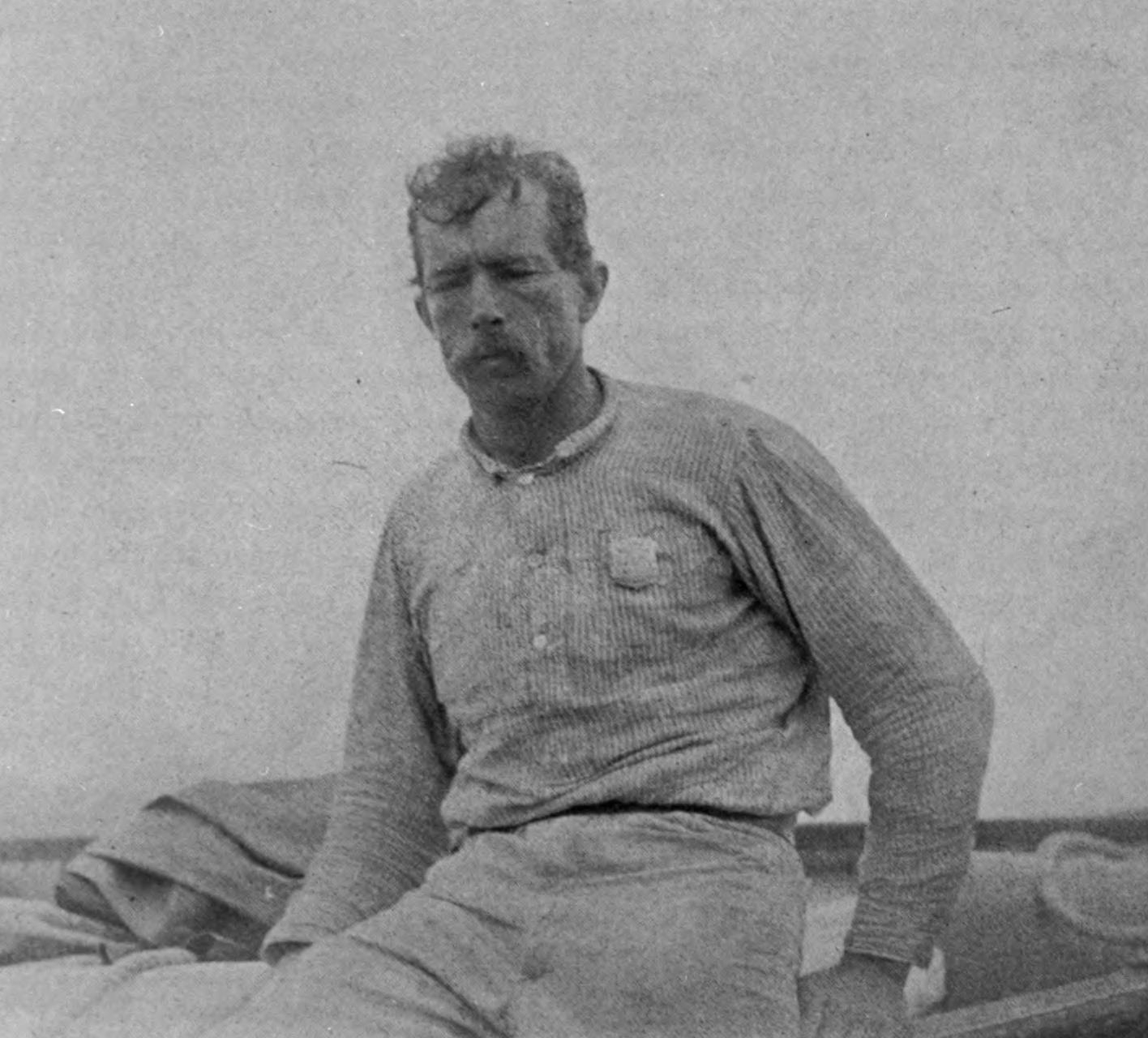
- Bradley, his deputy's badge visible on the left side of his chest
- Born: Guy Morrell Bradley; April 25, 1870; Chicago, Illinois, US
- Died: July 8, 1905 (aged 35); Flamingo, Monroe County, Florida, US
- Occupations: Game warden; deputy sheriff

Guy Morrell Bradley (April 25, 1870 – July 8, 1905) was an American game warden and deputy sheriff for Monroe County, Florida. Born in Chicago, Illinois, he relocated to Florida with his family when he was young. As a boy, he often served as guide to visiting fishermen and plume hunters, although he later denounced poaching after legislation was passed to protect the dwindling number of birds. In 1902, Bradley was hired by the American Ornithologists' Union, at the request of the Florida Audubon Society, to become one of the country's first game wardens.

Tasked with protecting the area's wading birds from hunters, he patrolled the area stretching from Florida's west coast, through the Everglades, to Key West, single-handedly enforcing the ban on bird hunting. Bradley was shot and killed in the line of duty, after confronting a man and his two sons who were hunting egrets in the Everglades. His much-publicized death at the age of 35 galvanized conservationists and served as inspiration for future legislation to protect Florida's bird populations. Several national awards and places have been named in his honor.

== Early life ==
Bradley was born in Chicago, Illinois, in 1870. His family had strong ties to the city; his father, Edwin Ruthven Bradley, was born there in 1840, and two members of the family held high positions in Chicago's law enforcement. Six years after Guy's birth, the family relocated to Florida. After making their home in smaller towns, the family eventually settled in Fort Lauderdale, where Edwin became keeper of the Fort Lauderdale House of Refuge. Shortly after the death of Bradley's sister Flora from an unknown illness—which also affected Guy, leaving him ill for several years—the family moved to the vicinity of Lake Worth. Edwin became a postman, earning an annual wage of six hundred dollars. He, with the help of his oldest son, later received national attention for being one of several barefoot mailmen, who operated until a road was constructed in 1892.

The family then relocated to Miami, where Edwin served as superintendent of the Dade County school district. In 1885, fifteen-year-old Guy and his older brother Louis served as scouts for noted French plume hunter Jean Chevalier on his trip to the Everglades. Accompanied by their friend Charlie W. Pierce, the men set sail on Pierce's craft, the Bonton, ending their journey in Key West. At the time, plume feathers—selling for more than $20 an ounce ($501 in 2011)—were reportedly more valuable than gold. On their expedition, which lasted several weeks, the young men and Chevalier's party killed 1,397 individual birds of thirty-six different species.

== Hunt for plumes ==
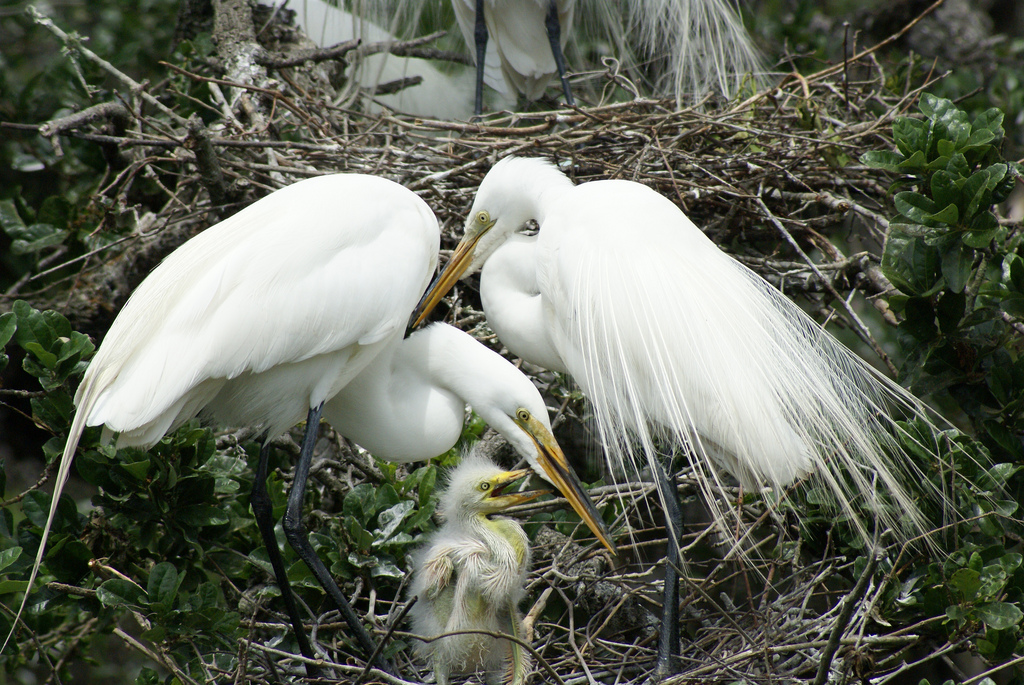
A great egret family; plume birds were often shot while sitting on their nests.

At the turn of the 20th century, vast numbers of birds were being killed in order to provide feathers to decorate women's hats. The fashion craze, which began in the 1870s, became so prominent that by 1886 birds were being killed for the millinery trade at a rate of five million a year; many species faced extinction as a result. In Florida, plume birds were first driven away from the most populated areas in the northern part of the state, and forced to nest further south. Rookeries concentrated in and around the Everglades area, which had abundant food and seasonal dry periods, ideal for nesting birds. By the late 1880s, there were no longer any large numbers of plume birds within reach of Florida's most settled cities.

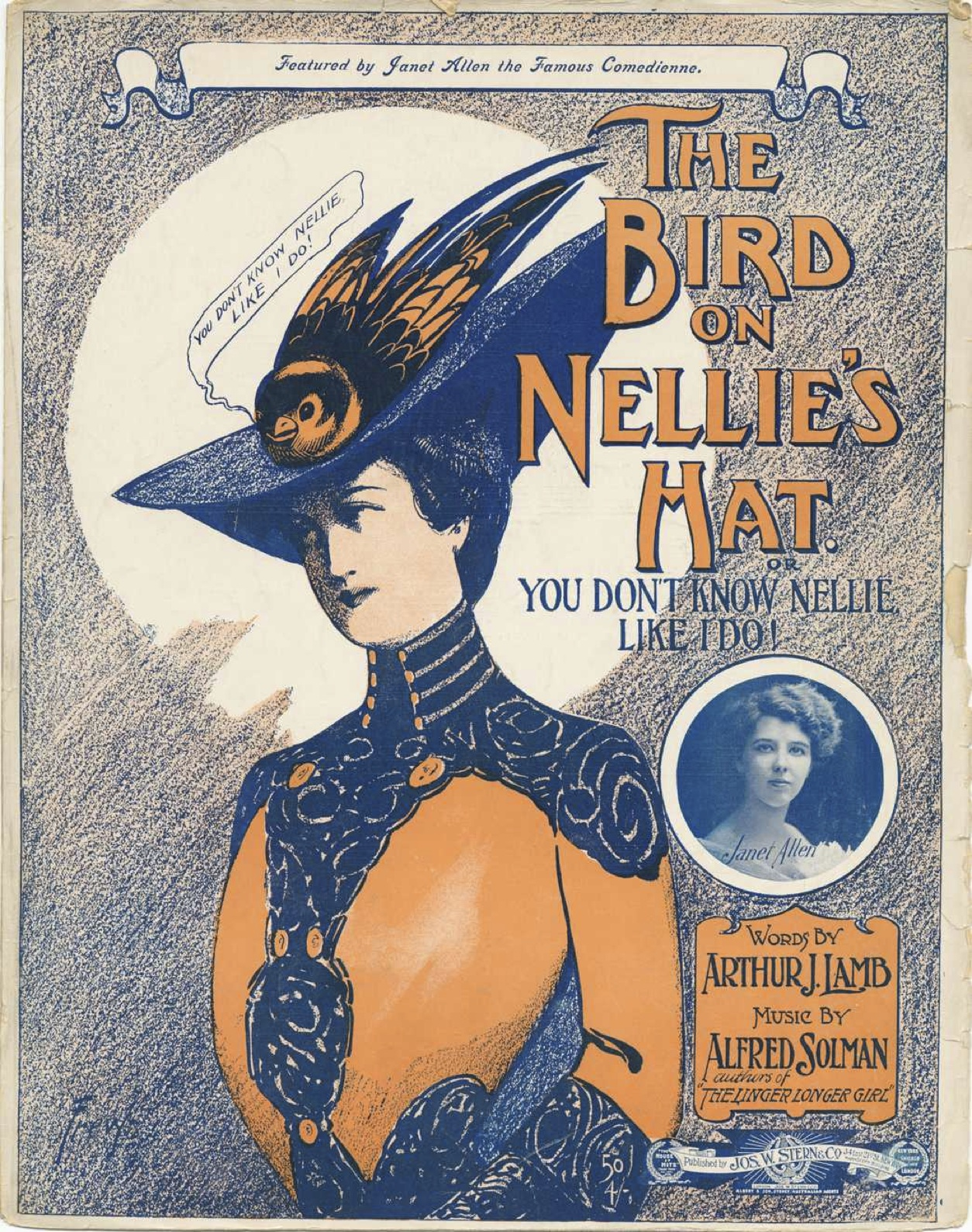
The Bird on Nellie's Hat sheet music cover, c. 1910

The most popular plumes came from various species of wading birds, known as "little snowies" for their snowy-white feathers; even more prized were the "nuptial plumes", grown during mating season and displayed by birds during courtship. Poachers often stole into the densely populated rookeries, where they would shoot and then pluck the roosting birds clean, leaving their carcasses to rot. Unprotected eggs became easy prey for predators, as were newly hatched birds, who also starved or died from exposure. One ex-poacher would later write of the practice, "The heads and necks of the young birds were hanging out of the nests by the hundreds. I am done with bird hunting forever!"

In the mid-1890s, Edwin became head of the Florida Coast Line Canal and Transportation Company and then the Model Land Company, both of which sold land for the railroads. In 1900, after twenty years living in Lake Worth, the family moved to Flamingo in Monroe County, near the Everglades. Edwin had heard that railroad tycoon Henry Flagler planned to build his railroad through the area, and that the then primitive city of Flamingo would flourish as a result; Flagler later changed his mind, deciding to build to Key West instead. Guy and his brother, who continued working as guides and hunters, each received a quarter of a mile of land on Florida Bay as part of their father's deal with the Model Land Company. While working variously as a postman, farmer and boatman during his 20s, Guy continued to augment his income with an occasional plume hunt. In 1899, he married the young widow Sophronia ("Fronie") Vickers Kirvin from Key West. Their first child, Morrell, was born a year later.

== Game warden ==
When the Florida legislature passed the American Ornithologists' Union (AOU) model law to outlaw the killing of plume birds, this created a need for qualified and competent wardens to enforce it. Kirk Munroe, a friend of the Bradley family and a founding vice president of the Florida Audubon Society, recommended Guy for the position. Seen as different from the other "wild" young men in Flamingo, Bradley was described as "pleasant, quiet… fair, with blue eyes, always whistling and a pretty good violinist… [a] social asset to the isolated, frontier community, clean-cut, reliable, courageous, energetic and conscientious".

Bradley was at this time a reformed plume hunter, who had given up the profession after the passage of the Lacey Act of 1900. In a letter to William Dutcher, president of the Florida Audubon Society, Bradley wrote "I used to hunt plume birds, but since the game laws were passed, I have not killed a plume bird. For it is a cruel and hard calling not withstanding being unlawful. I make this statement upon honor." Soon after being accepted for the position, Bradley traveled to Key West to secure his appointment as both game warden and deputy sheriff, which gave him the authority to arrest those hunting illegally.

As one of the first game wardens, Bradley was responsible for reporting suspected poachers and the businesses with which they worked. He was paid a monthly stipend of $35 ($917 in 2010) to single-handedly patrol the enormous area stretching from the Ten Thousand Islands on Florida's west coast, through the Everglades, to Key West, which served as nesting areas for popular plume birds such as egrets, herons, spoonbills and ibis. Bradley took his job seriously; he educated locals about the newly implemented laws which made plume hunting a punishable offense, spoke to hunters directly, and posted warning signs throughout his territory. He also set up a network of spies who watched for suspicious behavior, and employed his brother Louis and others close to him to work as assistant wardens during the height of the plume season.

== Difficulties ==
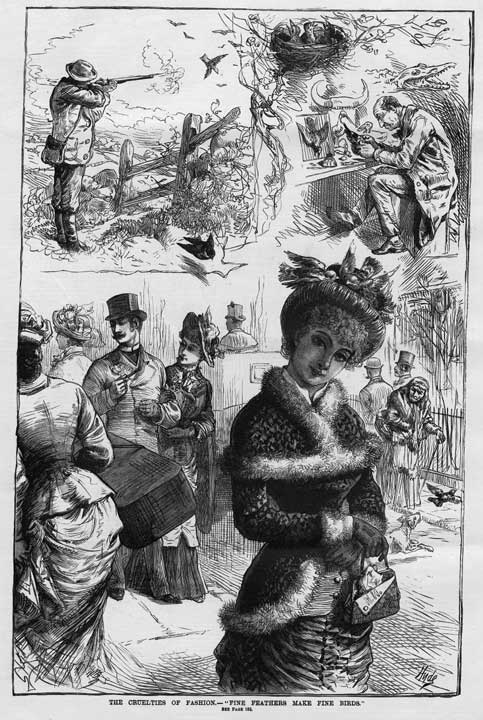
"The cruelties of fashion: fine feathers make fine birds"; the collection of feathers for hats led to the near extinction of wading birds in the Everglades.

In 1903, President Theodore Roosevelt created the first wildlife refuge in the United States, Pelican Island. Its first warden, Paul Kroegel, joined forces with Bradley to enforce the illegality of bird-hunting in Florida. By 1904, the various Audubon organizations had 34 wardens employed in ten states. Conservationist publications were optimistic that Bradley and other wardens would be successful in their enforcement; in AOU's January 1904 issue of The Auk, an editor wrote: "The natives are beginning to realize that the birds are to be protected and that the wardens are fearless men who are not to be trifled with. The Bradleys have the reputation of being the best rifle shots in that vicinity and they would not hesitate to shoot when necessary."

After accepting the position as game warden, however, Bradley became a vilified figure in southern Florida; working alone, with no reinforcements, he had been shot at more than once. In 1904, Bradley alerted visiting ornithologist and author Frank Chapman that one of the more isolated rookeries, called Cuthbert, had been "shot out" despite previously having been found to be in good condition. He reportedly said, "You could've walked right around the Rookery on those bird's bodies—between four and five hundred of them."

Bradley took the slaughter to mean that he was being watched by local hunters, who only could have discovered the rookery by tracking his movements. Chapman later wrote, "Under his guardianship the 'white birds' had increased in numbers, which, with aigrettes selling at $32 an ounce, made the venture worth the risk (for there was a risk; as the man who attempted to 'shoot out' a rookery while Bradley was on guard would probably have lost his own 'plume'); the warden watched and in his absence his charges were slaughtered."

== Death ==
On July 8, 1905, Bradley heard gunshots close to his waterfront home in Flamingo. He set sail in his small skiff, and encountered a father and his two sons by the name of Smith, who were shooting up a rookery. The families had known each other for years, but Civil War veteran Walter Smith had a reputation for being troublesome, and Bradley had previously had altercations with him. He had arrested Smith on one occasion and Smith's oldest son, Tom, twice for poaching. Smith threatened to retaliate against Bradley if he tried again, reportedly telling the warden, "You ever arrest one of my boys again, I'll kill you."

According to Walter Smith's account, Bradley encountered the three men as they were loading dead plume birds onto their boat. An argument ensued, and as the warden attempted to arrest one of the young men, Smith opened fire with his hunting rifle, fatally wounding Bradley. His body was found the next day by his brother's search party, after drifting 10 miles (16 km) from the scene of the crime. He had bled to death.

== Aftermath ==
Smith set sail to Key West and turned himself in to the authorities the next day. Despite evidence found by the prosecution—paid for by the Florida Audubon Society—that Bradley had not fired his weapon, Smith claimed self-defense. He maintained that the warden had fired first, but missed, hitting Smith's boat. Those who knew Bradley, however, insisted that he had been an excellent shot, and would not have missed his target had he, in fact, shot first. Smith later was found not guilty of murder, when the jury decided there was insufficient evidence to convict; he served only five months in jail, unable to pay $5,000 for bail. While he was incarcerated, Bradley's two brothers-in-law burned down Smith's Flamingo home.

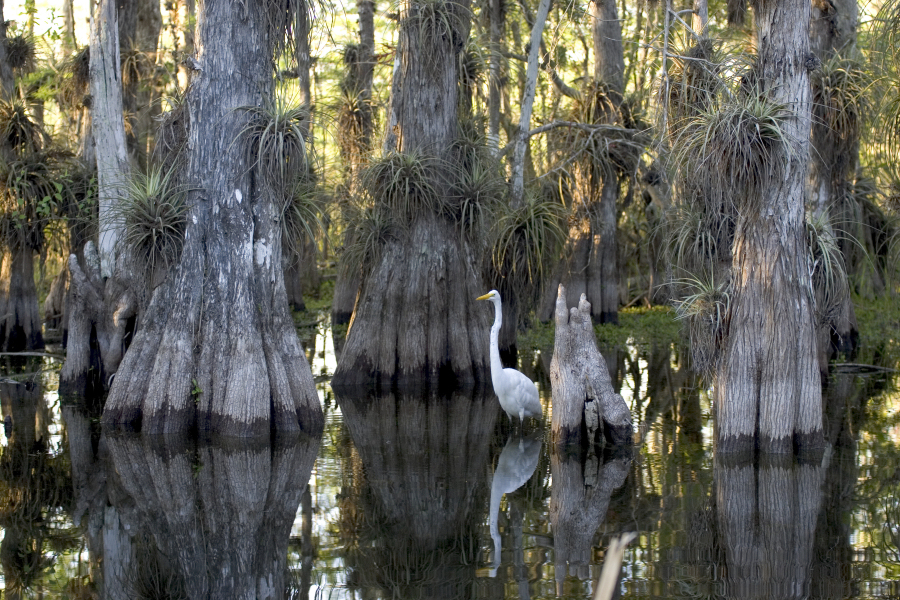
A great egret wades through a cypress grove.

Bradley's death and Smith's acquittal made national headlines; detailed stories ran in The New York Times, the New York Herald, the Philadelphia North American, and Forest and Stream. The warden's wife and two young children were given a home in Key West, paid for by donations secured by the Florida Audubon Society. The Society, however, made no effort to replace Bradley, and his job as warden went unfilled. Bradley's obituary, written by William Dutcher and published in August 1905's edition of Bird Lore, characterized him as "fearless and brave." Dutcher eulogized Bradley by saying, "A faithful and devoted warden, who was a young and sturdy man, cut off in a moment, for what? That a few more plume birds might be secured to adorn heartless women's bonnets. Heretofore the price has been the life of the birds, now is added human blood. Every great movement must have its martyrs, and Guy M. Bradley is the first martyr in bird protection."

With no one to replace Bradley, lawlessness continued in the Everglades and rookeries were devastated for several more years. Frank Chapman remarked that "There is no community sufficiently law-abiding to leave a bank vault unmolested if it were left unprotected. We have given up. We can't protect it, and the rookery will have to go." In November 1908, game warden and deputy sheriff of DeSoto County, Columbus G. McLeod, went missing near Charlotte Harbor. A month later, his boat was found weighted down and sunk; inside, police found the warden's bloodstained hat, long gashes cut into the crown with what appeared to be an axe. It was suspected that he was killed by poachers. His body was never found and the perpetrators were not caught, despite the offer of a $100.00 reward by Florida's Governor Albert W. Gilchrist. Later that year, an employee of the South Carolina Audubon Society, Pressly Reeves, was shot and killed during an ambush by unknown assailants.

== Legacy ==
These three deaths within as many years helped end the commercial trade of feathers from Florida. In 1910, the New York legislature passed the Audubon Plumage Act, outlawing the plume trade; other states followed, and Congress soon banned the import of hats decorated with bird feathers. In time, the fashion craze for bird feathers faded. As the demand for plumage dwindled, thousands of birds returned to the Everglades rookeries; adventure writer Zane Grey wrote after visiting a creek near Cape Sable:

Though we saw birds everywhere, in the air and on the foliage, we were not in the least prepared for what a bend in the stream disclosed. Banks of foliage as white with curlew as if with heavy snow! With tremendous flapping of wings that merged into a roar, thousands of curlew took wing, out over the water. …It was a most wonderful experience.

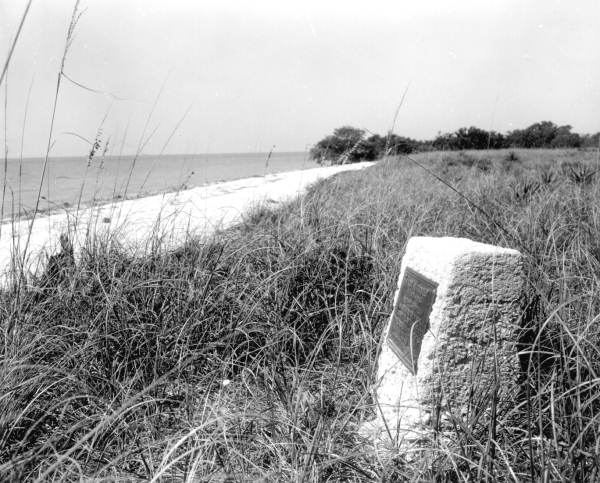
A monument commemorating Bradley was dedicated by the Florida Audubon Society (shown here in 1957), but was washed away by a hurricane in 1960.

Bradley was buried on a shell ridge at Cape Sable, overlooking Florida Bay. A nearby monument was erected by the Florida Audubon Society, reading: "Guy M. Bradley, 1870–1905, Faithful Unto Death, As Game Warden of Monroe County He Gave his Life for the Cause to Which He Was Pledged". The grave and monument, however, were later washed away in 1960's Hurricane Donna. The original gravestone was recovered, and is now on display at the Flamingo Visitor Center. A nearby plaque was also dedicated to Bradley's memory, and reads: "Audubon warden was shot and killed off this shore by outlaw feather hunters, July 8, 1905. His martyrdom created nationwide indignation, strengthened bird protection laws and helped bring Everglades National Park into being."

The story of Bradley's defense of the Everglades' birds, and the manner of his death, has been depicted in both literature and film. Author Marjory Stoneman Douglas, who would later become famous for publicizing the need for conserving and restoring the Everglades, based the hero of her 1930 short story "Plumes" on Bradley. The 1958 film Wind Across the Everglades, starring Christopher Plummer and Burl Ives, was loosely based upon Bradley's life and death. Author Harvey Eugene Oyer III featured Guy Bradley and Charlie W. Pierce in "The Adventures of Charlie Pierce: The Last Egret". Middle Rover Press, 2010.

In 1988, the National Fish and Wildlife Foundation established the Guy Bradley Award to recognize achievements in wildlife law enforcement. The award is presented annually to two recipients, one state and one federal officer. Another honor, the Guy Bradley Lifetime Conservation Award, was established in 1997 by the Audubon Society Everglades Ecosystem Restoration Campaign to those who promote conservation and offer workable conservation solutions. A trail in the Everglades, leading from the Flamingo Visitor Center to the Flamingo Campground, was also named in Bradley's honor. After a renovation, the Flamingo Visitor Center was renamed to Guy Bradley Visitor Center.

== Sources ==
- Davis, Jack E. An Everglades Providence: Marjory Stoneman Douglas and the American Environmental Century. Athens, GA: University of Georgia Press, 2009. ISBN 978-0-8203-3071-6.
- Grunwald, Michael. The Swamp: The Everglades, Florida, and the Politics of Paradise. New York, NY: Simon & Schuster, 2006. ISBN 0-7432-5105-9.
- Hammer, Roger. Everglades National Park and the Surrounding Area: A Guide to Exploring the Great Outdoors. Guilford, CT: Globe Pequot Press, 2005. ISBN 978-0-7627-3432-0.
- Huffstodt, Jim. Everglades Lawmen: True Stories of Danger and Adventure in the Glades. Sarasota, FL: Pineapple Press, 2000. ISBN 1-56164-192-8.
- McIver, Stuart B. Death in the Everglades: The Murder of Guy Bradley, America's First Martyr to Environmentalism. Gainesville, FL: University Press of Florida, 2003. ISBN 0-8130-2671-7.
- Shearer, Victoria. It Happened in the Florida Keys. Guilford, CT: Globe Pequot Press, 2008. ISBN 978-0-7627-4091-8.
- Tebeau, Charlton W. They Lived in the Park: The Story of Man in the Everglades National Park. Coral Gables, FL: University of Miami Press, 1963.
- Wilbanks, William. Forgotten Heroes: Police Officers Killed in Early Florida, 1840–1925. Paducah, KY: Turner Publishing Company, 1998. ISBN 1-56311-407-0.
