= Hugh Willoughby (scientist) =

American atmospheric and hydrospheric scientist

Academic background
- Education: BSc, Geophysics–Geochemistry, 1967, University of Arizona; MSc, Meteorology, 1969, Naval Postgraduate School; PhD, 1977, University of Miami
- Thesis: The dynamics of inertia-buoyancy waves in hurricanes (1977)

Hugh Edward Willoughby is an American atmospheric and hydrospheric scientist. He is a Distinguished Research Professor at Florida International University and an Elected Fellow of the American Association for the Advancement of Science.

== Education ==
Willoughby graduated from Ray District High School in 1963 and enrolled at the University of Arizona with a scholarship. Upon graduating with a Bachelor of Science degree in 1969, Willoughby then enrolled at the Naval Postgraduate School for his Master of Science degree in meteorology. After receiving his master's degree, Willoughby served as a flight meteorologist and taught at the United States Naval Academy. Willoughby left active duty as a Lieutenant and completed his PhD at the University of Miami. While earning his PhD, he also worked as a research meteorologist at the Hurricane Research Division of National Oceanic and Atmospheric Administration's (NOAA) Atlantic Oceanographic and Meteorological Laboratory.

== Career ==
Willoughby served as Director of the NOAA's Hurricane Research Division from 1995 to 2003, when he left to join Florida International University's International Hurricane Research Center. Willoughby was elected a Fellow of the American Association for the Advancement of Science in 2006.
