= Lillie Pierce Voss =

American pioneer (1876–1967)

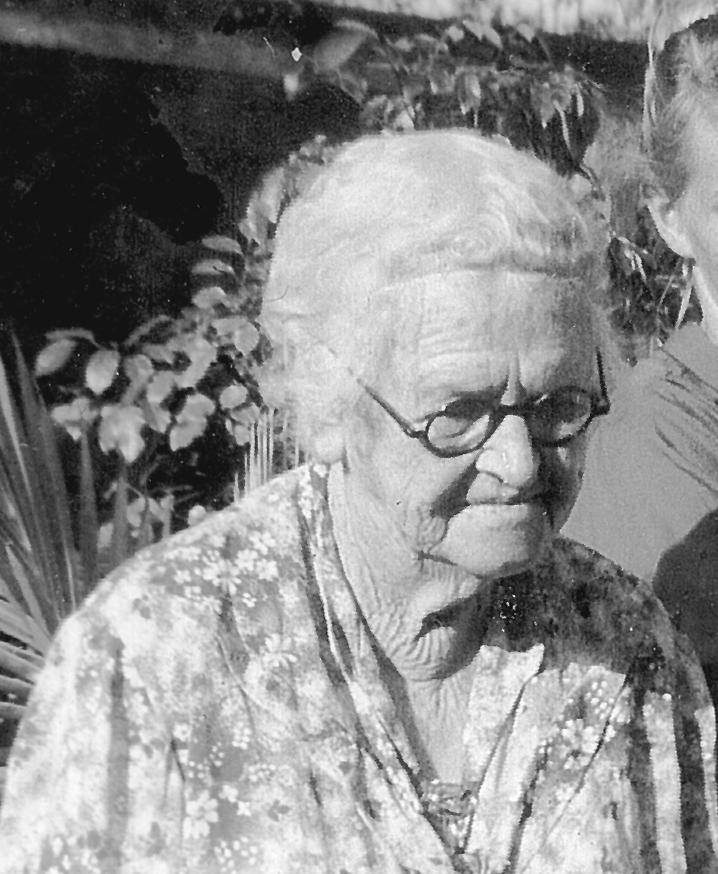
- Born: Lillie Elder Pierce; August 15, 1876; Delray Beach, U.S.
- Died: September 14, 1967 (aged 91); Boynton, Florida, U.S.
- Resting place: Hillcrest Cemetery, West Palm Beach
- Occupations: Writer, Historian
- Spouse: Frederick Christian Voss
- Writing career
- Language: English
- Period: 1900–1967
- Genre: History

Lillie Pierce Voss (15 August 1876 – 14 September 1967) was an early South Florida pioneer, inducted into the Florida Women's Hall of Fame by the Florida Commission on the Status of Women in 2012/13.

== Early life and family ==
Lillie Pierce Voss was born Lillie Elder Pierce on August 15, 1876, at United States House of Refuge No. 3 in Dade County, modern-day Delray Beach in Palm Beach County.Voss was the first white child to have ever been born between Jupiter, Florida, and Miami, Florida, a geographic area that today has nearly 6 million inhabitants. A National Register of Historic Places marker, erected in the 1970s, sits upon the location of her birth, along State Road A1A at the Delray Beach public beach. She was the daughter of Captain Hannibal Dillingham Pierce and Margretta Moore Pierce, who in 1872 became one of the first non-Native American families to settle in Southeast Florida. Together with her older brother, Charlie W. Pierce, she led an adventurous childhood in the remote, wild jungle frontier of Florida. As a child, she learned to interact with the Seminole Indians and became an expert at hunting, fishing, and sailing. The fictionalized childhood exploits of her and her brother Charlie are chronicled in the best-selling children's book series, The Adventures of Charlie Pierce, written by her great-grandson, author Harvey Oyer. She was largely educated at home and was a prolific writer who left behind many letters and diaries that are frequently used by historians to obtain glimpses of early pioneer life in South Florida.

In 1894, at age 17, she married Captain Frederick Christian Voss, a boat captain and steam engineer, who worked in South Florida during the late 19th century and early 20th century. Together, they had six children, one of whom died in childhood. One of their sons, Dr. Gilbert L. Voss, became a noted marine scientist and another son, Walter R. Voss, became a noted sport fisherman.

== Career ==
Voss and her husband played significant roles in the early development of South Florida, including bringing Major Nathan Boynton, for whom the City of Boynton Beach is named, and William S. Linton, the founder of Delray Beach, to the area. The couple built a house along the west shore of Lake Worth in the Town of Hypoluxo, where they farmed fruits and vegetables, ran a steamboat service up and down Lake Worth, and piloted yachts between Palm Beach and New England for wealthy seasonal Palm Beach residents. Voss was active in many civic organizations including the Lake Worth Pioneer Association, where she was a charter member and first president. She was also a much sought after speaker on pioneer life in South Florida. She raised her five children and resided in Hypoluxo until the death of her husband Frederick in 1957. She subsequently moved to Boynton Beach to live with her daughter, Mrs. Harvey Oyer, until her death in 1967 at age 91. She was inducted into the Florida Women's Hall of Fame in 2012–2013.

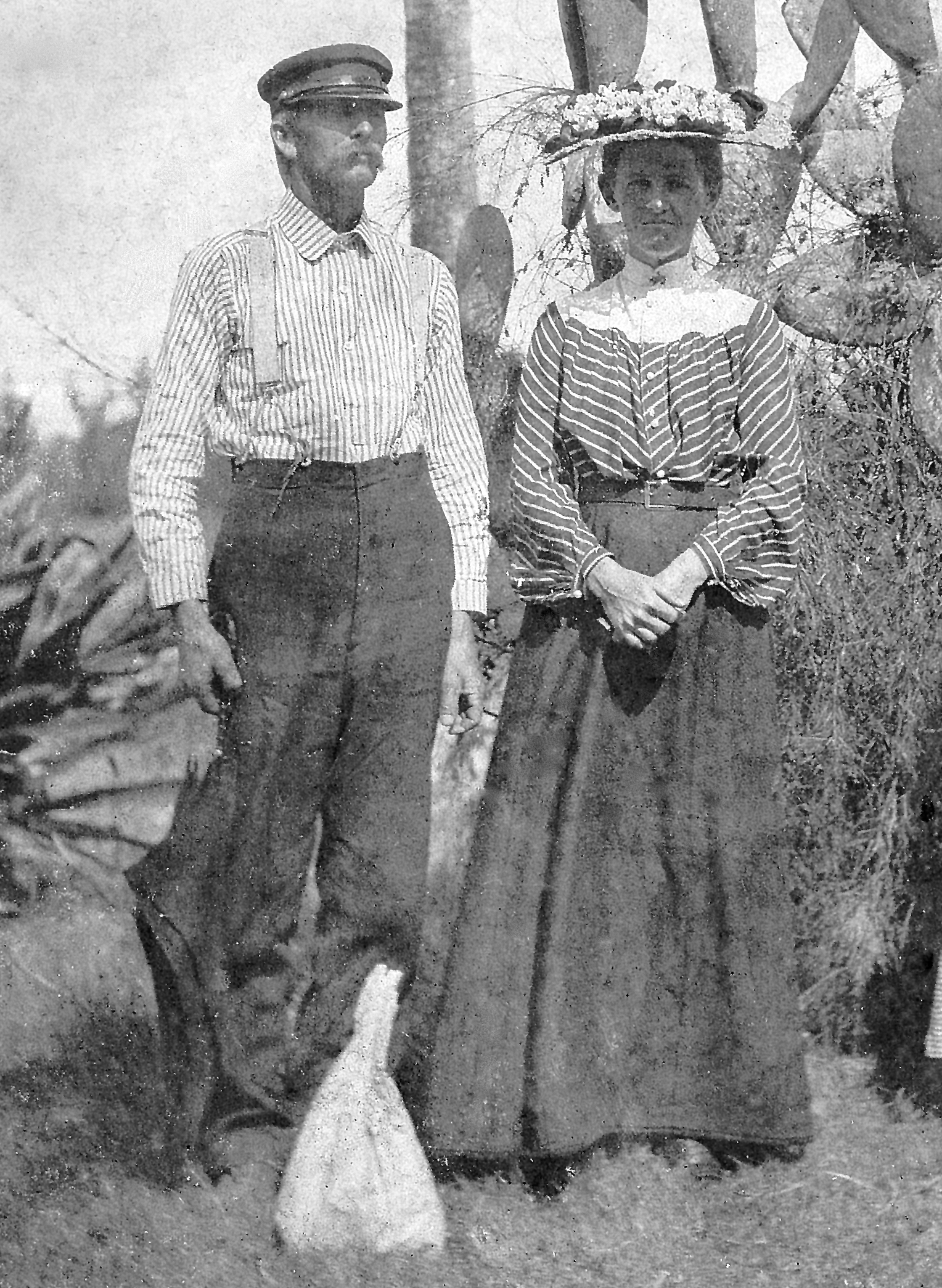
Fred Voss and Lillie Pierce Voss
