= Cox Science Center and Aquarium =

Science museum in West Palm Beach, Florida, US

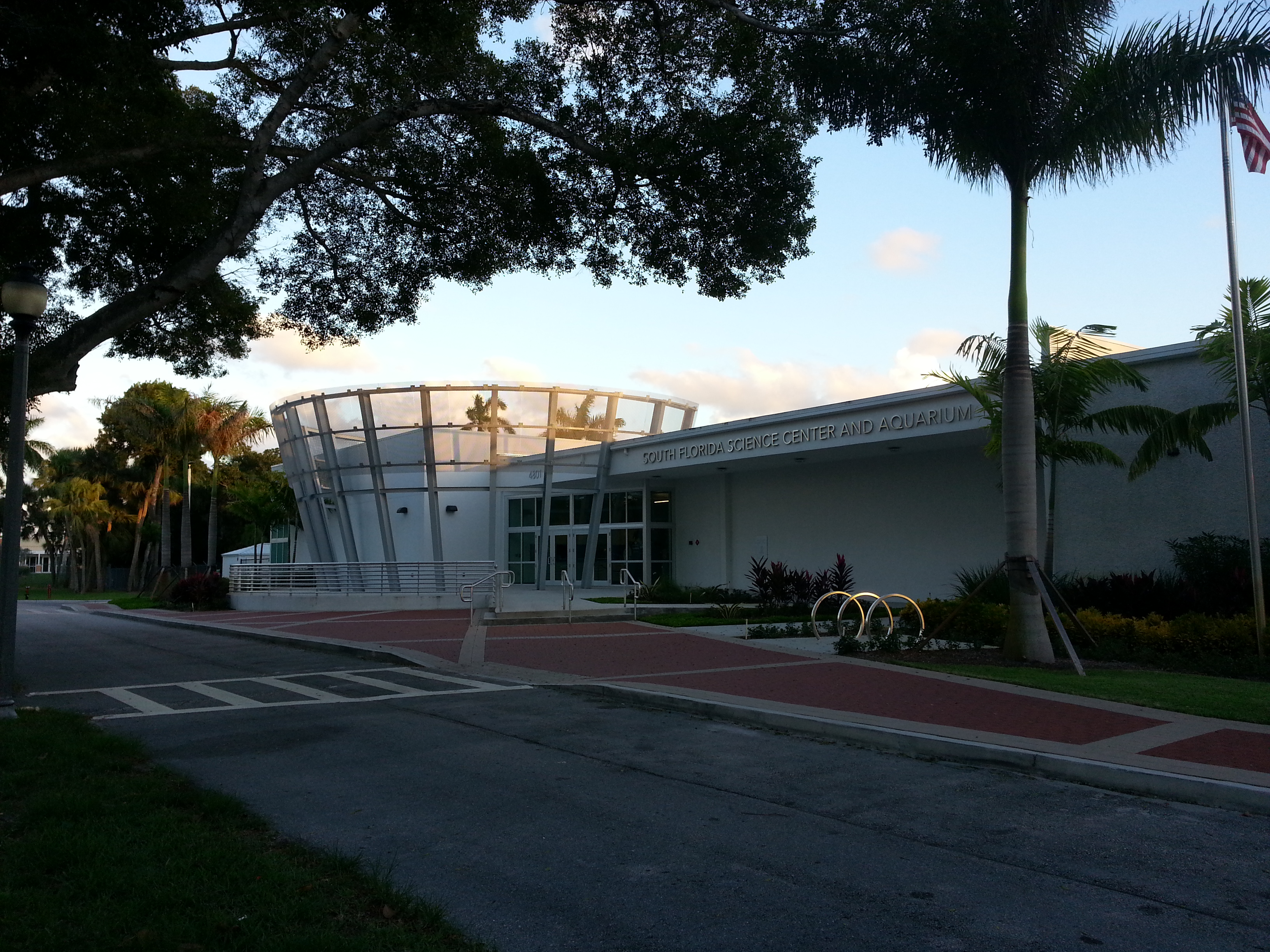

- Florida, USA
- Established: 1961
- Location: 4801 Dreher Trail North; West Palm Beach, Florida
- Coordinates: 26.66978°N 80.06878°W
- Type: Science
- President: Kate Arrizza
- Website: www.coxsciencecenter.org

The Cox Science Center and Aquarium, formerly the South Florida Science Center and Aquarium, is a science museum located in West Palm Beach, Florida. Founded in 1959, the goal of the organization is to open every mind to science through the strategic programming of interactive exhibits and engaging community-based camps and events. Attendance is 310,000 annually. The Cox Center has expanded since its creation and now houses over 50 hands-on exhibits, a planetarium, a 3,000-square-foot aquarium, a miniature golf course, and a rotating exhibit hall that hosts traveling science exhibitions. The Cox Center is a member of the Association of Science-Technology Centers (ASTC), allowing reciprocal admission benefits at affiliated institutions worldwide. The Cox Center occupies Dreher Park alongside the Palm Beach Zoo and offers deals for entrance into both facilities.

== History ==
The Junior Museum of Palm Beach County was founded in 1959 by the Junior League of the Palm Beaches to focus on the natural sciences. The museum opened on October 21, 1961 with exhibits of marine and animal life, geology, and agriculture. In 1964, a planetarium dedicated by astronaut Buzz Aldrin was completed. The Museum was expanded in 1971, doubling in size to accommodate classrooms, an auditorium, and an expanded exhibit floor. Renovations were done on the theatre and auditorium in the 1980s, and the museum became known as the South Florida Science Museum in order to reflect the more broad purpose of the museum as it had developed.

In 2008, the planetarium and theatre were renovated to accommodate more visitors. The South Florida Science Museum began expanding again in 2012, adding a 3000 square foot aquarium and a 3000 square foot permanent exhibit section containing the "River of Grass" Everglades exhibit and the NOAA Science on a Sphere exhibit. The grand re-opening of the renamed South Florida Science Center and Aquarium occurred on June 6, 2013. In 2015, the West wing of the Cox Center, the Hall of Discovery, was expanded and renovated to incorporate a nanotechnology exhibit and an early childhood education room. In 2016, an 18-hole miniature golf course designed by golf course architect Jim Fazio and professional golfer Gary Nicklaus was completed and opened to the public.

On November 15, 2021, leadership for the South Florida Science Center and Aquarium announced further expansion plans and a name change as part of a $45 million expansion campaign. A $20 million lead gift by Palm Beach residents Howard Ellis Cox Jr. and Wendy Cox launched the capital campaign to take the renamed Cox Science Center and Aquarium into the future with plans for an additional 130,000 total square feet of space for programming including science, technology, engineering and math (STEM) awareness and education. The Coxs’ gift is the largest single gift in the Center’s 60-year history and serves as the keystone for the $45 million expansion campaign.

== Aquarium ==
The "Aquariums of the Atlantic" exhibit is a 3000 square foot area consisting of multiple tanks that house native Florida species, including Queen Angels, Pink Wrasse, sharks, seahorses, eels, stingrays, and some invasive species such as the Lionfish. The largest tank is "Shipwreck Cove," a 3500 gallon tank which contains sharks, a spotted moray eel, white fin remoras, lobsters, and barracudas. Also available in the aquarium is a 6 ft coral reef tank that has a hollowed-out center which allows visitors to step into the center of the tank. The species in this tank are primarily from the Red Sea, Hawaiian Islands, Indo-Pacific, and Atlantic Ocean. Marine animals native to the Florida Everglades such as alligators and turtles are also on display in the aquarium. The aquarium operators host "touch tanks" which allow visitors a chance to feel some of the species of marine life in the aquarium.

== Marvin Dekelboum Planetarium ==
The planetarium presents daily shows utilizing a traditional star projector, as well as full-dome digital video presentations on a variety of scientific topics.

Initially, founded in 1959, a new wing was built in 1964 to include the planetarium dedicated by and named after Buzz Aldrin. In 2008, the planetarium and theater were renovated with funds from the Dekelboum Family Foundation and renamed after the Dekelboum Family.

In 2004, the Science Center received its largest donation from the Dekelboum Family Foundation for a new facility of $10 million - for every dollar raised for the new facility, the Foundation would match up to $10 million. In 2005, the voters approved a $4 million cultural bond to help build the new facility. The museum secured more than $20 million in funds to build the newly renamed Dekelboum Science Center and Dekelboum Planetarium.

In addition to its renowned star shows and digital presentations, the planetarium offers community outreach programs, allowing students and visitors to experience astronomy and space science through hands-on activities and interactive events. These programs are part of the center's efforts to engage the public in STEM education, building on the legacy of the Dekelboum Family's support for scientific advancement.

== Exhibits ==
=== Traveling exhibits ===
The Cox Center main exhibit floor is utilized by temporary traveling exhibits. These exhibits are typically open for six months before being changed. Past exhibits include an Egyptian themed “Mummies” exhibit, “Titanic,” and “Dinosaurs Around the World.” The most recent exhibit on display was “Astronaut,” which showed visitors the training and mission procedures for astronauts in the NASA program. The exhibit included a launch simulator and various mental and physical activities designed to imitate real astronaut training.

=== Permanent exhibits ===
The Science Center is home to the following permanent exhibits: Conservation Station, Everglades Exhibit, River of Grass, States of Matter, Hurricane Simulator, over 50 brain teasers, interactive outdoor science trail, and themed miniature golf.

== See also ==
- Phillip and Patricia Frost Museum of Science
