= Hugh L. Willoughby =

- Born: August 7, 1856; Middletown, Delaware County, New York, US
- Died: April 4, 1939 (aged 82)
- Burial place: Brooklyn, Kings County, New York, US
- Occupations: Explorer and Aviator
- Known for: Expedition across the Everglades; Aviation Pioneer for seaplanes
- Notable work: Across the Everglades: A Canoe Journey of Exploration, 1898
- Spouse: Augusta de Payser Harrison (m. 1878)
- Children: 2

Hugh L. Willoughby (August 7, 1856 - April 4, 1939) was an American adventurer known for his Everglades expedition and his work as an aviation pioneer, specializing in the development of early seaplanes.

== Early life ==
Hugh de Laussat Willoughby was born on August 7, 1856, at the family residence Solitude, in the town of Middletown, New York. His parents were Samuel Augustus Willoughby, a Brooklyn, New York banker who was born in Nova Scotia, Canada, and Susanna Estelle de Laussat Willoughby (née Cook). The family later lived in Ossining, Westchester County, New York.

Born to wealth, Willoughby lived the life of a sportsman, branching out into scientific exploration and aviation. Willoughby graduated from the University of Pennsylvania in 1877 with a Bachelor of Science degree in mining engineering. Willoughby went on to study law for three years, but did not finish. He was active in intercollegiate sports, and won the first Intercollegiate Athletic Championship Cup for the University of Pennsylvania in 1877. Willoughby was an early bicycle enthusiast, organizing the third bicycle club in America in 1879; he helped organize the League of American Wheelmen (serving as first treasurer) in 1880.

In 1894, Willoughby organized the Naval Reserve Torpedo Company of Newport, Rhode Island, as a ranking officer of the Rhode Island Naval Reserves in 1895-1896, with the acting rank of Lieutenant-commander. He was also appointed to the United States Naval War College and studied at the United States Torpedo Station.

Willoughby was very active in the New York Yacht Club, joining in 1875. He won six first prizes, and became a life member of the club in 1889.

== Career ==
=== Adventurer and explorer ===
In 1897 Willoughby undertook a canoe trip across the Florida Everglades. The purpose of his trip was to explore the area of the Everglades in which the Seminole Indians lived, having been driven to hide in the Everglades after the Seminole Wars. This area of the Everglades had not been explored in previous expeditions, such as that of James E. Ingraham. Willoughby also wanted to make a scientific study of the flora and fauna of the Everglades on behalf of the University of Pennsylvania, including taking water samples that have served as baseline data for the Everglades water system. He also wished to survey the channel through the Ten Thousand Islands in southwest Florida. Willoughby’s thorough planning, measuring, documenting, sampling, and publication of his Everglades expedition were remarkable for a gentleman explorer of his era, providing scientists the opportunity to compare and contrast his findings with the modern condition of the Everglades. Willoughby started his journey by making a test run in an Indian canoe with hunter and guide Ed Brewer in the area of the Miami River.

Willoughby had been taught the secret of traversing the Everglades by using a canoe and pole, rather than a paddle. For the expedition in 1897, Willoughby started on the west coast of Florida near the Ten Thousand Islands. Willoughby's resulting book, Across the Everglades: A canoe journey of exploration provided great detail on the adventure across the Everglades and the hardships Willoughby and Brewer suffered. The expedition proved popular across the nation, and was chronicled in newspapers of the time. Willoughby wrote: “It may seem strange, in our days of Arctic and African exploration, for the general public to learn that in our very midst . . . in one of our Atlantic coast states, we have a tract of land one hundred and thirty miles long and seventy miles wide that is as much unknown to the white man as the heart of Africa.”

In 2022, to commemorate the 125th anniversary of Willoughby's expedition, a team is planning to follow the same trek that Willoughby and Brewer took across the Everglades.

=== Aviation pioneer ===
After his Everglades expedition, Willoughby turned his interests toward aviation. Willoughby attended the 1900 World's Fair in Paris, France. It was there that Willoughby had his first experience with flight, taking a balloon ride over the city of Paris. Upon his return to the United States, Willoughby became friends with pioneer aviator Orville Wright. They corresponded about airplane designs; Wright advised him not to spend too much money experimenting, and just purchase a Wright airplane. Since money was no object, Willoughby set out to design an airplane and its various components. Willoughby was awarded a patent (U.S. Patent No. 1,008,096) for his design of double rudders for aircraft. In 1909, he designed the War Hawk airplane which used a tractor engine to drive the propeller. It was the first airplane where the propeller was at the front of the plane, and was at the time the airplane with the largest wingspan. Willoughby was 53 years old when he earned his pilot's license, signed by Orville Wright.

Willoughby then started experimenting with seaplanes from his home in Sewall's Point Florida. Willoughby built the seaplane called the Pelican with pontoon floats, the tractor engine and his patented double rudders. A replica of the Pelican resides at the Elliot Museum, in Stuart, Florida. He formed the Willoughby Aeroplane Company to design and market high end seaplanes to wealthy sportsman.

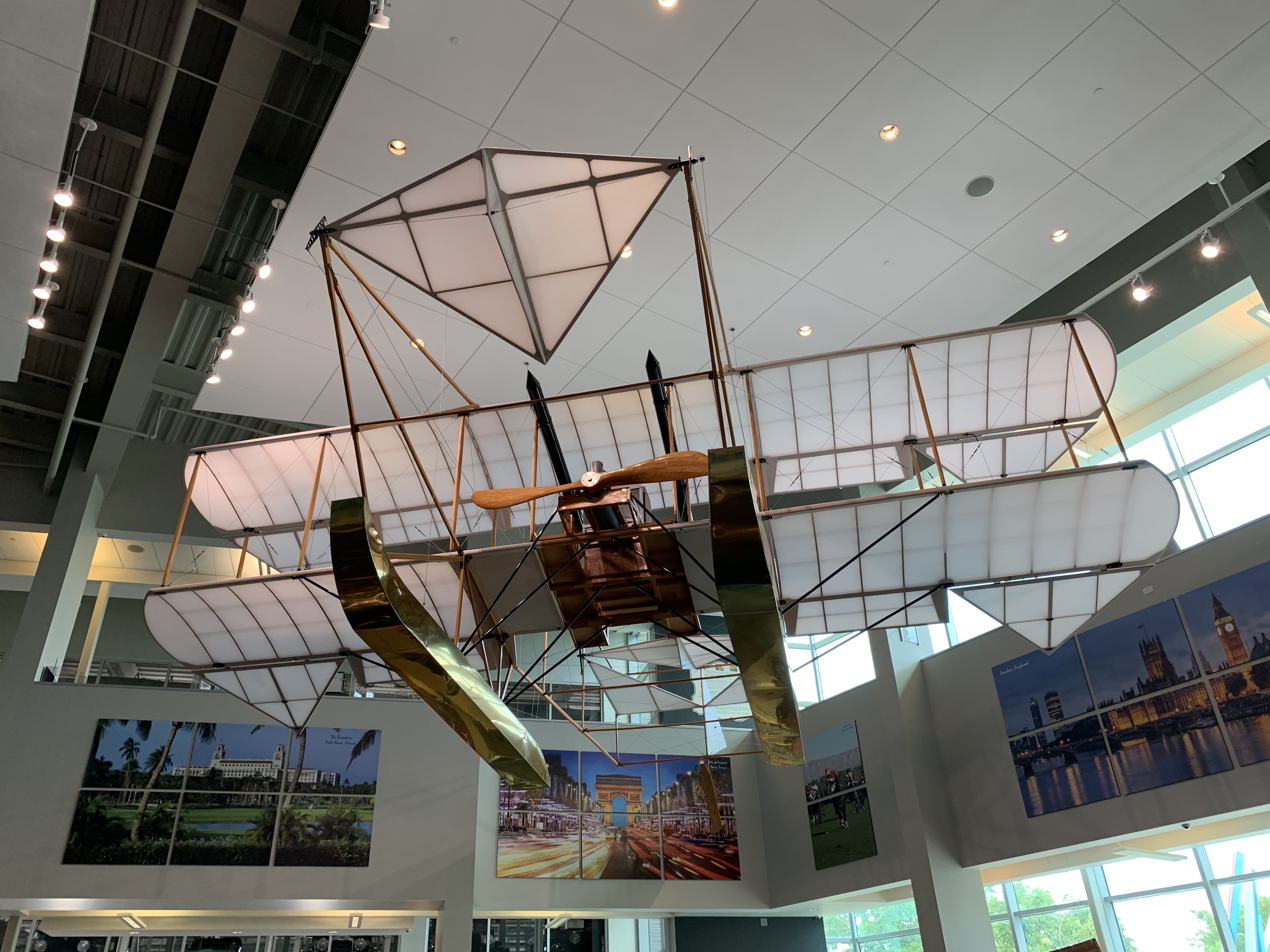
Pelican airplane reproduction at the Elliot Museum, Stuart, Florida.

== Personal life ==
On October 27, 1878, Hugh L. Willoughby married Augusta de Peyser Harrison (1854-1945). They resided in their summer home The Chalet in Newport, Rhode Island. The winter residence, Mandalay, was located in Sewall's Point, Florida. The couple had three children:

- Estelle de Laussat Willoughby Dixon Supplee Debakhtiar (1880–1975)
- Katherine Harrison Willoughby Clarke (1883–1978)
- Hugh de Laussat Willoughby, Jr. (1885–1956) He was commissioned as a lieutenant (junior grade) in the Naval Coast Defense Reserve for service during World War I.

Willoughby died at his home Mandalay on Sewall's Point, Florida on April 4, 1939, at age 82. He is buried in Green-Wood Cemetery in Brooklyn, New York.

== Publication ==
Across the Everglades: A canoe journey of exploration. Philadelphia: J.B. Lippincott Company, 1899. Available online at https://babel.hathitrust.org/cgi/pt?id=chi.57770522&view=1up&seq=241&skin=2021
