= History of the National Wildlife Refuge System =

Aspect of history

The National Wildlife Refuge System in the United States has a long and distinguished history.

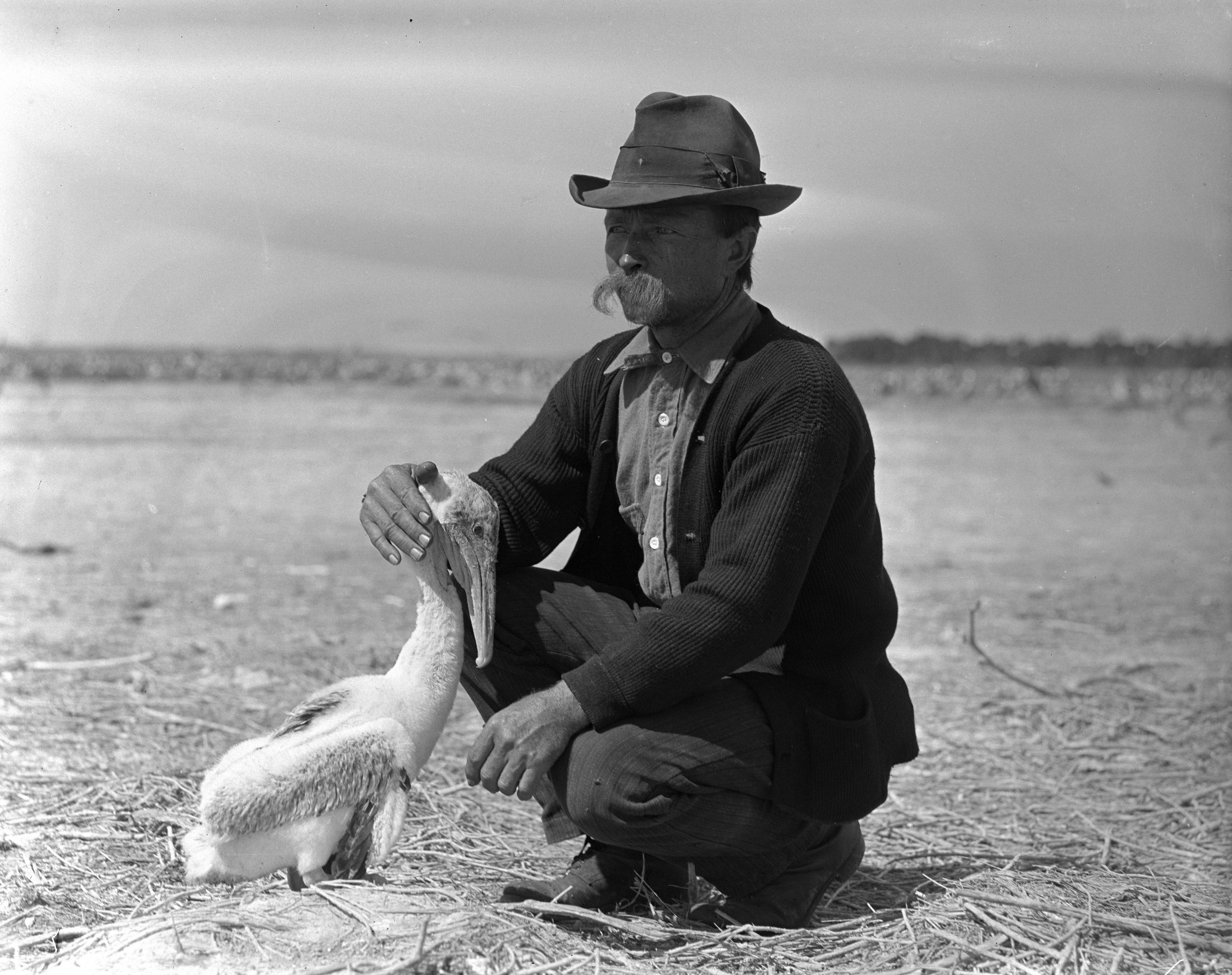
Game warden Paul Kroegel with a brown pelican at Pelican Island, 1907.

== Early conservation efforts ==
In January 1902, a plan was hatched by members of the Boone and Crockett Club to create a system of wildlife refuges across the United States with support of fellow member Theodore Roosevelt. And by Executive Order of March 14, 1903, President Theodore Roosevelt established Pelican Island National Wildlife Refuge, along Florida's central Atlantic coast, as the first unit of the present National Wildlife Refuge System. It is misleading, however, to conclude that this was the genesis of wildlife sanctuaries in the United States.

There is no clear documentation of just when the concept of protecting wildlife through habitat preservation was born, but as long ago as the mid-19th century, diaries of early western explorers, pictorial records and reports from journalists and speakers familiar with the West brought a public realization that the unrestricted slaughter of wildlife for food, fashion and commerce was systematically destroying an irreplaceable national heritage.

The first federal action aimed in part at protecting wildlife resources on a designated area appears to be an act of Congress on June 30, 1864, that transferred the Yosemite Valley from the public domain to the State of California. One of the terms of the transfer was that State authorities "shall provide against the wanton destruction of the fish and game found within the said reservation and against their capture and destruction for purposes of merchandise or profit."

Yosemite Valley was later returned to the federal government. In 1872, Yellowstone National Park was established, primarily to protect the area's hot springs and geysers, but again, the "wanton destruction" of wildlife was forbidden. Establishment as a national park did not, however, produce the desired wildlife protection effect until passage of the Yellowstone Park Protection Act of 1894.

The earliest effort to set aside an area of federally owned land specifically for wildlife occurred in 1868 when President Ulysses S. Grant took action to protect the Pribilof Islands in Alaska as a reserve for the northern fur seal. In 1869, the Congress formally enacted legislation for this purpose. These remote islands in the Bering Sea were the site of the world's largest rookery of this commercially valuable animal, and the federal government was prompted in its action primarily due to interest in obtaining revenue from the management of the fur resource. Fundamentally, this action marked a formal recognition of the need to protect and manage wildlife resources for their renewable values.

Under provisions of the Forest Reserve Act of March 3, 1891, President Benjamin Harrison created by an executive order the Afognak Island Forest and Fish Culture Reserve in Alaska, "including its adjacent bays and rocks and territorial waters, including among others the sea lion and sea otter islands." The action showed, in its executive history, that wildlife concerns were a paramount element in the proposal. However, possibly because of the emphasis on forest and fish resource protection, the value of this area as a wildlife refuge often escapes deserved recognition. This order also established the first reservation for fish.

As a result of an increasing awareness of the importance of fish and wildlife resources, in 1871 the Federal Office of Commissioner of Fisheries and in 1886 the Division of Economic Ornithology and Mammalogy (U.S. Department of Agriculture) were established to gain better information about the Nation's fish and wildlife resources. From studies performed by these agencies it became evident that the resources were in jeopardy and conservation, sportsmen's and scientific organizations began to lobby the Congress.

One such organization was the Boone and Crockett Club, founded in 1887 by a group of leading explorers, hunters, writers, scientists and political leaders, including Theodore Roosevelt. Roosevelt was acquainted with resource management needs and with many individuals, organizations and agencies concerned about threats to wildlife and the need for natural resource protection.

By the turn of the 20th century the nation had witnessed the near extinction of the bison, increasing devastation of wading bird populations by plume hunting in Florida, and severe reductions in the populations of other once abundant forms of wildlife such as the passenger pigeon. Public support increased for more vigorous actions on the part of the government to reverse this downward slide.

In Florida, in an effort to control plume hunting, the American Ornithologists Union and the National Association of Audubon Societies (now the National Audubon Society) persuaded the State Legislature to pass a model non-game bird protection law in 1901. These organizations then employed wardens to protect rookeries, in effect establishing colonial bird sanctuaries.

== Initial development ==
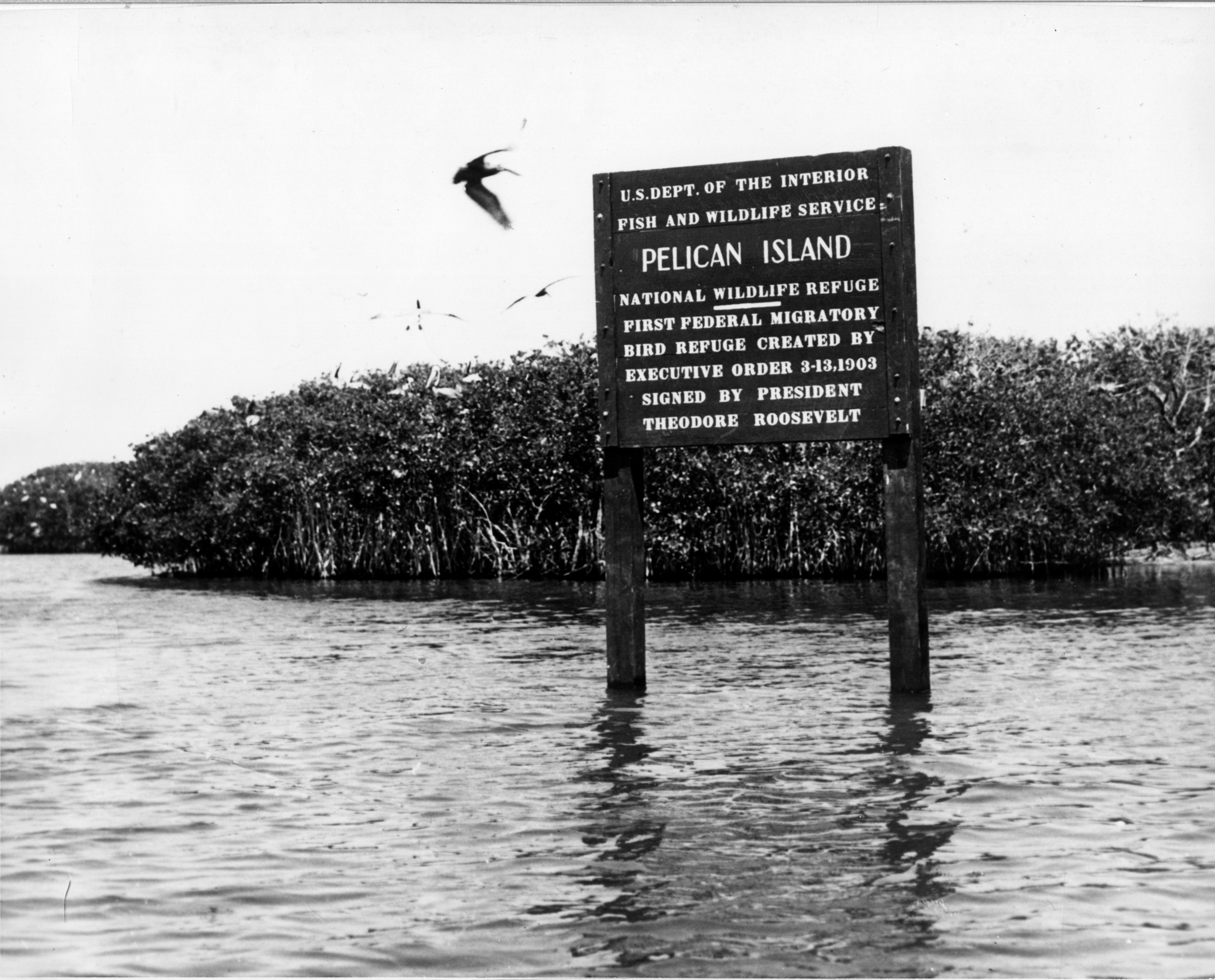
Pelican Island NWR

Such public concern, combined with the conservation-minded President Roosevelt, resulted in the initial federal land specifically set aside for a non-marketable form of wildlife (the brown pelican) when 3-acre (12,000 m^{2}) Pelican Island was proclaimed a Federal Bird Reservation in 1903. Thus, it is said to be the first bona fide "refuge." The first warden employed by the government at Pelican Island, Paul Kroegel, was an Audubon warden whose salary was $1 a month.

Following the modest trend begun with Pelican Island, many other islands and parcels of land and water were quickly dedicated for the protection of various species of colonial nesting birds that were being destroyed for their feathers. Such refuge areas included Breton, Louisiana (1904), Passage Key, Florida (1905), Shell Keys, Louisiana (1907), and Key West, Florida (1908).

The need for sound management of these reservations or refuges had become apparent as the knowledge of preservation and conservation requirements grew. In 1905, the Bureau of Biological Survey was established in the Department of Agriculture, replacing the old Division of Economic Ornithology and Mammalogy, with responsibility for new reservations and "set-aside" areas.

During this period of time, on the Pacific coast sea bird populations were declining due to their extensive exploitation for eggs, feathers and guano. In response to this growing bird resource threat, federal reserve status was granted to Quillayute Needles, Washington in 1907 and to Farallon Islands, California and areas of the Hawaiian Islands in 1909. Establishment of Lower Klamath, California in 1908 then marked the beginning of the practice of creating wildlife refuges on Bureau of Reclamation reservoirs. Seventeen such western "overlay" refuges were established on one day alone in 1909 by Executive Order 1032 of February 25. By the end of his administration in 1909, Roosevelt had issued a total of 51 executive orders that established wildlife reservations in 17 states and three territories.

Congress also had continued to respond to the public mood recognized by Roosevelt in establishing the Wichita Mountains Forest and Game Preserve in 1905, the National Bison Range in 1908, and the National Elk Refuge in 1912. The latter was the first unit of the present system to be referred to as a "refuge." The Izaak Walton League had initiated establishment of the National Elk Refuge by purchasing lands which they then donated to the government as a nucleus for the refuge. At the time it was said that elk were so plentiful that they were killed for their prized teeth alone, which brought as much as $1,500 a pair. Then in 1913, some 2.7 million acres (11,000 km^{2}) were set aside in one action by President William Howard Taft when the vast Aleutian Island chain was added to the system.

The federal government first exerted authority over migratory birds by legislation, the Migratory Bird Act, enacted in 1913 to protect migratory bird species. An interesting historical footnote is that this landmark legislation was attached as a rider to an agricultural appropriation bill and signed unknowingly by outgoing President Taft. Subsequently, the Migratory Bird Treaty Act of 1918 was concluded between the United States and Great Britain (for Canada) in 1916. This treaty, implemented by Congress in 1918, created an even larger role for the federal government in managing migratory birds.

== Organization and growth ==
The Migratory Bird Treaty Act of 1918 provided for regulations to control the taking of migratory species. Implementation of this act did result in increased populations for a time. However, it soon became clear that effective management of the resource would require increased efforts to protect habitat. Refuges, established primarily by executive order, were still for the most part too few and too small to ensure the future of such wide-ranging migratory species as waterfowl and shore birds.

The first refuge acquisitions specifically for management of waterfowl came about with the acts establishing the Upper Mississippi River Wild Life and Fish Refuge in 1924 (again through impetus provided by the Izaak Walton League) and the Bear River Migratory Bird Refuge in 1928. Prior to this, the initial attempts to provide for the systematic acquisition of new lands for refuges had begun in 1921. A bill was introduced in Congress that would establish a "Refuge System," a Migratory Bird Refuge Commission, and a one-dollar federal hunting stamp.

The bill was rejected four times during the next eight years. Finally, in 1929, it became law under the Migratory Bird Conservation Act, but only after it was stripped of any provisions for refuge hunting areas and a federal hunting stamp. The costs for managing and expanding the system were to be funded by Congressional appropriations. Despite these shortcomings, this act provided the authority under which the National Wildlife Refuge System grew in the years that followed.

A major stimulus for the Refuge System came in 1934 with the passage of the Migratory Bird Hunting and Conservation Stamp Act (known as the Duck Stamp Act). The act's later amendments increased the price of the stamp providing a continuing source of revenue for acquisition of migratory bird habitat. They also authorized that a part of a refuge's area could be opened to waterfowl hunting (now set at 40% by the NWRS Administration Act of 1966).

Of equal importance in 1934 was the appointment by President Franklin Roosevelt of a special "blue ribbon" committee, consisting of Jay Norwood "Ding" Darling, chairman, and Thomas Beck and Aldo Leopold to study and advise him on waterfowl needs. This dynamic trio alerted the Nation, as no other group had done before, to the crisis facing the waterfowl resource as a result of drought, over-harvest and habitat destruction. They also campaigned vigorously for the funds to combat these problems. Then, in 1935 "Ding" Darling was appointed head of the Bureau of Biological Survey and brought with him a dynamic and energetic young midwesterner, J. Clark Salyer II, to manage the fledgling refuge program.

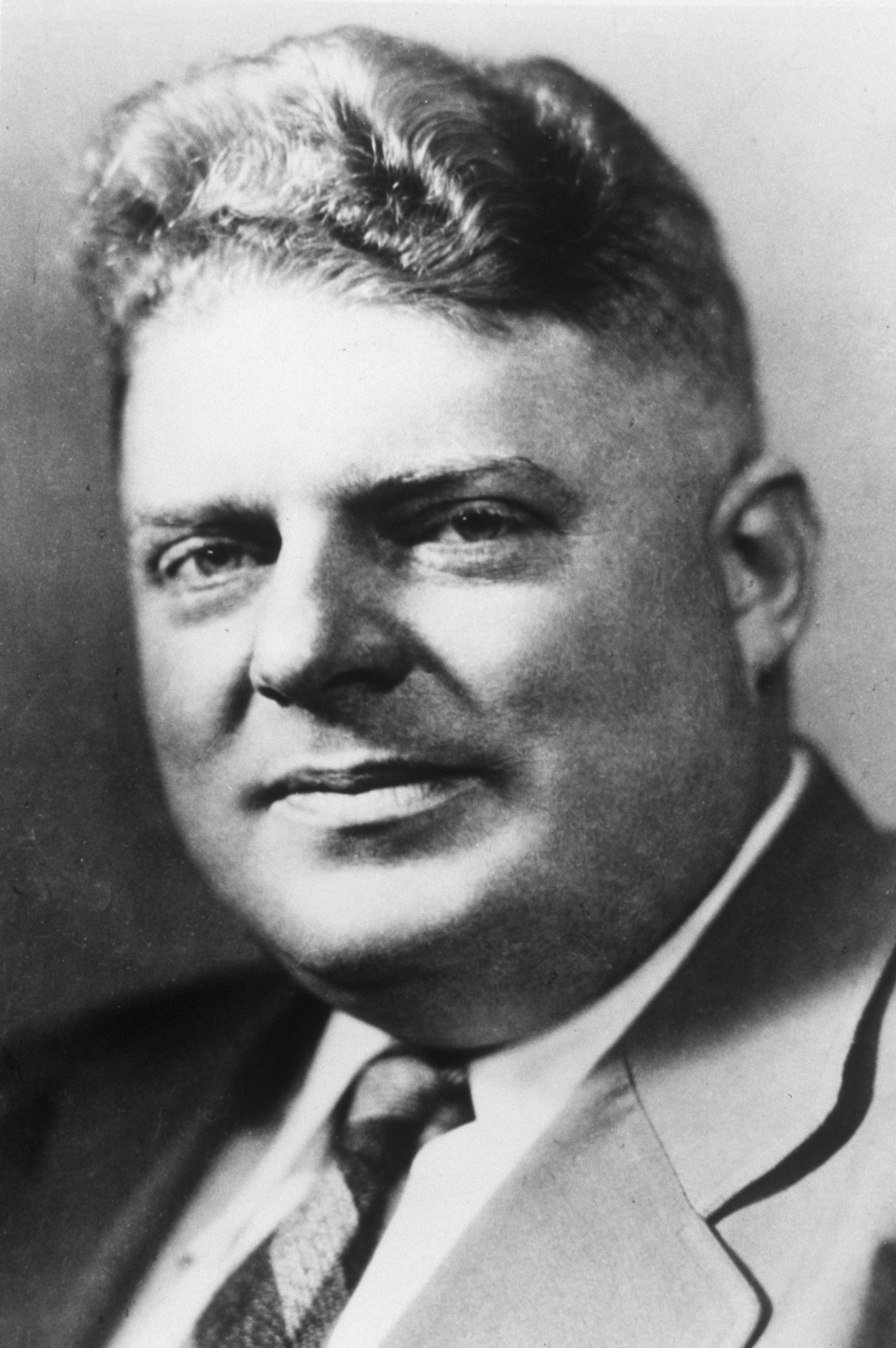
John Clark Salyer, II

For the next 31 years, until his death in 1966, Salyer was the primary driving force in selecting new refuge areas and campaigning for their acquisition, in defending their integrity, in protecting the wildlife which they harbored, and in seeing that refuges were administered and managed to best serve the wildlife resource. Theodore Roosevelt, "Ding" Darling and others had a profound influence on the development of the Refuge System, but Salyer was unquestionably the "father" of the system. The imprints of his involvement remain to this day.

The year 1934 also saw the passage of the Fish and Wildlife Coordination Act. This act, amended several times between 1934 and 1965, authorizes most federal water resource agencies to acquire lands associated with water use projects as mitigation and enhancement of fish and wildlife. The act further provides for the management of these lands by the Fish and Wildlife Service or State wildlife agencies.

Two other important developments during these years were the Migratory Bird and Mammal Treaty with Mexico in 1936 and the Lea Act of 1948. The latter legislation served to greatly increase the acquisition of waterfowl habitat in California. The Bankhead-Jones Farm Tenant Act, passed in 1937, was the authority used for establishing a number of wildlife refuges across the country. Under this act, certain lands acquired by the Resettlement Administration were designated by executive order for management as refuges. Refuges acquired under this authority include Carolina Sandhills in South Carolina, Piedmont in Georgia, Noxubee in Mississippi, and Necedah in Wisconsin.

For several decades the Bureau of Biological Survey had remained in the Department of Agriculture and the Bureau (formerly Commission) of Fisheries in the Department of Commerce. In 1939 both bureaus were transferred to the Department of the Interior through an Executive Branch reorganization.

They were merged to form the Fish and Wildlife Service in 1940. Then in 1956, two bureaus were formed under the U. S. Fish and Wildlife Service—the Bureau of Sport Fisheries and Wildlife (which included the Division of Wildlife Refuges) and the Bureau of Commercial Fisheries. Subsequently, the Bureau of Commercial Fisheries was transferred in 1970 to the Department of Commerce and became the National Marine Fisheries Service, while the Fish and Wildlife Service still remains a bureau of the Department of the Interior.

== New directions ==
The Fish and Wildlife Act of 1956 established a comprehensive national fish and wildlife policy and broadened the authority for acquisition and development of refuges. The funds necessary to implement this authority, however, were not immediately forthcoming. Without increased funding, land acquisition during the 1950s could not keep pace with the high rate of drainage (primarily due to intensive agricultural development) of waterfowl breeding habitat in the prairie pothole country.

To remedy this situation, Congress passed an amendment to the Duck Stamp Act in 1958 which authorized the Waterfowl Production Area (WPA) program. To fund the WPA program and accelerate the wetland preservation effort, Congress also passed the Wetlands Loan Act of 1961. As later amended, this act authorized a loan of $200 million to be spent over a period of 23 years and to be repaid from duck stamp revenues.

Recognizing new public demands for recreational activities after World War II, Congress passed the Refuge Recreation Act of 1962. This act authorized the recreational use of refuges when such uses did not interfere with the area's primary purposes and when sufficient funds were available to conduct recreational activities. The act also clarified the appropriateness of public use on refuges, encouraged efforts to provide wildlife-oriented recreation, interpretation and environmental education activities, and required that such uses be compatible with the purposes for which the lands were acquired.

Perhaps the law of greatest significance to wildlife refuges since the Migratory Bird Conservation Act of 1929 has been the National Wildlife Refuge System Administration Act of 1966. The act provided guidelines and directives for administration and management of all areas in the system including "wildlife refuges, areas for the protection and conservation of fish and wildlife that are threatened with extinction, wildlife ranges, game ranges, wildlife management areas, and waterfowl production areas."

In addition, the 1966 law established the standard of "compatibility," requiring that uses of refuge lands must be determined to be compatible with the purposes for which individual refuges were established. This standard was later strengthened and clarified in the National Wildlife Refuge System Improvement Act of 1997.

The Endangered Species Act of 1973 also redirected management emphasis on some refuges. It is considered the world's foremost law protecting species faced with extinction. This act has provided extensive means of protection for endangered species (including penalties for harming endangered animals, review and compliance obligations for various federal agency programs, and the listing of species eligible for protection). Over 25 new refuges was added under this authority including Attwater Prairie Chicken, Texas, Mississippi Sandhill Crane, Mississippi, Columbian White-tailed Deer, Washington, and Crocodile Lake, Florida.

The Alaska Native Claims Settlement Act of 1971 (ANCSA), an outgrowth of the Alaska Statehood Act, is a law of enormous importance to the National Wildlife Refuge System. Among numerous other provisions, it authorized the addition of immense areas of highly productive, internationally significant wildlife lands. Further far-reaching resource protection measures for Alaska were mandated by Congress in the passage on December 2, 1980, of the Alaska National Interest Lands Conservation Act (ANILCA). The act added nine new refuges, expanded seven existing refuges and added 53.7 million acres (217,000 km^{2}) to the NWRS. This act alone nearly tripled the area of lands encompassed in the Refuge System.

== Approaching the centennial ==
In 1997, Congress provided much-needed organic legislation with the passage of the National Wildlife Refuge System Improvement Act. This legislation amended the National Wildlife Refuge System Administration Act of 1966 and provided significant new guidance for the management of the Refuge System. It provided a new statutory mission statement and directed that the Refuge System be managed as a national system of lands and waters devoted to conserving wildlife and maintaining biological integrity of ecosystems. The law also clarified management priorities by declaring that certain wildlife-dependent recreational uses are appropriate activities on refuges, strengthened the compatibility determination process, and required the Service to undertake comprehensive conservation planning for each refuge. In 2006, a bi-partisan group of 100 members of Congress formed the Congressional Wildlife Refuge Caucus to further the needs of the Refuge System with a unified voice.

From the earliest years national wildlife refuges have played a major role in the evolution of resource conservation in the United States. The National Wildlife Refuge System now comprises more than 520 units in all 50 states, American Samoa, Puerto Rico, the US Virgin Islands, the Johnston Atoll, Midway Atoll and several other Pacific Islands. Refuges now encompass over 93 million acres (380,000 km^{2}) of valuable wildlife habitat.

Included in this total are nearly 1.9 million acres (7,700 km^{2}) of wetlands in the Prairie Pothole Region of the north-central United States. These wetlands are known as "waterfowl production areas", and have federal protection through fee acquisition or easements. This vital habitat, together with the wetlands of the Canadian prairies and Alaska, provides the key production areas where the bulk of North America's waterfowl nest and rear their young.

Wilderness designation also helps protect diverse refuge areas including islands, lakes, forests, deserts, and mountains. Currently, 20.6 million acres (83,400 km^{2}) of refuge lands have been designated as wilderness under provisions of the Wilderness Act of 1964. The act states that these Congressionally designated areas "shall be administered for the use and enjoyment of the American people in such a manner as will leave them unimpaired for future use and enjoyment as wilderness."
