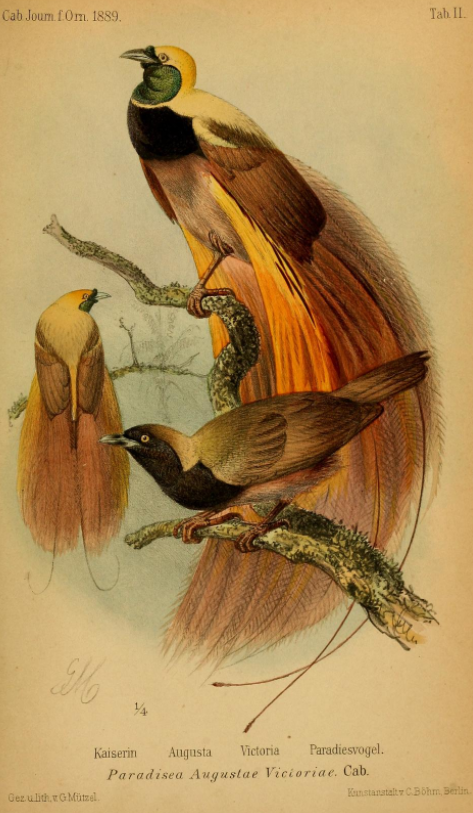

Conservation status
- Least Concern (IUCN 3.1)

Scientific classification
- Kingdom: Animalia
- Phylum: Chordata
- Class: Aves
- Order: Passeriformes
- Family: Paradisaeidae
- Genus: Paradisaea
- Species: P. raggiana
- Subspecies: P. r. augustavictoriae

Trinomial name
- Paradisaea raggiana augustavictoriae Cabanis, 1888

= Empress of Germany's bird of paradise =

Subspecies of bird

The Empress of Germany's bird of paradise, Paradisaea raggiana augustavictoriae, is a large (up to 34-cm-long) maroon brown bird in the family Paradisaeidae, one of three families of birds known as birds of paradise. The male has a dark emerald green throat, yellow crown, pale brown below and narrow yellow throat collar. It closely resembles the crimson-plumed Raggiana bird-of-paradise, but has apricot orange rather than crimson flank plumes. The female is an overall brown bird with yellow head and dark brown face.

The Empress of Germany's bird of paradise is distributed and endemic to the upper Ramu River and Huon Peninsula of northeastern Papua New Guinea. The male is polygamous and displays in communal lek. The diet consists mainly of fruits, insects and arthropods.

One of the most heavily hunted birds of paradise in the plume hunting era, the Empress of Germany's bird of paradise was the first bird of paradise to breed in captivity. It was bred by Prince R. S. Dharmakumarsinhji of India in 1940.

The name commemorates the German Empress and queen consort of Prussia, Augusta Victoria of Schleswig-Holstein.

In the wild, the Empress of Germany's bird of paradise is hybridized with the emperor bird-of-paradise, with at least six specimens known. Thought to be a new species, the hybrid was named Maria's bird-of-paradise, Paradisaea maria or Frau Reichenow's bird-of-paradise.
