= Pelican Island National Wildlife Refuge =

United States National Wildlife Refuge in Florida

- IUCN category IV (habitat/species management area)
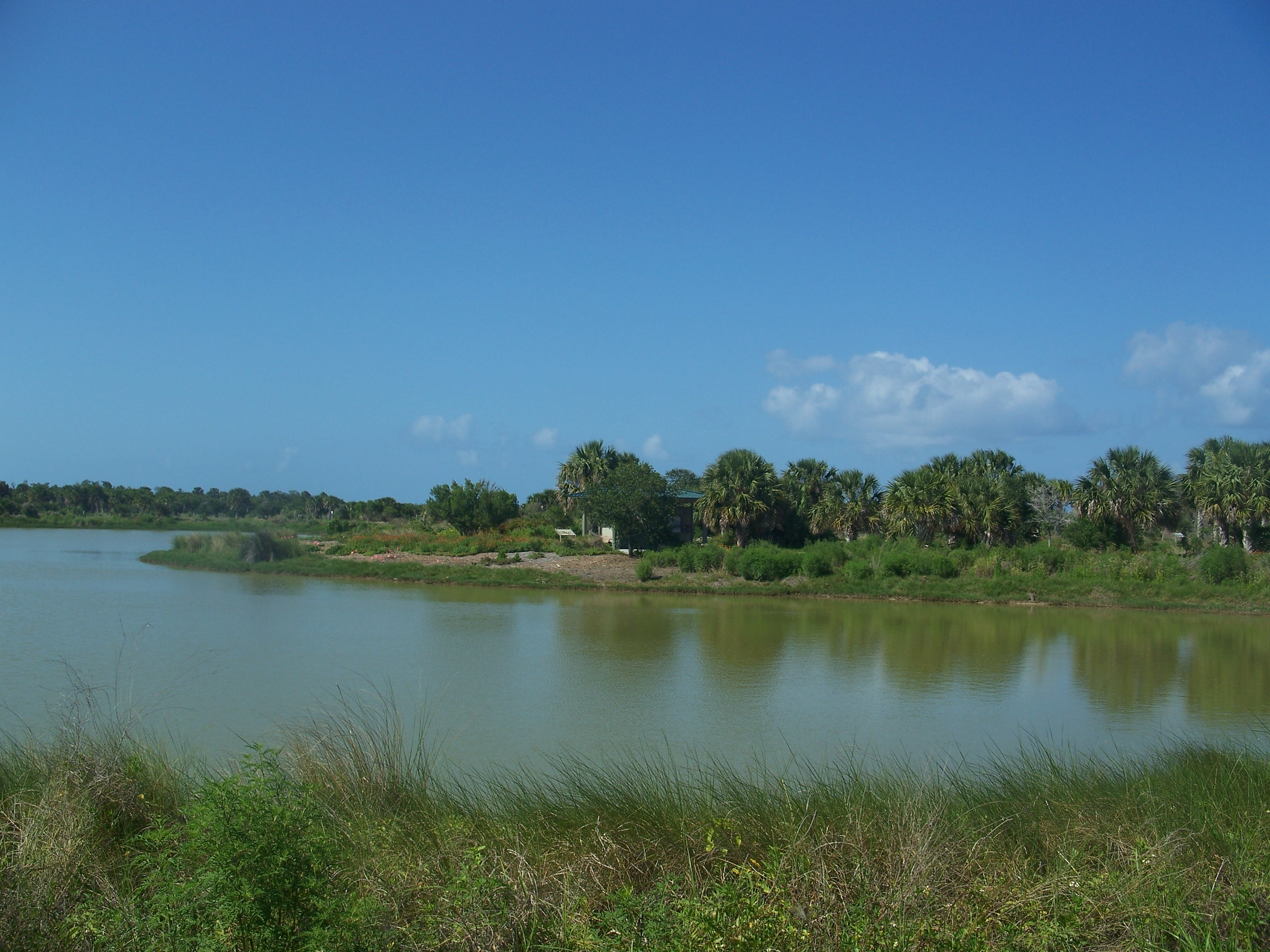
- View from Centennial Trail, Orchid, Florida

- Location within Florida
- Area: 5,376 acres (21.76 km^{2})
- Established: March 14, 1903
- Website: Pelican Island National Wildlife Refuge

Ramsar Wetland
- Designated: 14 March 1993
- Reference no.: 590

- Pelican Island National Wildlife Refuge
- U.S. National Register of Historic Places
- U.S. National Historic Landmark
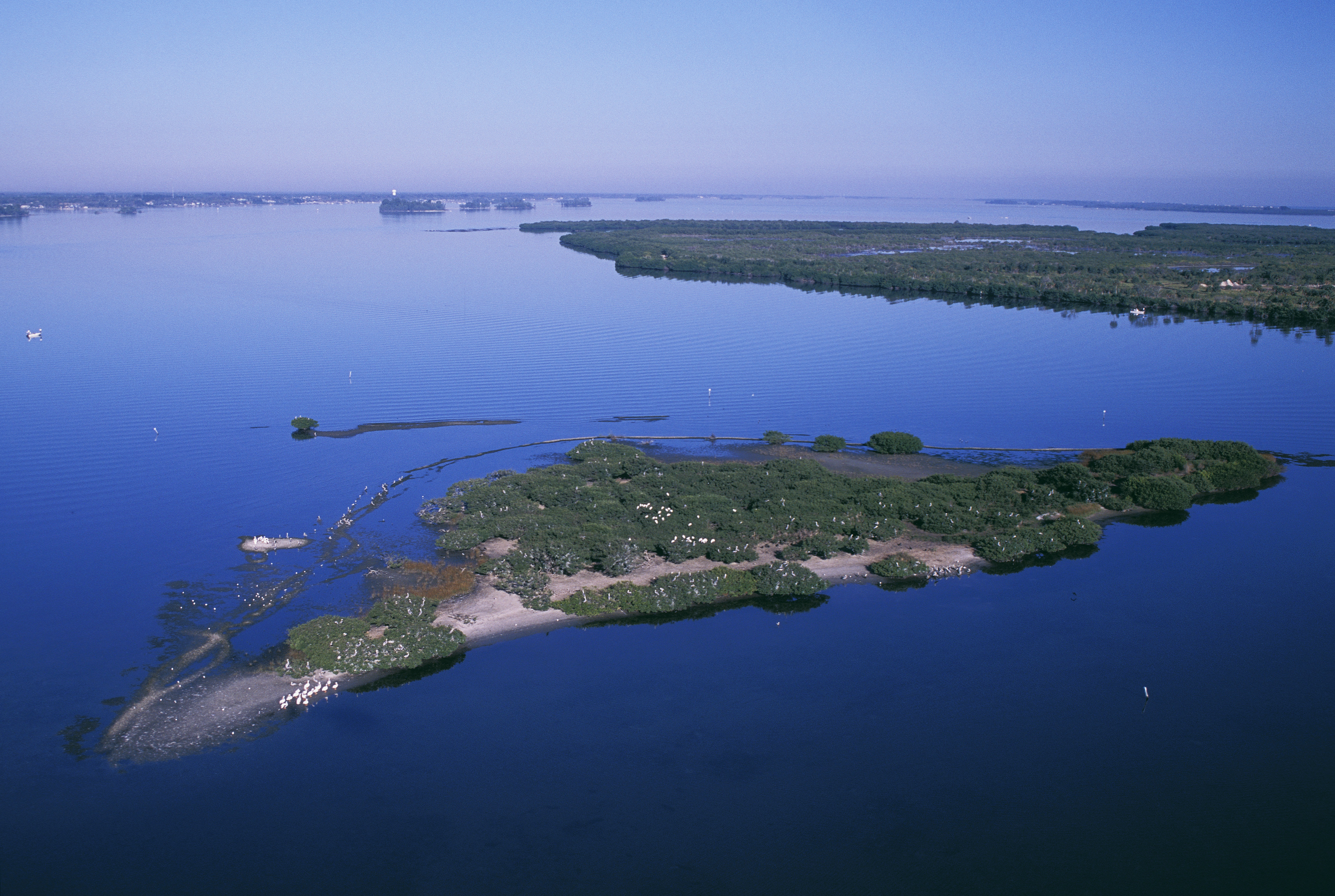
- Aerial view

- Location within Florida Location within the United States
- Location: Indian River County, Florida, United States
- Nearest city: Sebastian, Florida
- Coordinates: 27°48′36″N 80°26′28″W
- Area: 5,376 acres (2,176 ha)
- Built: 1903
- NRHP reference No.: 66000265

Significant dates
- Added to NRHP: October 15, 1966
- Designated NHL: May 23, 1963

Pelican Island National Wildlife Refuge is a United States National Wildlife Refuge (NWR), and part of the Everglades Headwaters NWR complex, located just off the western coast of Orchid Island, Florida in the Indian River Lagoon east of Sebastian, Florida. The refuge consists of a 3-acre (12,000 m^{2}) island that includes an additional 2.5 acres (10,000 m^{2}) of surrounding water and is located off the east coast of Florida of the Indian River Lagoon. Established by an executive order of President Theodore Roosevelt on March 14, 1903, Pelican Island was the first National wildlife refuge in the United States. It was created to protect egrets and other birds from extinction through plume hunting.

== Management ==
Pelican Island is administered as part of the 8,000-acre (3,200 ha) Everglades Headwaters NWR complex along with Archie Carr NWR, Lake Wales Ridge NWR, and the Everglades Headwaters NWR and Conservation Area, created in 2012 (556th unit of the National Wildlife Refuge System) with a 10-acre (4.0 ha) donation and other lands covering approximately 150,000 acres (61,000 ha) north of Lake Okeechobee. 100,000 acres (40,000 ha) will be held under "conservation easement"s through the U.S. Department of the Interior and the U.S. Fish and Wildlife Service. This allows landowners the right to retain ownership of the land, with the ability to continue farming or ranching, ensuring that the land can't be subdivided or developed.

Pelican Island NWR has been placed on the List of Ramsar wetlands of international importance along with other areas of wetlands in the United States.

== History ==
In 1860 census listed population of two people and in the 1880 census listed that less than 30 individuals lived in the St. Sebastian River area. Pelican Island's bird populations were threatened because of increased American settlement around the area in the mid-19th century. Many of the exotic birds were killed for their feathers, used in the fashion industry. Plumes from the birds were used to adorn ladies' hats of the day and at the time were worth more than their weight in gold.

Paul Kroegel, a German immigrant, moved to Florida in 1881 and lived on the west bank of Indian River Lagoon. He was fascinated with the pelicans on the island. Being able to see the island from his home, Paul would watch the pelicans and other water birds. He eventually took an interest in the island and its protection. However, there was not any state or federal law to help him so he took control of the situation himself. Kroegel sailed to the island to stand guard and protect the birds and the island.

A few naturalists visited Kroegel at Pelican Island. A curator at the American Museum of Natural History in New York, Frank Chapman, was one of the naturalists showing interest in the island as well. He discovered that Pelican Island was one of the last rookeries of brown pelicans on the eastern coast of Florida.

The American Ornithologists' Union and the Florida Audubon Society led a campaign to pass legislation for protection of non-game birds in 1901. Knowing that the protection of Pelican Island would require more legislation, Chapman and his fellow advocate, William Dutcher went to President Theodore Roosevelt at his home in New York. The two appealed their case to Roosevelt's conservative ethics. On 14 March 1903, President Roosevelt signed an executive order that established Pelican Island as the first federal bird reservation. This was the first time that the federal government put land aside for the sake of wildlife. The area, however, was open for big game hunters. Kroegel was hired as the first national wildlife refuge manager until 1926. He was paid $1 per month by the Audubon Society, as Congress had not made financial provisions for the refuge.

=== Recent threats ===
During the 1960s, Pelican Island was threatened by attempts to sell the surrounding wetlands and islands to developers. Local citizens led a fight to protect Pelican Island by stopping the sale of the wetlands. The Indian River Area Preservation League, formed by local citrus growers, commercial fishermen, and sportsmen, joined with Florida Audubon Society to convince the State to include the islands as a part of the refuge. "Later in 1963, Pelican Island was designated as a National Historic Landmark by the Secretary of the Interior because of its status as the first federal area set aside specifically to protect wildlife." In 1968, Florida agreed to expand to include nearly 5000 acres (20 km^{2}) of mangrove islands and other submerged lands. In 1970, Pelican Island became the smallest wilderness area in the National Wilderness Preservation System at 3 acres. Since, the refuge has gained over 500 acres (2 km^{2}) through purchases, management agreements, and conservation easements to provide a buffer against encroaching development and also to be a link to the Archie Carr National Wildlife Refuge. Pelican Island National Wildlife Refuge was added to the list of wetlands of international importance under the Ramsar Convention signed in 1971.

Today, Pelican Island is also threatened by shoreline development. Shoreline development has many negative impacts associated with it. Shoreline development can reduce the water quality by increasing the runoff of sediments, fertilizers, and pesticides. These runoffs will cause decline in water quality, and this can directly affect the food base that sustains the island's nesting bird colonies. Waterfront development will also lead to more boat traffic. This extra boat traffic will also negatively affect the birds on the coast. Not only this, development of the shorelines of Pelican Island will permanently flaw the pristine character of this unique National Historic Landmark.

=== Budget cuts ===
Pelican Island, along with many other wildlife refuges, has been experiencing budget cuts. Many problems arise from the stagnant budget and lack of maintenance in the wildlife refuges. These are vital to preserve the habitat and the wildlife and to provide public education and recreation. This situation worsened further because of the failure of congress to timely pass federal funding bills.

Staffing at Pelican Island is made up of U.S. Fish and Wildlife Service. The staff members have recently fallen from six to two which has had many negative consequences. The cuts have led to limiting refuge work and restricting public visitation. Another consequence is the end of 14-year tradition of the wildlife festival. Pelican Island will be losing its only public-use staff and eliminating all active outreach at the nation's first wildlife refuge. Pelican Island Refuge manager and project leader Paul Tritaik said in 2006 that reductions to a full-time staff would lead to the end of some refuge activities and the loss of several trails.

== Physical environment ==
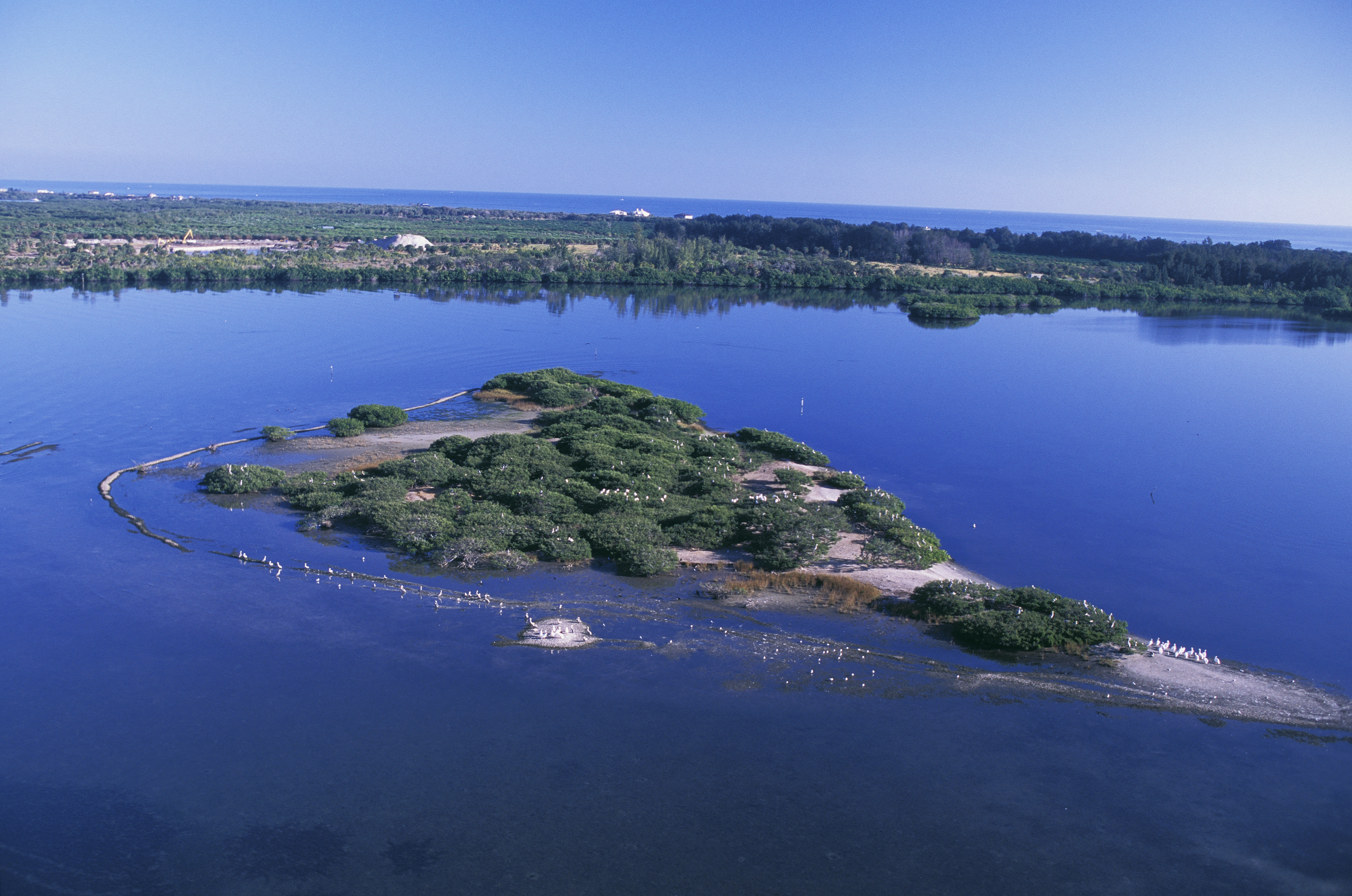
Aerial of Pelican Island National Wildlife Refuge

The environment of Pelican Island consists of climate, topography, geology, air quality, and waterways.

=== Climate ===
The climate at Pelican Island NWR is subtropical and temperate and experiences an average temperate of 67 °F (19 °C). Pelican Island has long, warm, and humid summers and short, mild winters and has an average rainfall of about 55 to 60 inches (140 to 150 cm) annually. Pelican Island may experience tropical storms in the period from May to November.

=== Topography ===
The elevation of Pelican Island changes from east to west. It rises sharply from sea level to about 15 feet (5 m) and then drops back down more slowly to below sea level in the Indian River Lagoon. The land between the Indian River Lagoon and St. Sebastian River is 20 feet (6 m). Even further west, there is an ancient dune that rises in elevation from 20 feet (6 m) to 30 feet (9 m).

=== Geology ===
The landscape of Pelican Island area is made of Pleistocene (glacial) and Holocene (recent) origin. Submerged lands were exposed during the late Pleistocene period, allowing for the spread of flora and fauna from the peninsula. Wetlands, salt marshes, mangroves, and other swampy formations make up the uplands and submerged lands.

==== Soil ====
"The general soils in the Pelican Island Refuge are Canaveral-Captiva-Palm Beach, which is characterized by the gently sloping, somewhat poorly drained to moderately drained sandy soils with shell fragments, and McKee-Quartzipsamments-St. Augustine, which is characterized by level, somewhat poorly drained soils mixed with sand and shell fragments." Other soils include Canaveral Fine Sand, Quartzipsamments, Captiva Fine Sand, McKee Mucky Clay Loam, and Kesson Muck.

=== Air quality ===
Good air quality is vital for the refuge to maintain itself. A few problems dealing with air pollution are carbon monoxide, lead, nitrogen dioxide, ozone, particulate matter, and sulfur dioxide. The primary producers of these pollutants are vehicle emissions, power plants, and industrial activities. The Indian River Lagoon area is said to have good air quality. Sometimes occasional temperate increases can temporarily degrade the air quality below the accepted levels.

=== Waterways ===
The Indian River Lagoon stretches from Ponce de Leon south of Daytona Beach to Jupiter Inlet near West Palm Beach, a distance of about 155 miles (249 km), and contains a number of small rivers, creeks, and canals. The Intracoastal Waterway is the deepest part of the Lagoon. St. Sebastian River and Turkey Creek provide freshwater to the Lagoon. Water quality is also a concern in the refuge: cadmium, lead, mercury, nutrients, selenium, thallium, and dissolved oxygen. The water circulation is affected by the Intracoastal Waterway, winds, inlets, and causeways. Within the refuge boundary, the water quality is generally better compared to portions of the Lagoon.

== Wildlife ==
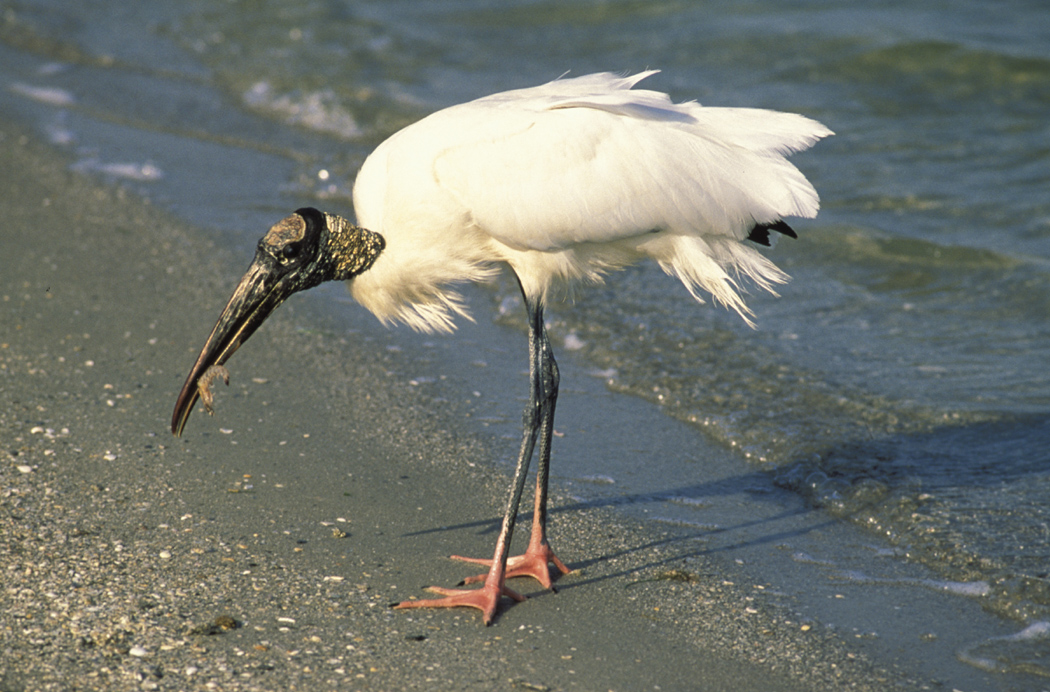
Wood stork (Mycteria americana) feeding

Pelican Island National Wildlife Refuge holds hundreds of species of animals including birds, fish, plants, and mammals. The wetlands of Pelican Island are a major ecological system supporting the huge biological diversity. Fifteen federally listed threatened and endangered species live in Pelican Island NWR and around Indian River Lagoon. Of the endangered species, West Indian manatees and sea turtles occupy parts of the lagoon. Around the lagoon in the refuge are two wood stork refuges. These birds along with other wading birds that nest on the island thrive on the tremendous fish population. Pelican Island is home to many nesting birds including brown pelicans, great egrets, snowy egrets, reddish egrets, great blue heron, little blue heron, tricolored heron, black-crowned night heron, American white ibis, glossy ibis, double-crested cormorant, anhinga, and American oystercatcher.

=== Visiting ===
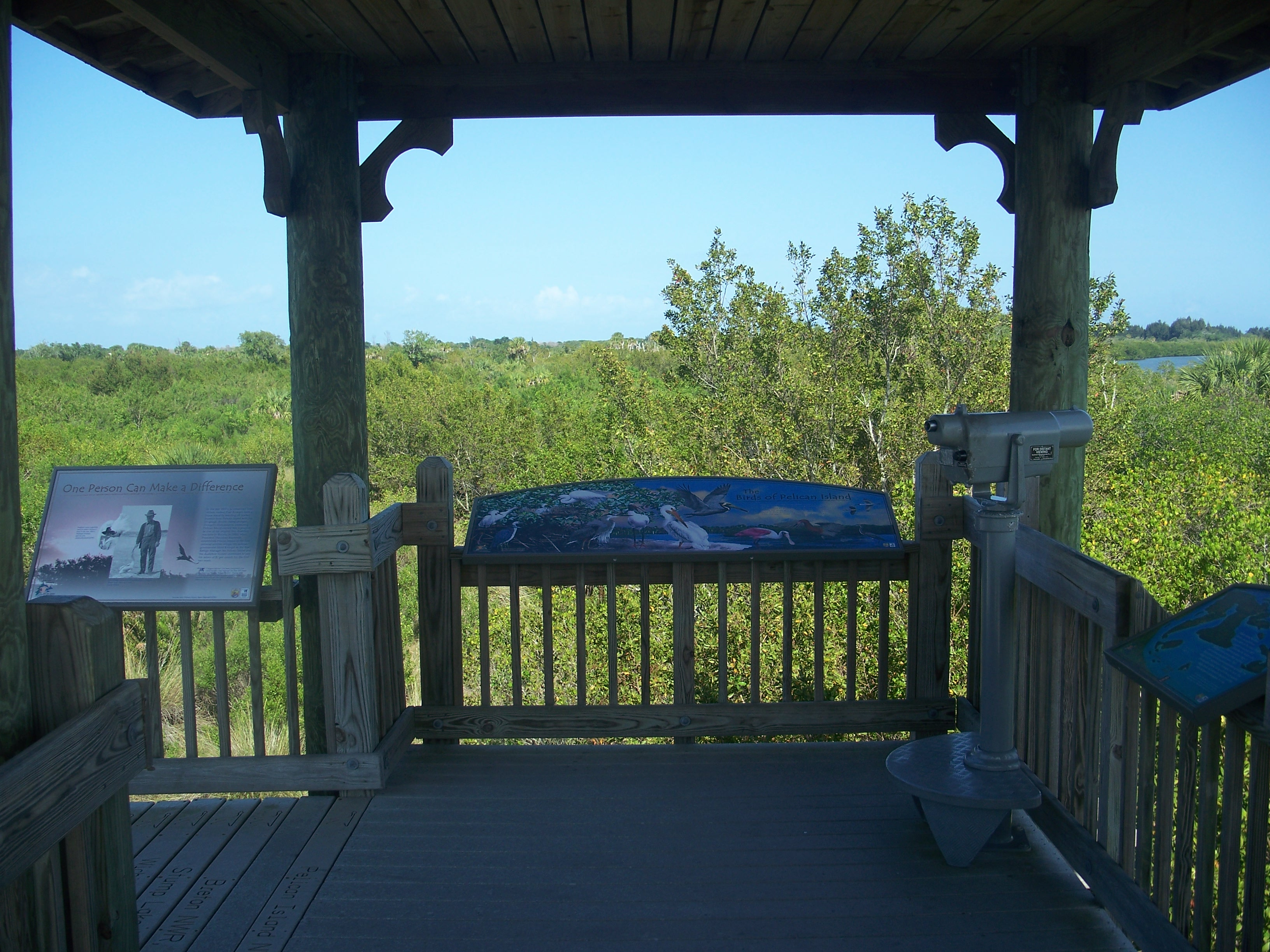
Observation tower

Pelican Island is only accessible by boat or chartered tours. Nesting birds are easily disturbed, so people are not allowed to get too close or to disembark. Visiting during nesting season (late November through late July), one can expect to see brown pelican, wood storks, white ibises, black-crowned night herons, double-crested cormorants, reddish, snowy, and great egrets, and great blue, little blue and tricolored herons. Traveling in the winter, look for lesser scaup, blue-winged teal, mottled ducks, great northern divers, laughing gulls, American white pelicans, and red-breasted mergansers. Summer visitors should watch for roseate spoonbills, magnificent frigatebirds and least terns. Pelican Island also features some marine life in the Indian River including sea turtles, dolphins, and manatees.

New public facilities were opened and dedicated on March 14, 2003, in ceremonies marking the centennial of Pelican Island and the National Wildlife Refuge System. A 37¢ US Commemorative Stamp in honor of the NWR Centennial was issued as part of the celebration. The new facilities include a 1/4 mile boardwalk and 18-foot (5.5 m) observation tower to view Pelican Island, two 2.5-mile (4.0 km) salt marsh impoundment foot trails, interpretive signs, informational kiosks, restrooms and parking areas. The facilities are west of Highway A1A on the north end of Historic Jungle Trail. They were produced through a partnership with Indian River County, St. Johns River Water Management District, Florida Inland Navigation District, Florida Power and Light, ConocoPhillips, Wild Birds Unlimited, the National Fish and Wildlife Foundation, and many others. Future plans include additional boardwalks, an overlook, a photo blind and a wildlife drive.

=== Jungle Trail ===
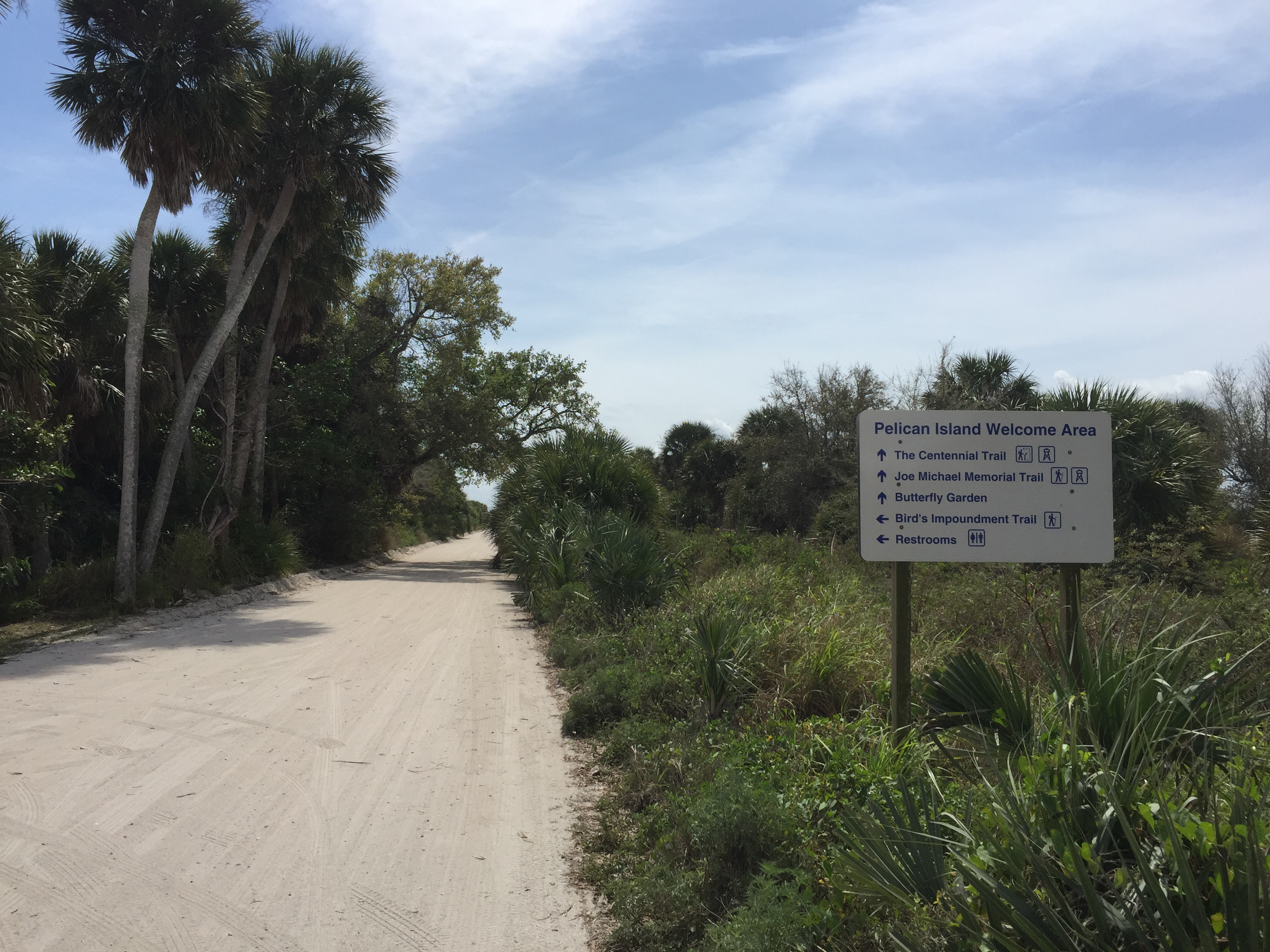
Jungle Trail

The historic Jungle Trail is a 7.8-mile (12.6 km) sandy road with a section that goes through the refuge. Citrus growers originally built this road in the 1920s and it is now on the National Register of Historic Places.

== See also ==
- Florida State Parks
- Indian River County, Florida
- List of National Wildlife Refuges
- History of the National Wildlife Refuge System
