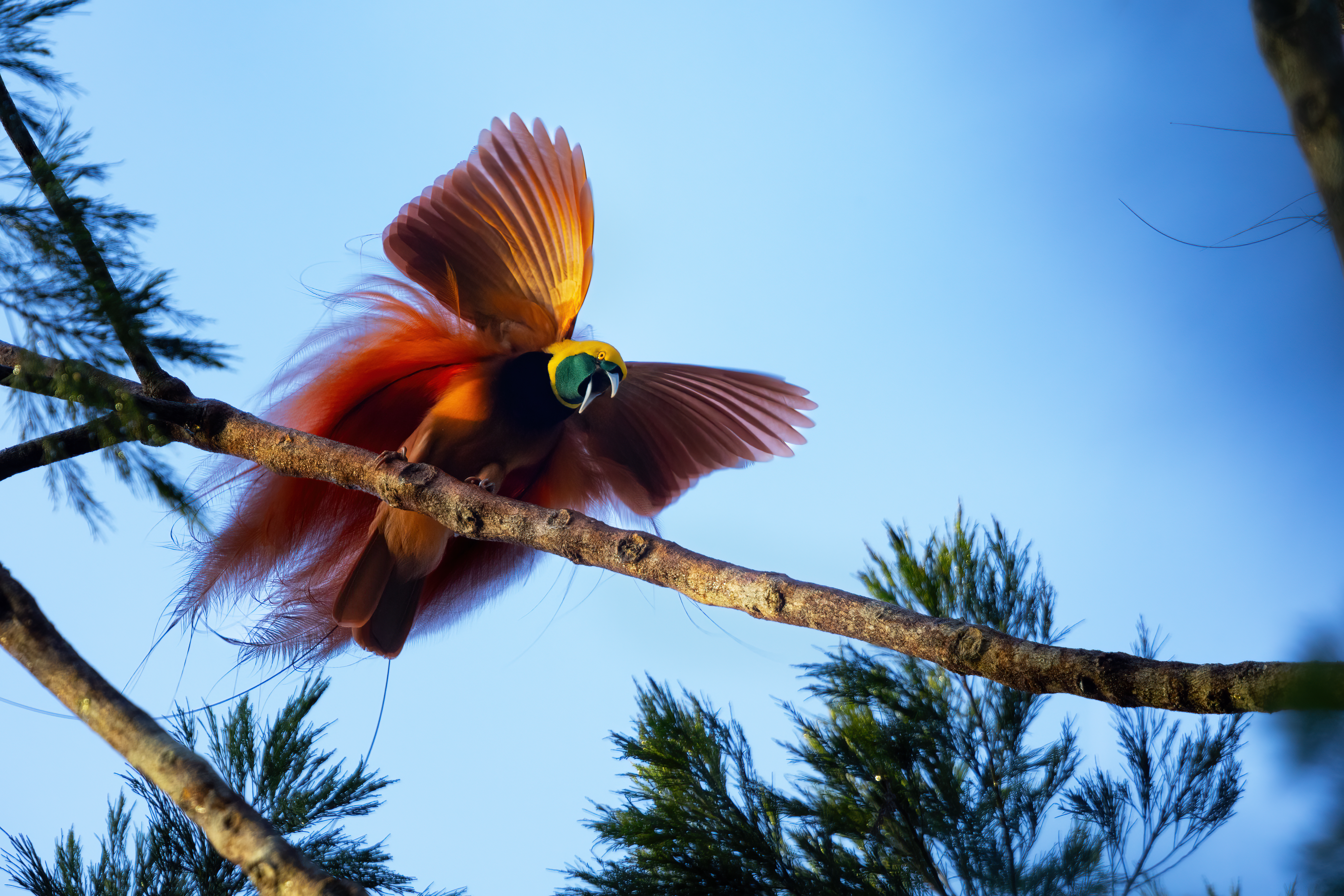
- Male raggiana bird-of-paradise displaying at a lek, Varirata National Park

Conservation status
- Least Concern (IUCN 3.1)

Scientific classification
- Kingdom: Animalia
- Phylum: Chordata
- Class: Aves
- Order: Passeriformes
- Family: Paradisaeidae
- Genus: Paradisaea
- Species: P. raggiana

Binomial name
- Paradisaea raggiana P.L. Sclater, 1873
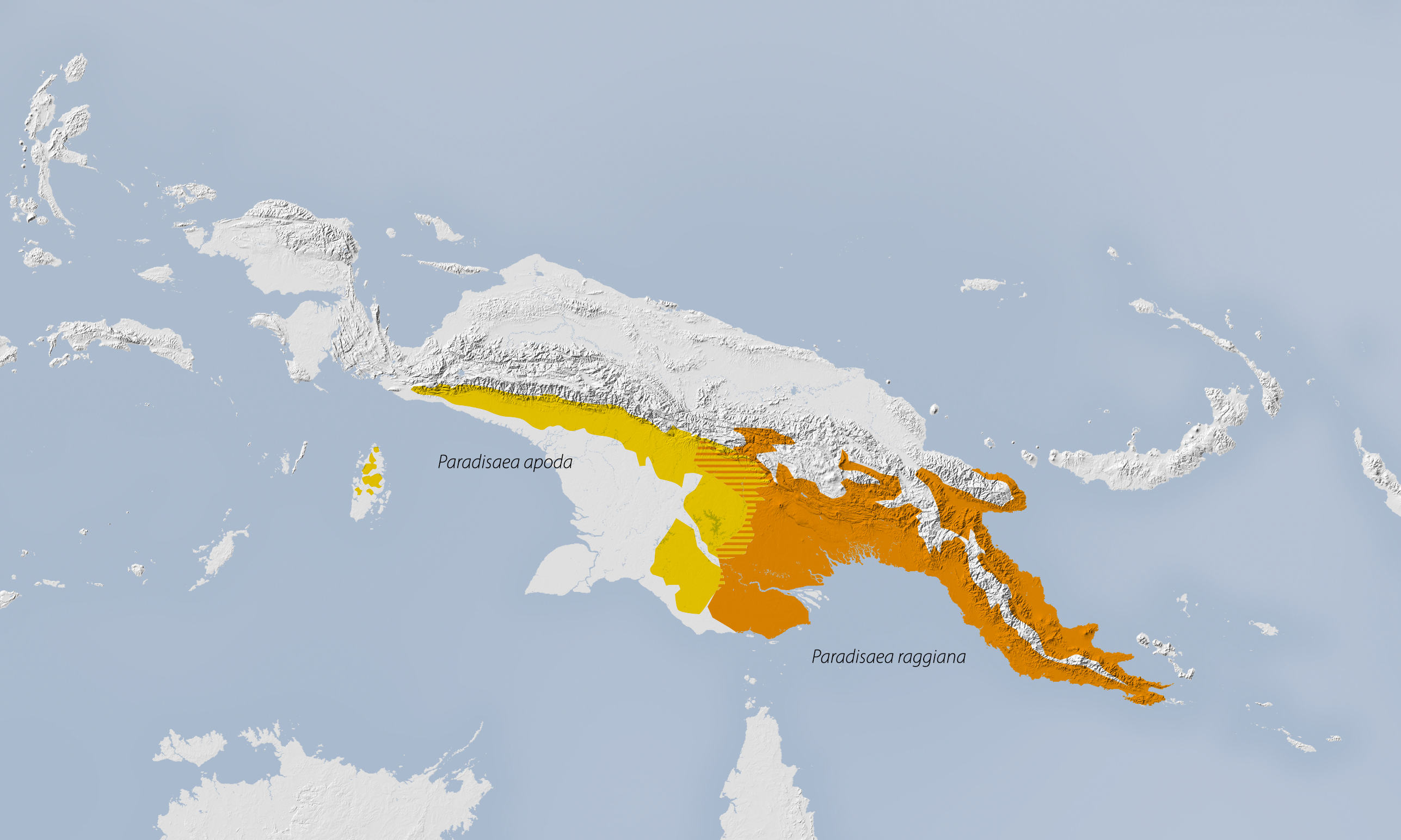
- Paradisaea raggiana Paradisaea apoda

Synonyms
- Gerrus paradisaea

= Raggiana bird-of-paradise =

Species of bird

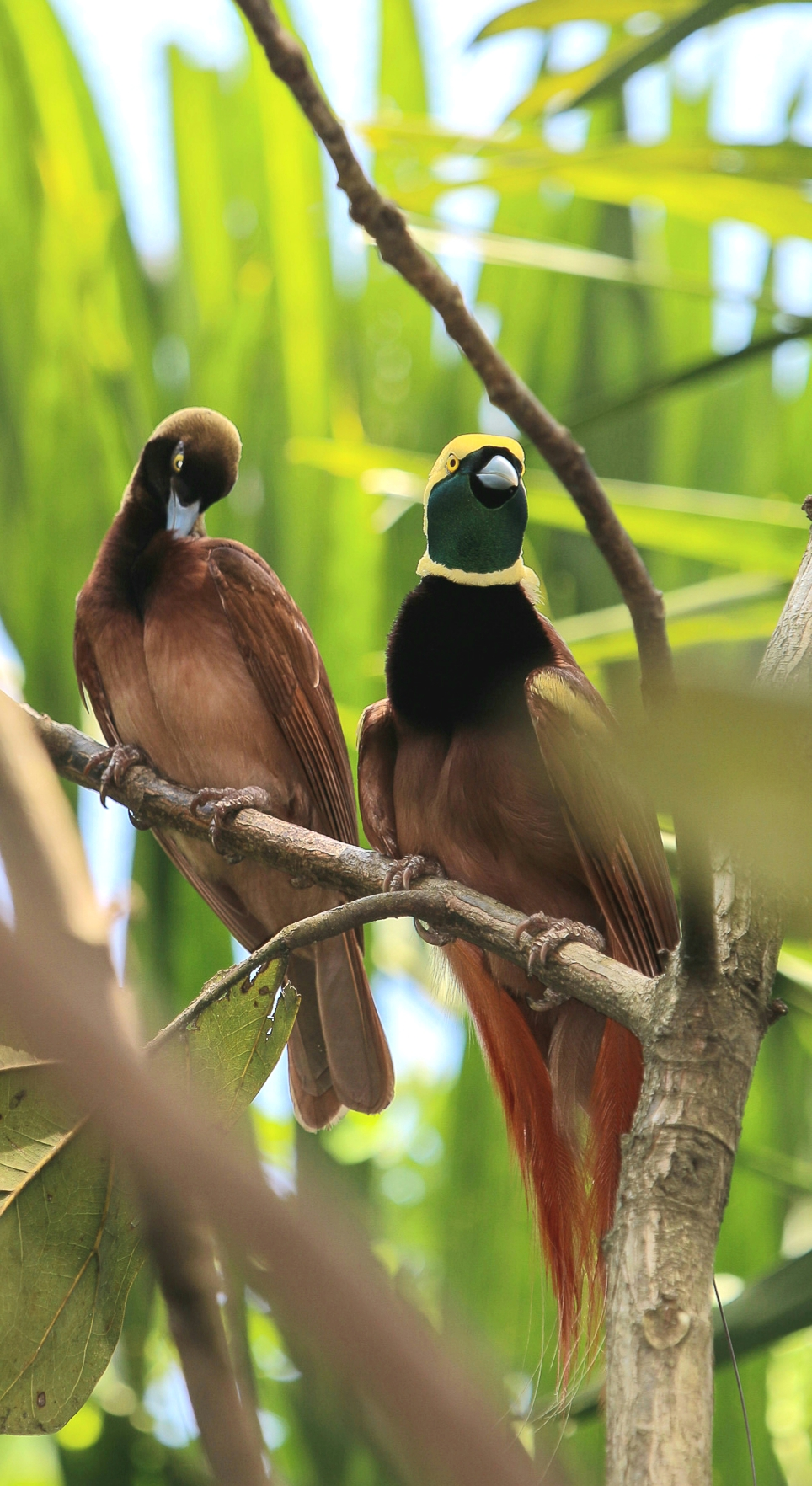
Captive female (left) and male (right)

The Raggiana bird-of-paradise (Paradisaea raggiana), also known as Count Raggi's bird-of-paradise, is a large bird in the bird-of-paradise family Paradisaeidae.

It is distributed widely in southern and northeastern New Guinea, where its name is kumul. It is also known as cenderawasih. As requested by Count Luigi Maria D'Albertis, the epithet raggiana commemorates the Marquis Francesco Raggi of Genoa.

The Raggiana bird-of-paradise is the national bird of Papua New Guinea. In 1971, this species, as Gerrus paradisaea, was made the national emblem and was included on the national flag. "The Kumuls" ("birds-of-paradise" in Tok Pisin) is also the nickname of the country's national rugby league team.

== Description ==
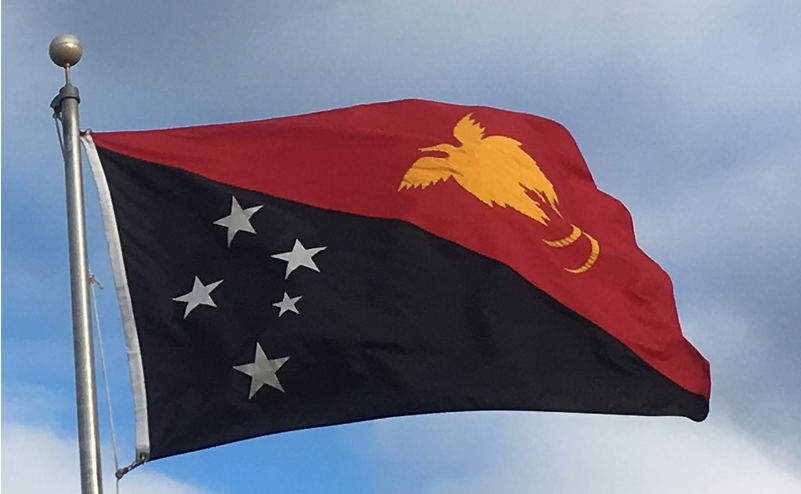
Flag of Papua New Guinea, which features the bird

The Raggiana bird-of-paradise is 34 centimetres (13 in) long. Its overall colour is a maroon-brown, with a greyish-blue bill, yellow iris and greyish-brown feet. The male has a yellow crown, dark emerald-green throat and yellow collar between the throat and its blackish upper breast feathers. It is adorned with a pair of long black tail wires and large flank plumes. The male has the long tail feather while the female does not. The female is a comparatively drab maroonish-brown bird. The ornamental flank plumes vary from red to orange in color, depending on subspecies. The nominate subspecies, P. r. raggiana, has the deepest red plumes, while the subspecies P. r. augustavictoriae of northeast New Guinea, also known as the Empress of Germany's bird of paradise, has apricot-orange plumes.

== Behaviour ==
=== Diet ===
Its diet consists mainly of fruits and arthropods. The species is an important seed disperser of some fruiting trees in New Guinea, and is for some species of mahogany and nutmeg the main fruit disperser.

=== Breeding ===
The breeding system of the Raggiana bird-of-paradise is polygamy. Males congregate in leks (display arenas for visiting females). Leks can be 30–100 meters in diameter. Within the lek there is a group of tall slender trees on which males compete for prominent perches and defend them from rivals. On these perches males do a display which involves clapping wings and shaking the head. The nest is a bowl-shaped structure composed of leaves and leaf pieces, stems, ferns and other plant fibres. It is lined with horsehair-like material and is situated 2–11 m above the ground on tree branches. The position of the nest may be higher in areas where humans disturb the nest. The female usually lays a clutch of one to two (usually two) pinkish buff eggs. The incubation period has been recorded as 18 days in the wild and 20 days in captivity. As in all polygamous birds-of-paradise, the female alone assumes all incubation duties.

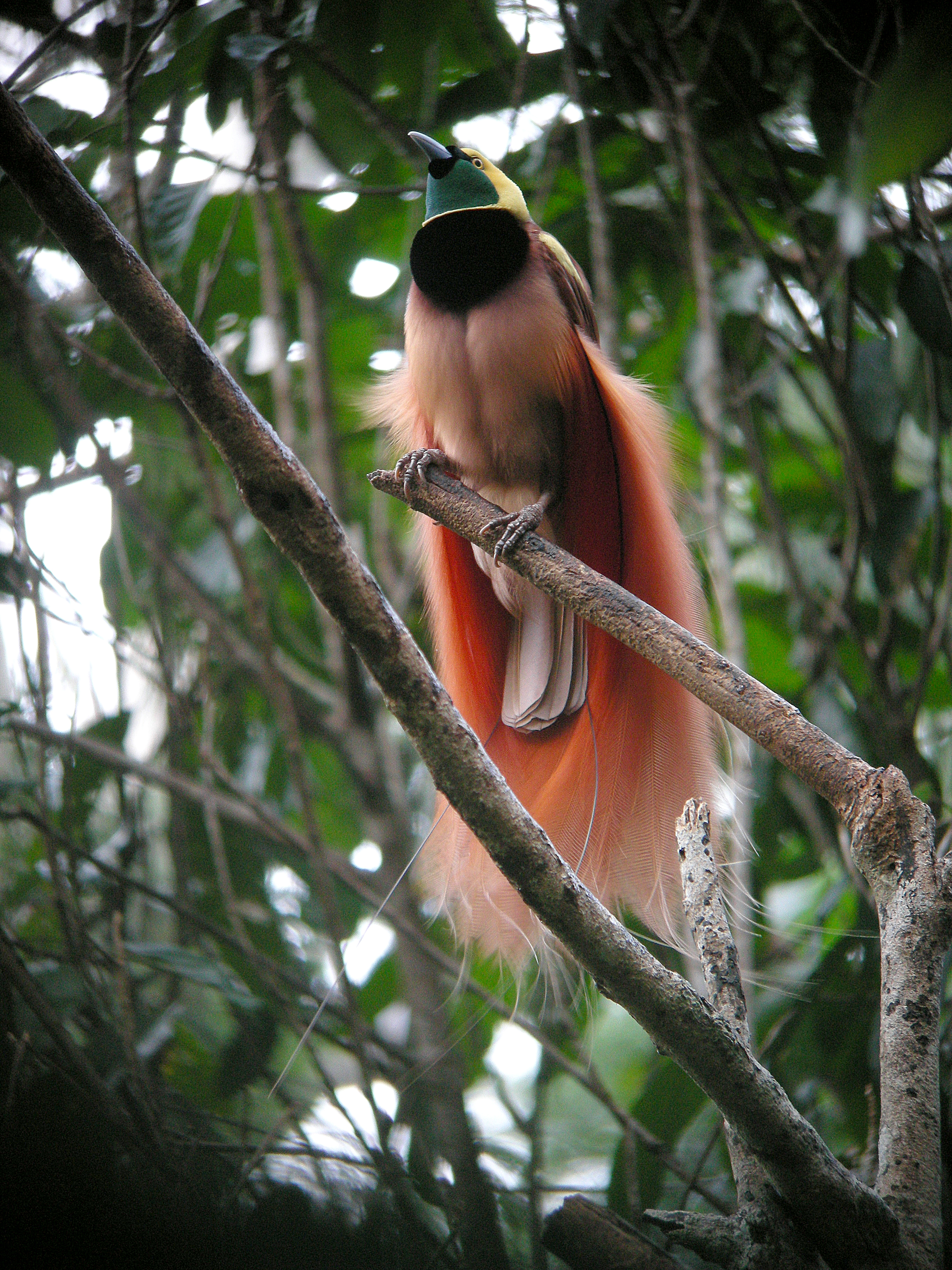
Like others of its family, the male has elaborate breeding plumage used to impress females.

== Status and conservation ==
Widespread and common throughout the tropical forests of eastern New Guinea, the Raggiana bird-of-paradise is evaluated as Least Concern on the IUCN Red List of Threatened Species. It is listed on Appendix II of CITES. Even though the plumes of this species are heavily cropped by natives for ceremonial headdresses, the practice is not a threat to their long-term survival.
