= John Clark Salyer II =

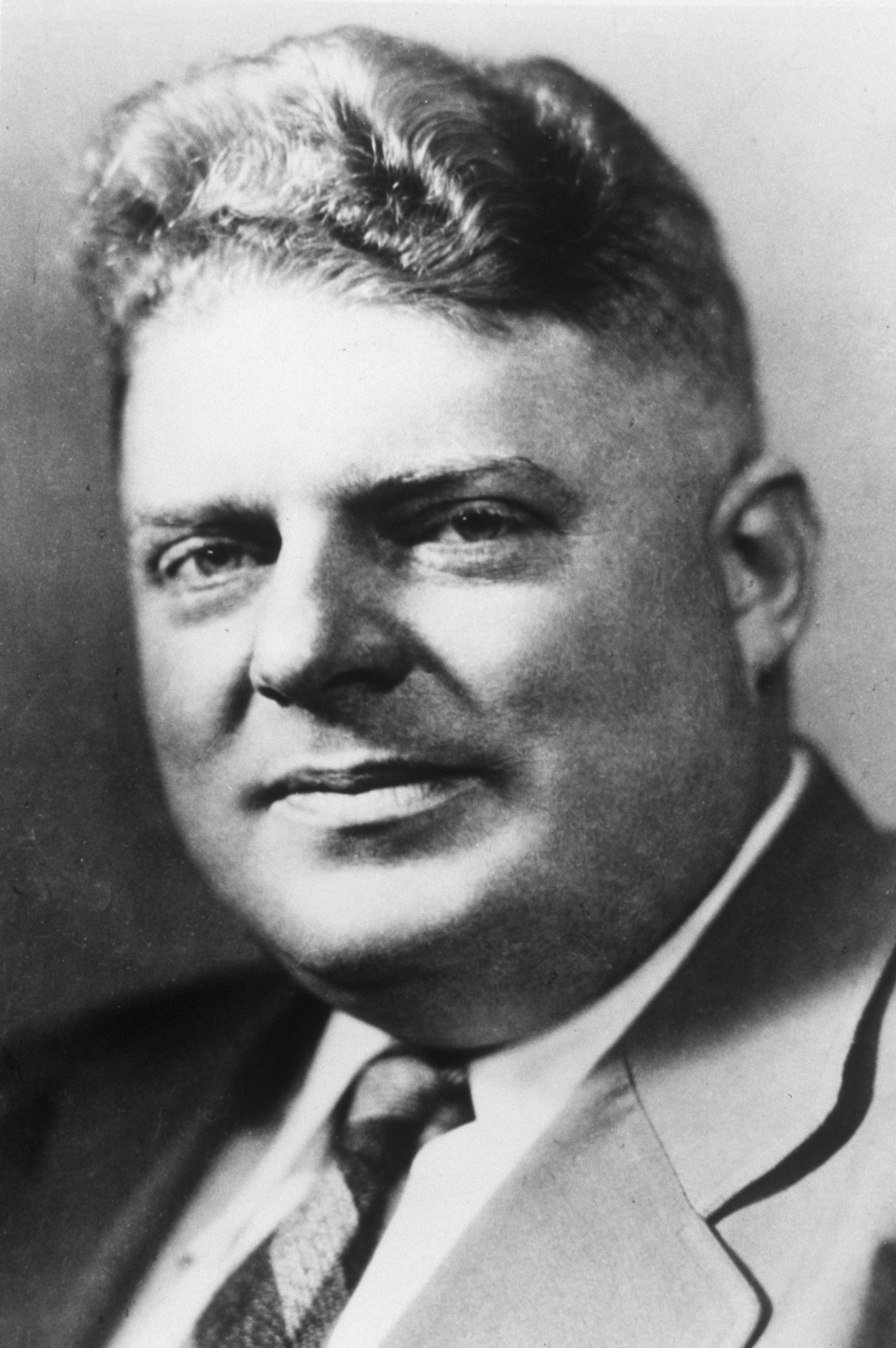
J. Clark Salyer II

John Clark Salyer II (August 16, 1902, in Higginsville, Missouri – August 16, 1966) was an American environmentalist and government administrator.

== Biography ==
After earning a B.A. at Central College in Fayette, Missouri, in 1927, he attended the University of Michigan where he received his MS in 1930. He taught science in the public schools of Parsons, Kansas, and as a Professor of Biology at Bethel College, Newton, Kansas, for several years, before accepting a position with the Iowa Fish and Game Commission in 1933.

Soon after being appointed as the Chief of the Bureau of Biological Survey, Jay Norwood "Ding" Darling began searching for an individual to manage the bureau's fledgling refuge program. Having been acquainted with Salyer's work for a number of years, Darling recruited Salyer in June 1934 to oversee the management of national wildlife refuges. At first, Salyer was reluctant to leave the University of Michigan for a permanent job with the Bureau of Biological Survey in Washington, D.C. According to George Laycock in his book The Sign of the Flying Goose, Darling convinced Salyer to take a year's leave of absence from his position to assess waterfowl projects across the country. Salyer was directed by Darling to develop a waterfowl management program using the conservation principles of wildlife management espoused by Aldo Leopold. Such a program, based on habitat needs of migratory bird species, had never before been attempted on a national scale. Salyer later accepted a permanent position with the Bureau on December 17, 1934.

Shortly after coming to work for the Biological Survey in 1934, the government issued him a car to travel around the country visiting refuges. Salyer had a fear of flying, so this vehicle provided him with the means to visit refuges in far-flung locations. According to Laycock, "within six weeks, he (Salyer) had driven 18,000 miles (29,000 km) and drawn up plans for 600,000 acres (2,400 km²) of new refuge lands." Refuge managers reported that Salyer would drive hundreds of miles each day in his government-issued Oldsmobile to visit their refuge, then stay with the family overnight or for a meal before commencing on his journey to inspect another refuge on his itinerary. His memory of refuges and projects he inspected was remarkably clear until the day he died. Even after going blind shortly before his retirement, Salyer could recall the specifics of many of the locations he had visited throughout his career during Congressional and Departmental briefings.

For his efforts as head of the Division of Wildlife Refuges, Salyer has become known as the "Father of the National Wildlife Refuge System". Under his direction, the system rose in area from 1.5 million acres (6,100 km^{2}) in the mid-1930s to nearly 29 million acres (120,000 km^{2}) upon his retirement in 1961. Salyer was the principal architect for President Franklin D. Roosevelt's duck restoration program of 1934–36.

After nearly 30 years of service, health problems forced Salyer into retirement as Chief of Refuge Management in 1961. He maintained his connection with the Fish and Wildlife Service in an advisory capacity until his death on his birthday, August 16, 1966.

In 1966, the Fish and Wildlife Service renamed the Lower Souris National Wildlife Refuge in North Dakota as the J. Clark Salyer National Wildlife Refuge to honor his legacy of contributions to the preservation of America's wildlife.

Salyer is survived by his grandson, John Clark Salyer IV, a constitutional lawyer who has worked for the American Civil Liberties Union, as a Brennen Fellow and as a staff attorney. He is currently the legal director for the Arab American Family Support Center and a professor at Barnard College.

== See also ==
- History of the National Wildlife Refuge System
- J. Clark Salyer National Wildlife Refuge
