= National Wildlife Refuge System Administration Act of 1966 =

- Long title: An Act To provide for the conservation, protection, and propagation of native species of fish and wildlife, including migratory birds, that are threatened with extinction, to consolidate the authorities relating to the administration by the Secretary of the Interior of the National Wildlife Refuge System; and for other purposes
- Enacted by: the 89th United States Congress

Citations
- Public law: Pub. L. 89–669
- Statutes at Large: 80 Stat. 927

Codification
- Titles amended: 16
- U.S.C. sections amended: 668dd, 668ee

Legislative history
- Introduced in the House as H.R. 13881 by John D. Dingell Jr.; Committee consideration by House Merchant Marine and Fisheries; Passed the House on; Passed the Senate on; Signed into law by President Lyndon B. Johnson on October 15, 1966

Major amendments
- National Wildlife Refuge System Improvement Act of 1997

The National Wildlife Refuge System Administration Act of 1966 provided guidelines and directives for administration and management of all areas in National Wildlife Refuge system including "wildlife refuges, areas for the protection and conservation of fish and wildlife that are threatened with extinction, wildlife ranges, game ranges, wildlife management areas, and waterfowl production areas."
