= Afognak Forest =

Former national forest in Alaska, U.S.

Coordinates: 61°15′0″N 149°19′0″W

Afognak Forest and Fish Culture was established by the United States General Land Office in Alaska on December 24, 1892, as a forest preserve. It covered 403,640 acres (1,633.5 km^{2}) in 1905, when the forest reserves were transferred to the U.S. Forest Service. On July 1, 1908, the entire forest was combined with Chugach National Forest and the name was discontinued.
