= Paul Kroegel =

German-American conservationists (1864–1948)

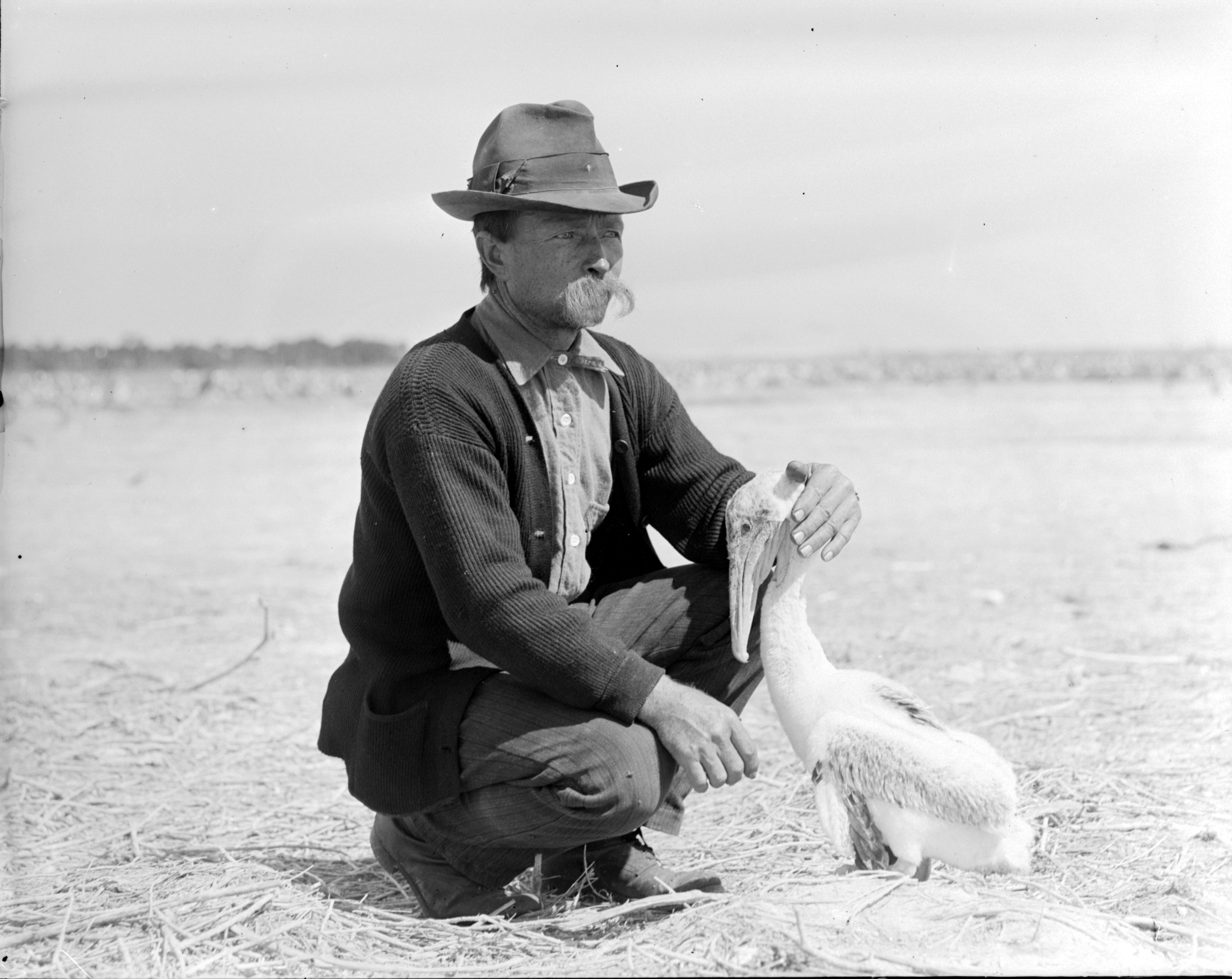
- Paul Kroegel with a brown pelican located on the Pelican Island National Wildlife Refuge. Image taken in 1907.
- Born: January 9, 1864; Chemnitz, Kingdom of Saxony
- Died: January 1948 (aged 83–84); Sebastian, Florida, United States
- Monuments: Paul Kroegel memorial in Sebastian, Florida
- Known for: Bird conservation on Pelican Island
- Father: Gottlieb Kroegel
- Relatives: Arthur Kroegel (brother)

Paul Kroegel (January 9, 1864 – 1948) was a German immigrant to the United States who helped establish Pelican Island as a bird sanctuary in Florida. Kroegel is listed as a Great Floridian. He was a founding member of the St. Lucie County Board of Commissioners in 1905. He died in Sebastian, Florida in 1948.

== Life ==
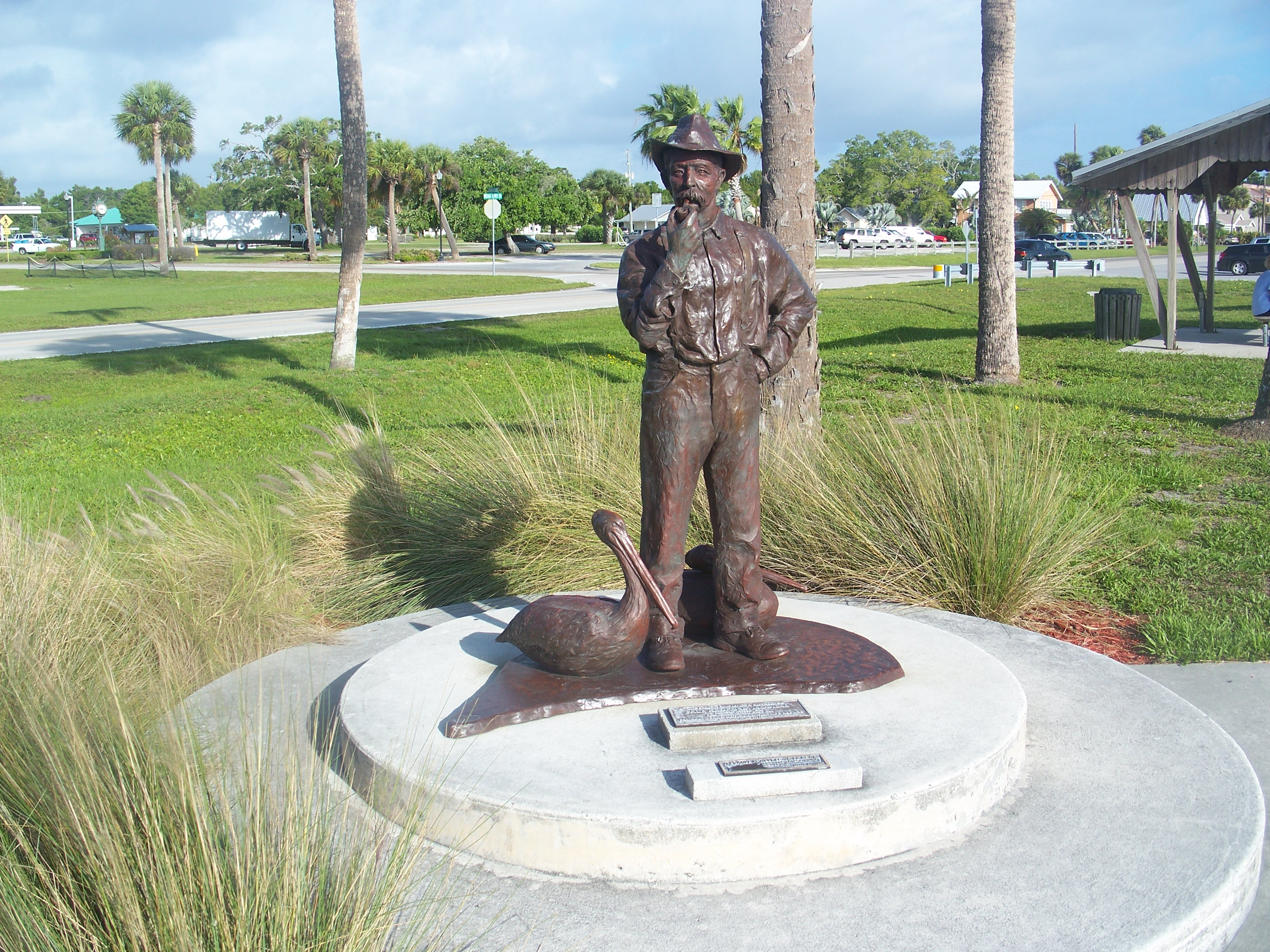
The Paul Kroegel memorial located in Sebastian, Florida.

Kroegel was born in the city of Chemnitz, Kingdom of Saxony. He arrived in Sebastian, Florida in 1881 and homesteaded with his brother, Arthur, and their father Gottlieb Kroegel, on a shell midden on the west bank of the Indian River Lagoon overlooking Pelican Island. The island consisted of a five-acres of mangrove where thousands of brown pelicans (Pelecanus occidentalis) and other water birds would roost and nest. Kroegel protected the island's avian inhabitants with his shotgun and would stand guard at a time when neither state nor federal laws protected the animals.

Influential naturalists visited and stayed at the nearby Oak Lodge from the 1880s to the early 1900s, including American ornithologist Frank Chapman who is the curator at the American Museum of Natural History in New York. In 1901, the American Ornithologists' Union and the Florida Audubon Society led efforts to pass legislation in Florida calling for the protection of non-game birds. Kroegel was one of four wardens hired by the Florida Audubon Society to protect water birds from market hunters. Two of the wardens were murdered doing this work. Additional protections were granted by president Theodore Roosevelt who signed an executive order on 14 March 1903, establishing Pelican Island as the first federal bird reservation, part of a network of 55 bird reservation and national game preserved for wildlife that were forerunners to the national wildlife refuge system. Kroegel was hired as the first national wildlife refuge warden until 1926. He was paid $1 per month by the Audubon Society, as Congress had not made financial provisions for the refuge.
