= Raol Shree Dharmakumarsinhji =

Indian ornithologist, environmentalist (1917–1986)

Raol Shree Dharmakumarsinhji (April 1917 – January 1986) was an Indian ornithologist, environmentalist and writer as well as a ruling prince. His elder brother Krishna Kumarsinhji Bhavsinhji was the last Maharaja of the Bhavnagar State in western India.

== Early years ==
Orphaned at the age of two, Dharmakumarsinhji studied under an English tutor before attending Rajkumar College in Rajkot. He then joined Harrow School in England, where he became the under-14 fencing champion.

== Ornithology ==
Dharmakumarsinhji had wide-ranging interests and talents. He emerged as a pioneer in the field of Indian wildlife photography as well as an amateur painter, having won numerous awards in both fields. In his youth, he was an enthusiastic hunter, a collector of avian eggs, and also a keen falconer with an exquisite collection of birds from the genus Falco. His interest in birds led him to undertake field studies of the Great Indian Bustard and the Lesser Florican.

== Conservation ==
In 1950, the Government of India appointed him to conduct biogeographical surveys across five Indian states – Gujarat, Madhya Pradesh, Maharashtra, Rajasthan and Punjab – and make recommendations on areas suitable for conversion into designated national parks and wildlife sanctuaries. Over the next three decades, he held several conservation-related government positions in India. He served as India's first Honorary Wildlife Warden, Vice Chairman of the Indian Board for Wildlife, and a member of the Rajasthan and Gujarat Wildlife Advisory Boards.

== Publications ==
As well as many papers in journals, such as the Journal of the Bombay Natural History Society, books authored by Dharmakumarsinhji include:

- Birds of Saurashtra. 1955. Bombay: Dil Bahar
- Sixty Indian Birds (with K S Lavkumar). 1972. New Delhi: Ministry of Information and Broadcasting, Government of India
- Reminiscences of Indian Wildlife. 2000. Mumbai: Oxford University Press India. ISBN 9780195651676
