= Westlake, Florida =

- City
- City of Westlake
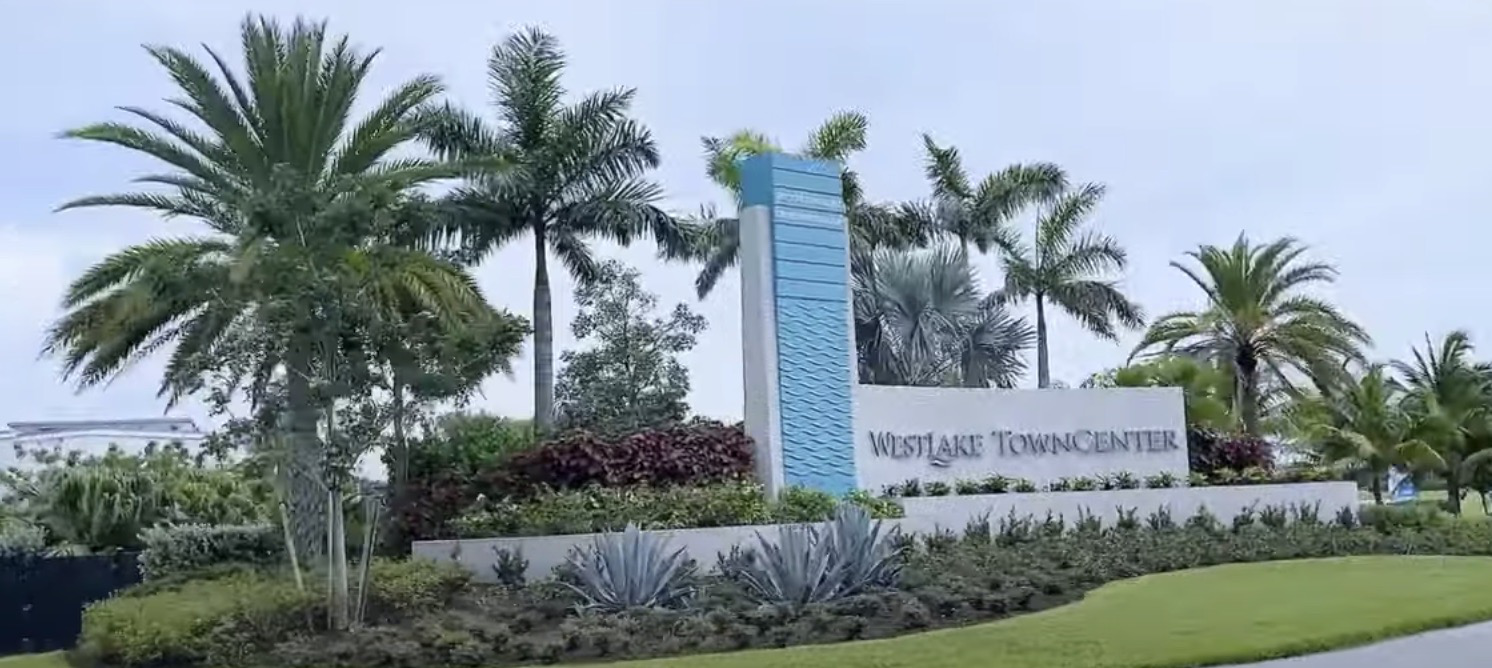

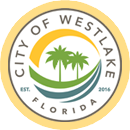
- Seal
- Interactive map of Westlake, Florida
- Coordinates: 26°45′02″N 80°17′41″W
- Country: United States
- State: Florida
- County: Palm Beach
- Settled (Seminole Improvement District): c. Early 1960s
- Founded (Westlake): September 2014
- Incorporated (City of Westlake): June 22, 2016
- Named for: Weston, Florida

Government
  - Type: Council-Manager
  - Mayor: JohnPaul O'Connor
  - Vice Mayor: Greg Langowski
  - Councilors: Gary Werner, Erik Gleason, and Charlotte Leonard
  - City Manager: Odet Izquierdo
  - City Clerk: Zoie P. Burgess, CMC

Area
  - Total: 6.55 sq mi (16.97 km^{2})
  - Land: 6.37 sq mi (16.49 km^{2})
  - Water: 0.19 sq mi (0.49 km^{2})
- Elevation: 16 ft (4.9 m)

Population (2020)
  - Total: 906
  - Estimate (2025): 9,042
  - Density: 142.3/sq mi (54.95/km^{2})
- Time zone: UTC-5 (Eastern (EST))
  - Summer (DST): UTC-4 (EDT)
- ZIP codes: 33470, 33411
- Area codes: 561, 728
- FIPS code: 12-76417
- GNIS ID: 2786554
- Website: www.westlakegov.com

Westlake is a city and the 39th municipality in Palm Beach County, Florida, United States. It is part of the Miami metropolitan area of South Florida. The population was 906 at the 2020 US Census.

== History ==
The city was previously farmland known as the Seminole Improvement District that began in the early 1960s, but renamed Westlake when real estate development started in September 2014, after Minto Communities purchased 3,800 acres a year before (September 2013) for $51 million, and later bought an additional 200 acres in 2014. The City of Westlake officially became the 39th municipality in Palm Beach County on June 22, 2016. It was named, in part, as a nod to Weston in neighboring Broward County, a similar large-scale community planned by JMB Realty and the Arvida company in the 1980s, and because both cities have many artificial lakes. In November 2019, Wellington Regional Medical Center purchased 35 acres for $12.3 million to establish a presence in the community.

== Geography ==
The approximate coordinates for the City of Westlake is located in north-central Palm Beach County.

The City of Westlake is located north of Loxahatchee Groves and Lion Country Safari, south of The Acreage, east of the Lake Okeechobee region and its farmlands, northwest of Royal Palm Beach, and west of Loxahatchee.

=== Climate ===
The City of Westlake has a tropical climate, similar to the climate found in much of the Caribbean. It is part of the only region in the 48 contiguous states that falls under that category. More specifically, it generally has a tropical savanna climate (Köppen climate classification: Aw), bordering a tropical monsoon climate (Köppen climate classification: Am).

== Demographics ==
Historical population
Census	Pop.	Note	%±
2010	5		—
2020	906		18,020.0%
2025 (est.)	9,042		898.0%
U.S. Decennial Census

=== Racial and ethnic composition ===
Westlake city, Florida – Racial and ethnic composition Note: the US Census treats Hispanic/Latino as an ethnic category. This table excludes Latinos from the racial categories and assigns them to a separate category. Hispanics/Latinos may be of any race.
Race / Ethnicity (NH = Non-Hispanic)	Pop 2020	2020
White alone (NH)	396	43.71%
Black or African American alone (NH)	159	17.55%
Native American or Alaska Native alone (NH)	0	0.00%
Asian alone (NH)	44	4.86%
Native Hawaiian or Pacific Islander alone (NH)	0	0.00%
Other race alone (NH)	9	0.99%
Mixed race or Multiracial (NH)	39	4.30%
Hispanic or Latino (any race)	259	28.59%
Total	906	100.00%

=== 2020 census ===
As of the 2020 United States census, there were 906 people, 355 households, and 342 families residing in the city.

== Public Safety ==
Police protection is provided by District 18 of the Palm Beach County Sheriff's Office. The city is staffed with 5 Road Patrol Deputies. In addition, the district receives support from the Traffic Division, K-9, Aviation, and Community Policing. District 18 headquarters is located in the county administrative building in Royal Palm Beach.

Fire and EMS service is provided by Station 22 of Palm Beach County Fire Rescue. The station contains 4 bays housing an advanced life support Engine, Rescue Ambulance, a 3,000 gallon Water Tender, a Brush Truck, and a High-Water Vehicle. It is home to six uniformed personnel 24 hours a day, 7 days a week.
