= Hurricane Milton tornado outbreak =

2024 tropical cyclone tornado outbreak

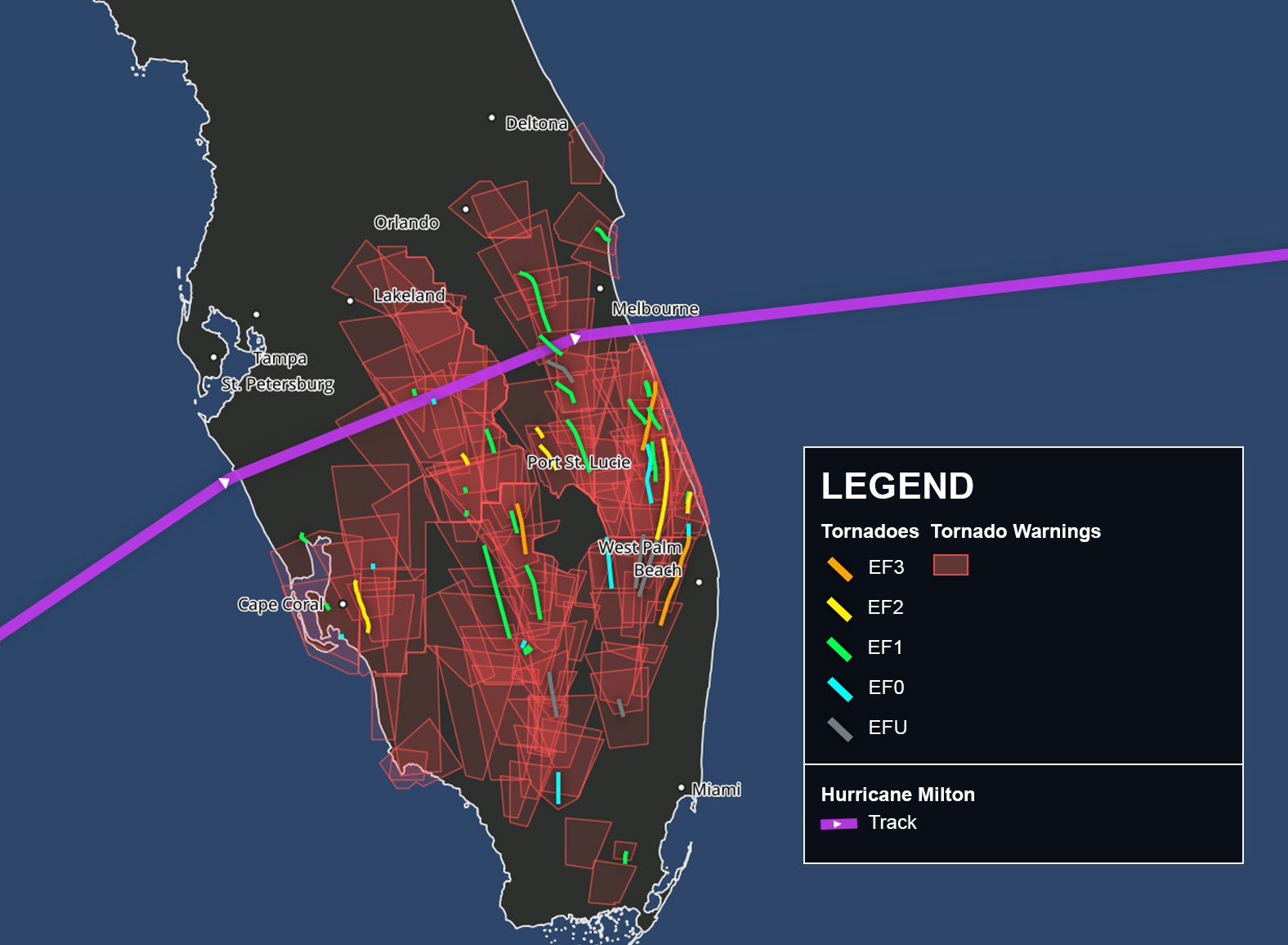
- Map of tornadoes and tornado warnings associated with Milton in Florida.

Meteorological history
- Duration: October 8–9, 2024

Tornado outbreak
- Tornadoes: 45
- Max. rating: EF3 tornado
- Duration: 1 day, 19 hours, 32 minutes
- Highest winds: 160 mph (260 km/h); EF3 tornado in Fort Pierce, Florida.

Overall effects
- Fatalities: 6
- Injuries: >30
- Damage: $681.8 million (2024 USD)
- Areas affected: South Florida, Central Florida, Treasure Coast
- Part of the tornado outbreaks of 2024 and Hurricane Milton
- Effects: Tornado outbreak; Aftermath: Misinformation; Other wikis: Commons: Milton images

Hurricane Milton's outer bands generated a historic and destructive tornado outbreak as the tropical cyclone neared and tracked across the Florida peninsula on October 8–9, 2024. 45 confirmed tornadoes touched down in the state, with at least three reaching EF3 intensity on the Enhanced Fujita Scale. This was the fourth such hurricane or its remnants to produce an intense (EF3+) tornado in the United States during the 2024 Atlantic hurricane season, after Beryl, Debby and Helene. Milton, the second Category 5 hurricane of the season, ultimately weakened to Category 3 strength before making landfall in Florida. Six people were confirmed to have died as a result of the tornado outbreak, with an estimated 30 being injured, mostly coming from two EF3 tornadoes: The Lakewood Park-Vero Beach tornado, and the Wellington tornado.

A total of 45 confirmed tornadoes touched down in Florida ahead of the storm between October 8–9, focused on the Florida Heartland, the Treasure Coast and the Space Coast. This became the largest single day of tornadoes in state history, surpassing Hurricane Irma. At 6 pm, the National Weather Service office in Miami, which covers much of South Florida except the Florida Keys of Monroe County, reported that they had issued 55 tornado warnings, a record high in one day beating out the previous record of 37 on September 27, 2022, during Hurricane Ian, and confirmed nine tornadoes on a preliminary basis. The NWS in Tampa Bay also set a record high of 29 tornado warnings in one day, beating the previous record of 23 held by both Tropical Storm Debby of 2012 and Tropical Storm Andrea on June 6, 2013. In total, a record 126 tornado warnings have been issued throughout the state, the second-most of any state in one day, only behind Alabama on April 27, 2011, at the height of the 2011 Super Outbreak. Milton was also the first tropical cyclone to generate an intense (EF3 or stronger) tornado in Florida since Agnes in 1972 and the third on record since 1950, the first occurring in 1959. Milton also yielded Florida's fifth deadliest outbreak in 70 years, behind the 1998 Kissimmee tornado outbreak, which killed 42; the 2007 Groundhog Day tornado outbreak, which killed 21; the March 31, 1962, outbreak, which killed 17; and the Hurricane Agnes outbreak, which killed seven.

== Meteorological synopsis ==
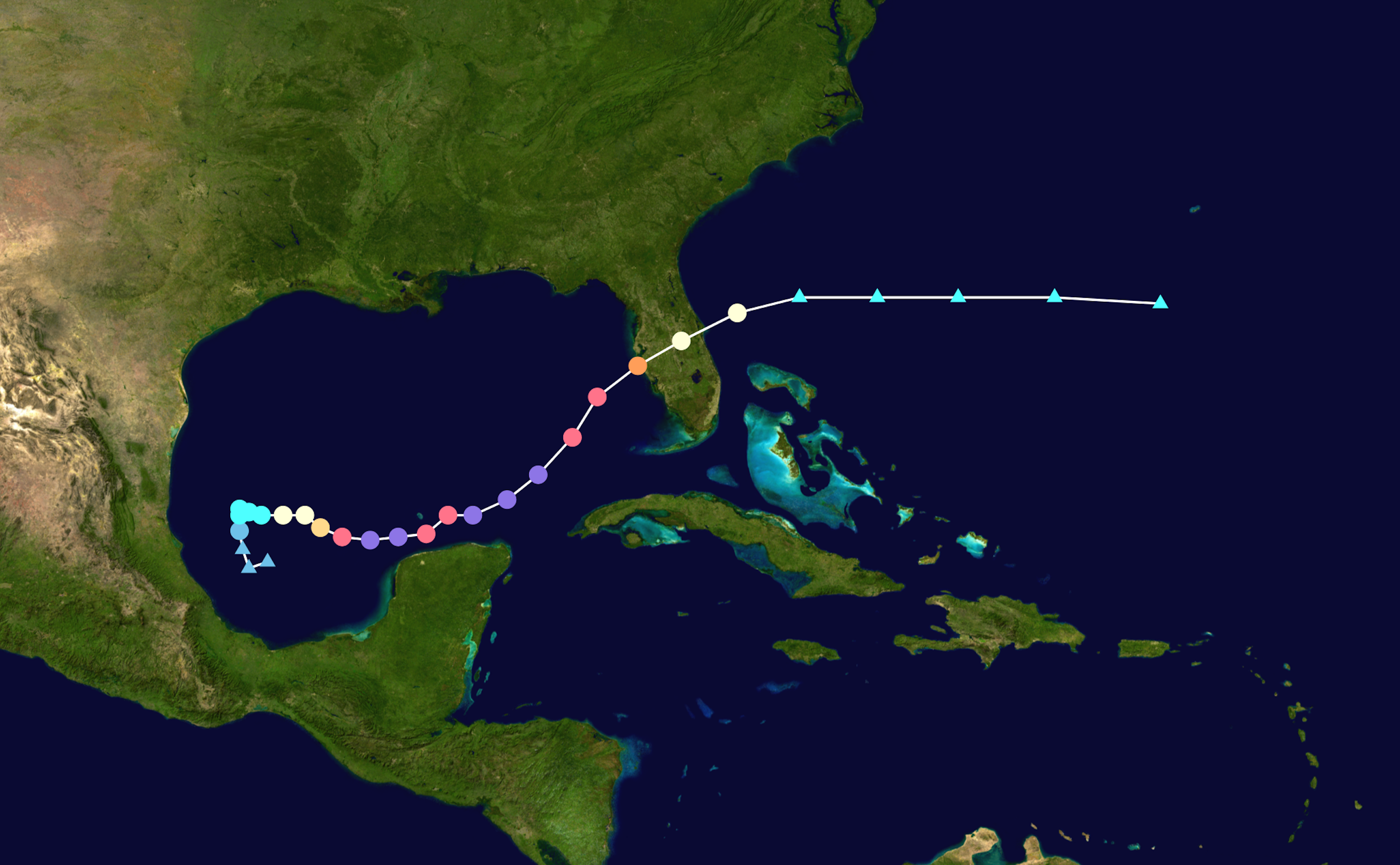
Track of Hurricane Milton.

=== Background ===
On October 5, a tropical depression developed in the western Gulf of Mexico, strengthening into Tropical Storm Milton shortly thereafter. The storm proceeded to explosively intensify near the Yucatán Peninsula, becoming the 5th-most intense Atlantic hurricane on record on October 7. That same day, as Hurricane Milton approached Florida, the United States's Storm Prediction Center (SPC) outlined a slight risk convective outlook for much of southern Florida, observing that enhanced low to mid-level flow, dew points in the mid 70s (about 24 °C), and favorable timing with peak daytime heating would lead to a conducive environment for tornadogenesis as Milton's outer convective bands swept the area. On October 9 at 06:00 UTC, the SPC issued an enhanced risk of severe weather in central and southern Florida as the hurricane approached, with a 10% hatched tornado outlook due to intense convection, MLCAPE at 1500 to 2000 J/kg, and storm relative helicity values soaring above 350 m^{2}/s^{2} being forecasted, favoring the development of supercells. Rainbands stretching far from the center allowed the tornado outbreak to stretch further south.

=== Overview ===
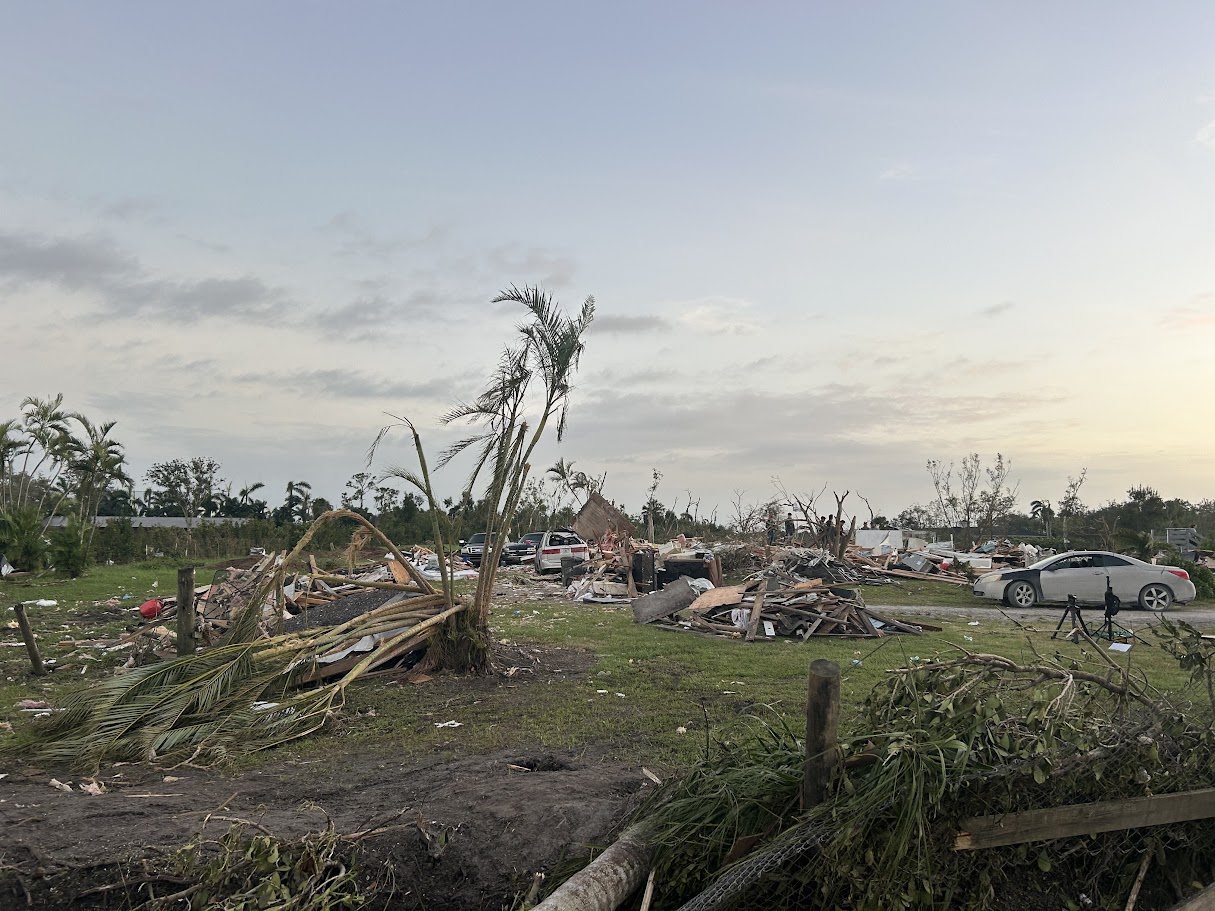
EF3 tornado damage in a Wellington neighborhood.

The outbreak first started late on October 8 with an EF1 tornado striking the west side of Key West. The next day, 45 tornadoes touched down during the morning and afternoon as lines and clusters of supercells impacted South and Central. Two EFU tornadoes moved across I-75 in the Everglades with no serious damage noted. Later, an EF1 tornado caused damage in the Sky Valley neighborhood of Clewiston. A high-end EF2 tornado impacted the western part of Fort Myers before crossing the Caloosahatchee River and striking North Fort Myers, causing extensive damage to homes and knocking down numerous trees in the area. An EF3 tornado, the strongest recorded tornado in southwest Florida's history, struck a neighborhood in the area of Lakeport in Glades County, destroying 39 homes, before weakening and causing minor damage in Brighton Reservation. A solar farm in Lake Placid was struck by a tornado, decreasing electricity production.

Clusters of supercells then passed west of the Miami metropolitan area and struck the Treasure Coast, producing several tornadoes. Another EF3 tornado struck a mobile home in Wellington before weakening and traveling northward where it then restrengthened to EF3 intensity and damaged a shopping and residential area in western Palm Beach Gardens before weakening again and eventually dissipating in the area of Jupiter Farms. The most devastating tornado was another low-end EF3 tornado that heavily damaged or destroyed multiple mobile home parks near Fort Pierce. The most severe damage was in the Spanish Lakes community, where over 20 mobile homes were destroyed or flipped, killing six people. The tornado then impacted Vero Beach, where more homes and businesses were damaged before the tornado moved offshore. During the tornado, many lives were reportedly saved on Winter Garden Parkway, as a woman began honking her horn to alert others of the tornadoes. In addition to the fatalities, over 25 people required rescue during the tornado. Overall damage from the tornado was estimated at $514 million. A total of nine tornadoes struck the county, including three in the span of 25 minutes. In all, at least nine tornadoes impacted the Treasure Coast. The final tornado was an EF1 tornado in Cocoa Beach that ripped off the roof of a Wells Fargo bank.

== Confirmed tornadoes ==
Confirmed tornadoes by Enhanced Fujita rating
EFU	EF0	EF1	EF2	EF3	EF4	EF5	Total
4	7	25	6	3	0	0	45

=== October 8 event ===
List of confirmed tornadoes – Tuesday, October 8, 2024 (Note: All dates are based on the local time zone where the tornado touched down; however, all times are in Coordinated Universal Time for consistency.)
EF#	Location	County / Parish	State	Start Coord.	Time (UTC)	Path length	Max width
EF1	Key West	Monroe	FL	24.544°N 81.804°W	03:37–03:39	0.28 mi (0.45 km)	60 yd (55 m)
EF1	A waterspout moved ashore in the Truman Annex neighborhood of Key West. Numerous large tree limbs and a few small trees were snapped along with removed flashing and shingles from the corners of a small apartment complex. A light pole snapped just above its base as well. A dumpster was lofted and tossed into a window at the apartment facility, shattering it. More trees continued to be snapped until the tornado lifted.						

=== October 9 event ===
List of confirmed tornadoes – Wednesday, October 9, 2024
EF#	Location	County / Parish	State	Start Coord.	Time (UTC)	Path length	Max width
EF1	W of Florida City	Miami-Dade	FL	25.4329°N 80.5207°W	08:27–08:40	2.93 mi (4.72 km)	75 yd (69 m)
EF1	Damage from this tornado was limited mainly fences and yards. Several trees were downed.						
EF0	S of Miccosukee Reservation	Miami-Dade	FL	25.7157°N 80.8679°W	12:45–12:49	9.04 mi (14.55 km)	50 yd (46 m)
EF0	A tornadic debris signature was noted on radar and damage was found.						
EFU	W of Miccosukee Reservation to Big Cypress Reservation	Collier, Hendry	FL	26.1261°N 80.8774°W	13:42–14:06	13.52 mi (21.76 km)	50 yd (46 m)
EFU	F-DOT cameras and numerous videos from the public showed a tornado crossing I-75. No damage was found.						
EFU	W of Weston	Broward	FL	26.1268°N 80.5309°W	14:04–14:15	4.69 mi (7.55 km)	50 yd (46 m)
EFU	A storm chaser recorded a tornado over open land. No damage was found.						
EF1	SE of Montura to western Clewiston to SE of Moore Haven	Hendry, Glades	FL	26.5841°N 80.9634°W	14:42–15:20	16.97 mi (27.31 km)	150 yd (140 m)
EF1	A tornado touched down in eastern Hendry County and moved northward, passing through the western portion of Clewiston. Trees were damaged and power lines were downed as the tornado crossed US 27 near the Sky Valley neighborhood. It continued into Glades County, where it moved through sugarcane fields, causing additional tree and crop damage before dissipating.						
EF1	S of Montura to SE of Palmdale	Hendry, Glades	FL	26.4952°N 81.1237°W	15:27–16:11	29.89 mi (48.10 km)	50 yd (46 m)
EF1	Scattered damage occurred to utility poles along a long track. A tornado debris signature was also noted on radar.						
EF0	NE of Belle Glade to SSE of Port Mayaca	Palm Beach	FL	26.7286°N 80.5906°W	15:40–16:08	15.53 mi (24.99 km)	50 yd (46 m)
EF0	Minor tree damage occurred.						
EF1	E of Lakeport to Brighton Reservation	Glades	FL	26.9874°N 81.0846°W	15:44–15:59	6.28 mi (10.11 km)	120 yd (110 m)
EF1	This high-end EF1 tornado began on western Lake Okeechobee before moving ashore, damaging several manufactured homes and vegetation in the area. The tornado tracked northward, rolling an outbuilding off its foundation, snapping a wooden utility pole at its base and damaging several more mobile homes. The tornado continued through fields before entering the Brighton Reservation, crossing through several cattle pastures. Several trees were uprooted or lost their tops in the reservation before the tornado lifted.						
EF0	Punta Rassa	Lee	FL	26.493°N 81.9965°W	15:45–15:47	0.24 mi (0.39 km)	33 yd (30 m)
EF0	A brief tornado occurred in the Jonathan Harbour community, damaging one home, destroying a houseboat and lifting a second pontoon boat onto a dock. The tornado continued into Punta Rassa Cove before dissipating.						
EF1	Matlacha	Lee	FL	26.6281°N 82.0679°W	15:54–15:56	0.91 mi (1.46 km)	100 yd (91 m)
EF1	A waterspout moved onshore in Matlacha causing roof and siding damage to several homes. The worst of the damage was to two homes, one where half of the roof was ripped off and the other was a mobile home that had half the roof ripped off and walls collapse under it. The tornado moved back over water and dissipated.						
EF2	Villas to western Fort Myers to northeastern Cape Coral	Lee	FL	26.5215°N 81.8602°W	16:09–16:41	16.56 mi (26.65 km)	500 yd (460 m)
EF2	This strong, high-end EF2 tornado first caused minor roof damage in Villas before quickly moving into Fort Myers. The tornado then caused scattered tree damage and minor roof damage across the west side of Fort Myers, including removing a large portion of the roof of a home and collapsed a wall on the home's garage. Roof damage was also noted just across the street but was already being repaired at the time of the survey. The track continued across the Fort Myers Country Club with snapped and uprooted trees along with minor to moderate damage to homes. The tornado then crossed the Caloosahatchee River and entered North Fort Myers, producing scattered tree damage before damaging several structures in a manufactured home community. Continuing northward, the tornado intensified as it struck a warehouse. The tornado continued on a north-northwest track, passing through several more neighborhoods in northeastern Cape Coral, producing tree and roof damage. The tornado passed through another manufactured home community, significantly damaging several structures before lifting.						
EF1	SE of Lorida	Highlands	FL	27.362°N 81.205°W	16:37–16:50	6.83 mi (10.99 km)	500 yd (460 m)
EF1	A weak tornado began just to the east of Lake Istokpoga and was recorded and photographed by storm chasers and the public. The tornado moved over mostly rural countryside before damage to several power poles and snapped pine trees was observed. The tornado then peeled large metal roof panels off an outbuilding and buckled its doors, dissipating soon after inflicting the damage.						
EF1	El Jobean	Charlotte	FL	26.9943°N 82.1875°W	16:41–16:43	2.58 mi (4.15 km)	450 yd (410 m)
EF1	This brief tornado originally began as a waterspout on the Myakka River before producing considerable damage in a small community along the river. After moving through, the tornado quickly dissipated.						
EF0	N of North Fort Myers	Charlotte	FL	26.8199°N 81.8348°W	16:54–16:56	0.51 mi (0.82 km)	25 yd (23 m)
EF0	Several trees were uprooted, a camper was overturned and a structure was damage.						
EF2	NW of Okeechobee to E of Fort Basinger	Okeechobee	FL	27.2822°N 80.8798°W	18:04–18:20	8.5 mi (13.7 km)	250 yd (230 m)
EF2	This tornado first lifted a manufactured home off its foundation and threw it over 200 yd (180 m), completely destroying it and injuring two occupants. A nearby steel barn had its metal torn off and the structure twisted. Further along the path, agricultural equipment was overturned and a home experienced partial roof loss, with its roof shifted north and a palm tree snapped in half. Another mobile home was destroyed nearby and a small farm outbuilding collapsed. The tornado then tracked through the Dixie Ranch Acres community, damaging multiple homes on several blocks. The damage mainly consisted of roof and soffit damage along with destroyed outbuildings. One home lost over a fifth of its roofing and significant tree damage was observed nearby. The tornado then moved into open pasture before dissipating.						
EF0	W of Palm City to Port St. Lucie	Martin, St. Lucie	FL	27.127°N 80.384°W	18:05–18:40	17.94 mi (28.87 km)	200 yd (180 m)
EF0	A high-end EF0 tornado touched down in a wooded area south of I-95 and crossed it, flipping a tractor trailer on the interstate. It continued north along the interstate, downing numerous trees. Moving north-northeast, the tornado entered the Rosser Reserve subdivision, causing minor to moderate damage to residential structures. Shingles, soffits, and gutters were the main parts of homes that were damaged here. In the Hidden Oaks neighborhood, a home sustained major damage when part of its roof was peeled back. The tornado weakened as it traveled further north, downing only a few trees and several large branches. A few homes in the Torino neighborhood experienced minor roof and siding damage before the tornado lifted.						
EF1	ENE of Cypress Quarters to S of Fort Drum	Okeechobee	FL	27.2724°N 80.7072°W	18:10–18:39	17.14 mi (27.58 km)	300 yd (270 m)
EF1	This high-end EF1 tornado initially flipped over some irrigation equipment before damaging a home's metal roof, without tearing it off, and toppled nearby trees, including around the entrance to Sunshine Grove, the site of the Okeechobee Music & Arts Festival. It then traveled over mainly undeveloped land with no known damage occurring. The tornado then passed over a commercial farm causing significant roof damage to two small homes and flipped a semi-truck with a flatbed trailer. The most severe damage occurred at the Pine Creek Sporting Club where three well-constructed wood-frame outbuildings were destroyed. Heavy-duty posts on two buildings were sheared off and on the third, posts were ripped from the ground as the roof was lifted, scattering debris northward. An employee reported that a UTV was thrown into an oak tree while nearby cabins sustained only minor damage. The tornado continued northwest, snapping numerous trees before eventually lifting just south of Fort Drum.						
EF2	Sylvan Shores	Highlands	FL	27.3052°N 81.342°W	18:13–18:18	2.87 mi (4.62 km)	300 yd (270 m)
EF2	A high-end EF2 tornado began on the southeastern shore of Lake Clay before moving across the lake and entering a mobile home community on the lake's north side. Approximately 20-30 mobile homes suffered damage, primarily consisting of carports being peeled off or removed along with various degrees of roof and patio damage. A few mobile homes suffered partial wall collapses as a result of their roof being compromised, with one injury occurring in one of those homes. One mobile home was displaced a foot from its supports along with its roof mostly removed and a few walls collapsed. A large number of tree limbs were downed in the park as well. The tornado continued over rural land before dissipating at southern shore of Lake Apthorpe.						
EF0	NW of Big Cypress Reservation (1st tornado)	Hendry	FL	26.4502°N 81.0533°W	18:15–18:17	1.28 mi (2.06 km)	50 yd (46 m)
EF0	Minor tree damage occurred.						
EF1	N of Big Cypress Reservation (2nd tornado)	Hendry	FL	26.4311°N 81.0388°W	18:19–18:21	1.26 mi (2.03 km)	50 yd (46 m)
EF1	A large utility pole was damaged.						
EF1	N of Big Cypress Reservation (3rd tornado)	Hendry	FL	26.419°N 81.0366°W	18:21–18:23	1.74 mi (2.80 km)	50 yd (46 m)
EF1	A high-end EF1 tornado damaged a few trees.						
EF3	NE of Moore Haven to Brighton Reservation	Glades	FL	26.8878°N 81.0381°W	18:24–18:42	15.46 mi (24.88 km)	250 yd (230 m)
EF3	An intense tornado first caused damage in the Sarasota Colony neighborhood in Lakeport, demolishing the second stories of three well-built homes. The tornado then broke the windows of homes, tossed manufactured homes and trailers, flipped a car, and scattered debris in the Fishermans Lane neighborhood. One of the manufactured home's chassis was wrapped around 10 ft (3.0 m) to 15 ft (4.6 m) high around a tree, with its contents found 200 yd (180 m) away in a pond. Three people were injured in this neighborhood. The tornado continued north-northwest, entering the Brighton Seminole Indian Reservation, damaging trees and pulling metal roofing from outbuildings. In the reservation's main village, roof damage occurred to chickee huts and trees. A spectator area and a dugout were also heavily damaged at the village's sport complex, where the tornado ended up lifting behind the baseball fields.						
EF2	NE of Fort Basinger	Okeechobee	FL	27.4318°N 80.9535°W	18:27–18:32	2.64 mi (4.25 km)	100 yd (91 m)
EF2	A tornado began over open pasture before moving through a dairy farm, partially collapsing a large steel barn. Nearby power poles and lines were downed, including a power pole that was snapped. The tornado then moved back over open pasture before dissipating.						
EF1	Venus	Highlands	FL	27.0669°N 81.3478°W	18:30–18:32	0.59 mi (0.95 km)	100 yd (91 m)
EF1	This tornado first damaged several trees, snapping large branches off of them and damaged the garage and roof of a nearby home. The tornado continued tracking north damaging another home and shed and snapping several pine trees while uprooting a few palm trees. A small storage structure was destroyed and multiple long trailers, a pickup truck, and a horse trailer were all overturned at one home. Another residence saw a speedboat tossed into the house after being blown off its trailer. An RV was moved approximately 100 yd (91 m) from a carport at another home, with an ATV at the location also flipped. Damage continued mainly to trees before lifting.						
EF1	S of Placid Lakes	Highlands	FL	27.177°N 81.3519°W	18:42–18:44	0.47 mi (0.76 km)	
EF1	This brief tornado tore half the roof off of the Archbold Biological Station, with some minor damage to the roof of a nearby building before quickly lifting.						
EF0	Western Avon Park	Highlands	FL	27.588°N 81.5156°W	18:47–18:48	0.57 mi (0.92 km)	75 yd (69 m)
EF0	A high-end EF0 tornado damaged the roof of an inn, damaged the awnings of two single-wide trailers, and snapped several large tree limbs along its brief path.						
EF1	N of Fort Drum to ESE of Yeehaw Junction	Okeechobee, Indian River	FL	27.594°N 80.789°W	18:47–19:01	7.76 mi (12.49 km)	100 yd (91 m)
EF1	This tornado struck two solar farms, heavily damaging solar panels at both complexes.						
EF1	S of Bareah	Hardee	FL	27.6276°N 81.617°W	18:49–18:52	0.98 mi (1.58 km)	40 yd (37 m)
EF1	A few trees were snapped.						
EFU	W of Loxahatchee Groves to SE of Indiantown	Palm Beach, Martin	FL	26.7294°N 80.4646°W	18:49–19:11	16.35 mi (26.31 km)	50 yd (46 m)
EFU	A storm chaser witnessed a tornado just north of US 98.						
EFU	NE of Yeehaw Junction	Indian River, Osceola	FL	27.689°N 80.796°W	18:58–19:18	9.6 mi (15.4 km)	50 yd (46 m)
EFU	A tornado debris signature was noted on radar in rural, swampy areas across Indian River and Osceola counties. This tornado was also photographed by a local storm chaser.						
EF1	Port St. Lucie to S of Fort Pierce South	St. Lucie	FL	27.228°N 80.361°W	18:59–19:13	11.8 mi (19.0 km)	150 yd (140 m)
EF1	The tornado initially caused minor residential damage, such as missing shingles and soffit issues, in three subdivisions in Port St. Lucie. It continued northward, producing sporadic tree damage and impacting communities on the northside of Port St. Lucie. The tornado then produced significant structural damage to a metal canopy system at the St. Lucie County Sherriff's Office before lifting shortly after.						
EF1	SW of Lakewood Park to W of Florida Ridge	St. Lucie, Indian River	FL	27.4955°N 80.4156°W	19:05–19:19	11.42 mi (18.38 km)	100 yd (91 m)
EF1	A tornado began near the Meadowood Golf and Tennis Club, downing oak, pine and palm trees. The tornado continued northwestward, uprooting and snapping several pines at low-end EF1 strength. The tornado continued tracking northwestward along I-95, producing minor damage to carports and roofs of a few mobile homes before dissipating after crossing county lines into Indian River County.						
EF1	N of Yeehaw Junction to NE of Kenansville	Indian River, Brevard, Osceola	FL	27.815°N 80.857°W	19:14–19:30	8.2 mi (13.2 km)	150 yd (140 m)
EF1	This tornado began just south of the triple point between the three counties, crossing through all of them before continuing through Osceola County. A notable swath of tree damage occurred, with a large number of pine trees snapped in a heavily wooded area. Minor damage also was inflicted to a barn.						
EF1	NE of Kenansville to N of Holopaw	Osceola	FL	27.9235°N 80.9162°W	19:28–20:07	21 mi (34 km)	150 yd (140 m)
EF1	This rain-wrapped tornado caused a well-constructed barn to collapse and snapped or uprooted numerous trees across rural portions of the county.						
EF1	Vero Beach South to Vero Beach to Gifford	Indian River	FL	27.6178°N 80.3883°W	19:48–19:57	4.51 mi (7.26 km)	150 yd (140 m)
EF1	A tornado initially downed trees before damaging residences and businesses, mainly their roofs. The tornado then struck the Vero Beach Police Department, where surveillance cameras showed several trees and utility poles downed. A mesonet weather station at the station recorded a peak wind gust of 92 mph (148 km/h). Several more trees continued to be downed by the tornado as it tracked northward through neighborhoods, before diminishing in Gifford.						
EF1	Port Salerno	Martin	FL	27.1244°N 80.1938°W	20:03–20:12	3 mi (4.8 km)	250 yd (230 m)
EF1	A tornado touched down and quickly tossed a camper, injuring an occupant. The tornado then moved into the Colonial Heights subdivision, significantly damaging several mobile homes with the main damage being to their carports and roofs, while some of the mobile homes were shifted off their foundations. The tornado entered the New Monrovia neighborhood causing moderate to major damage to many homes, including complete roof loss on several manufactured homes and damaging the roof and vegetation at Murray Middle School. Further north, in the Rocky Point subdivision along the St. Lucie River, numerous houses suffered minor to moderate roof, soffit, and carport damage, with one home experiencing total roof loss. The tornado then moved over the St. Lucie River, becoming a waterspout and dissipated over the river.						
EF1	Vero Beach South to Vero Beach to Gifford	Indian River	FL	27.6233°N 80.3957°W	20:09–20:16	3.44 mi (5.54 km)	100 yd (91 m)
EF1	A second tornado struck the Vero Beach area, starting just west of the previous tornado's track. Damage was limited to trees initially before inflicting more significant damage to structures near the Vero Beach Airport. Several businesses suffered extensive roof loss and numerous trees were uprooted. A large metal warehouse shifted off its foundation as its walls and roof collapsed. The tornado tracked through the airport before lifting just after exiting it.						
EF1	Fort Pierce North to Lakewood Park	St. Lucie	FL	27.4695°N 80.3468°W	20:14–20:24	6.75 mi (10.86 km)	150 yd (140 m)
EF1	This tornado began just north of the Belcher Canal, causing vegetative damage and partial roof loss to a few structures in Fort Pierce North. It then moved nearby the Treasure Coast International Airport airfield, where several small planes were tossed and flipped. The airport's ASOS recorded a wind gust of 60 mph (97 km/h). The tornado then tracked through forested area north of the airport, damaging trees. Substantial damage was observed to a few homes within the Island Pines Golf Club area. Continuing northwest, the tornado entered Lakewood Park, causing damage to mainly carports, porches and awnings. The tornado struck Lakewood Park roughly an hour before the EF3 tornado at 2059 UTC. The tornado lifted just before entering Indian River County.						
EF2	W of Loxahatchee Groves to western Palm City to southern Fort Pierce	Palm Beach, Martin, St. Lucie	FL	26.6907°N 80.4445°W	20:33–21:50	64.59 mi (103.95 km)	300 yd (270 m)
EF2	A strong, long-track tornado began in rural Palm Beach County, moving over open, uninhabited land, including the J.W. Corbett Wildlife Management Area. The tornado then moved through rural Martin County, before impacting a few homes. A large, newly constructed home experienced major damage when nearly all of its roof was torn back and tossed onto an adjacent home. Nearby metal storage structures were also significantly damaged. The tornado continued northward, sporadically damaging vegetation and residential structures occurred. The tornado then damaged several industrial buildings, including the canopy of a gas station. Crossing Florida's Turnpike, it entered several subdivisions but only produced minor damage given that the homes were built strongly. Storm spotter video showed the tornado crossing the St. Lucie River becoming a well-defined waterspout before moving back ashore at the St. Lucia River Club, inflicting minor property damage and significant damage to vegetation. Sporadic property damage continued in eastern Port St. Lucie, mainly in the form of shingle loss and soffit damage. The tornado then entered Savannas Preserve State Park, causing more damage to vegetation before striking Indian River Estates where numerous homes were affected. Several parked vehicles were flipped and tossed, and a few homes experienced partial roof loss. The tornado continued into southern Fort Pierce, but dissipated quickly upon entering residential areas.						
EF3	SW of Wellington to The Acreage SW of Hobe Sound	Palm Beach, Martin	FL	26.5555°N 80.3321°W	20:43–21:30	32.89 mi (52.93 km)	457 yd (418 m)
EF3	See section on this tornado – 7 people were injured						
EF3	N of Port St. Lucie to Lakewood Park to Vero Beach	St. Lucie, Indian River	FL	27.3742°N 80.4266°W	20:59–21:30	21.24 mi (34.18 km)	500 yd (460 m)
EF3	6 deaths – See section on this tornado						
EF2	Eastern Port Salerno	Martin	FL	27.0803°N 80.1932°W	17:35–17:46	5.71 mi (9.19 km)	400 yd (370 m)
EF2	A tornado began in the Atlantic Ridge Preserve State Park and tracked over marshland before impacting the Lost Lake subdivision, causing significant tile loss on concrete block homes and extensive vegetative damage. It continued into the Mariner Sands community, causing several wood-framed homes to lose roofs and partially collapsing their walls at low-end EF2 strength. One resident sustained minor injuries. The tornado then impacted the Manatee Creek subdivision, where about 30 wood-framed homes suffered major damage, including roof loss and wall collapse. The tornado then moved into Rocky Point, where the eastern side of the neighborhood experienced sporadic damage to roofs, soffits and downed trees and power lines. The tornado then moved out over onto the Intracoastal Waterway before dissipating as a waterspout.						
EF1	Cocoa Beach to Merritt Island	Brevard	FL	28.3395°N 80.6059°W	21:53–22:09	5.24 mi (8.43 km)	250 yd (230 m)
EF1	This waterspout moved onshore into Cocoa Beach near a condominium, damaging the roofs of several storage units and garages on the property. The tornado continued west-northwest, removing a large portion of the roof of a bank. Moving into residential area, the tornado caused roof loss, broken windows, and downed trees within the area. The tornado then moved offshore onto the Banana River before landfalling onto Merritt Island in the Riviera Isles subdivision, inflicting minor damage to pool and porch enclosures before dissipating quickly.						

=== Wellington–Palm Beach Gardens–Jupiter Farms, Florida ===
Wellington–Palm Beach Gardens–Jupiter Farms, Florida
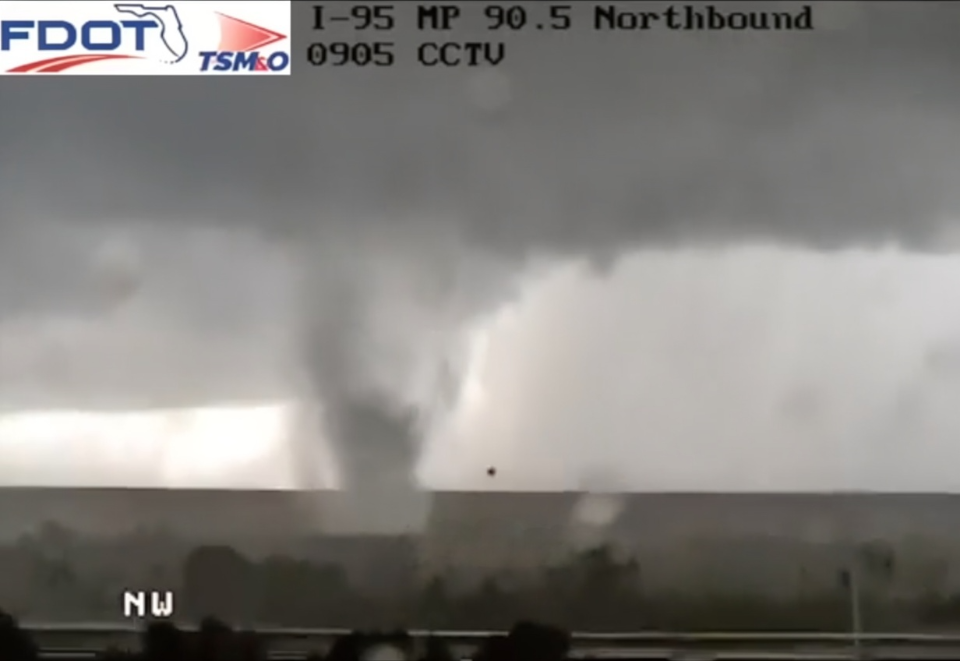
- The tornado, as seen west of Jupiter Farms, Florida

Meteorological history
- Formed: October 9, 2024, 4:43 p.m. EDT (UTC−05:00)
- Dissipated: October 9, 2024, 5:30 p.m. EDT (UTC−05:00)
- Duration: 47 minutes

EF3 tornado
- on the Enhanced Fujita scale
- Highest winds: 140 mph (230 km/h)

Overall effects
- Fatalities: 0
- Injuries: 7
- Damage: $81.45 million (2024 USD)

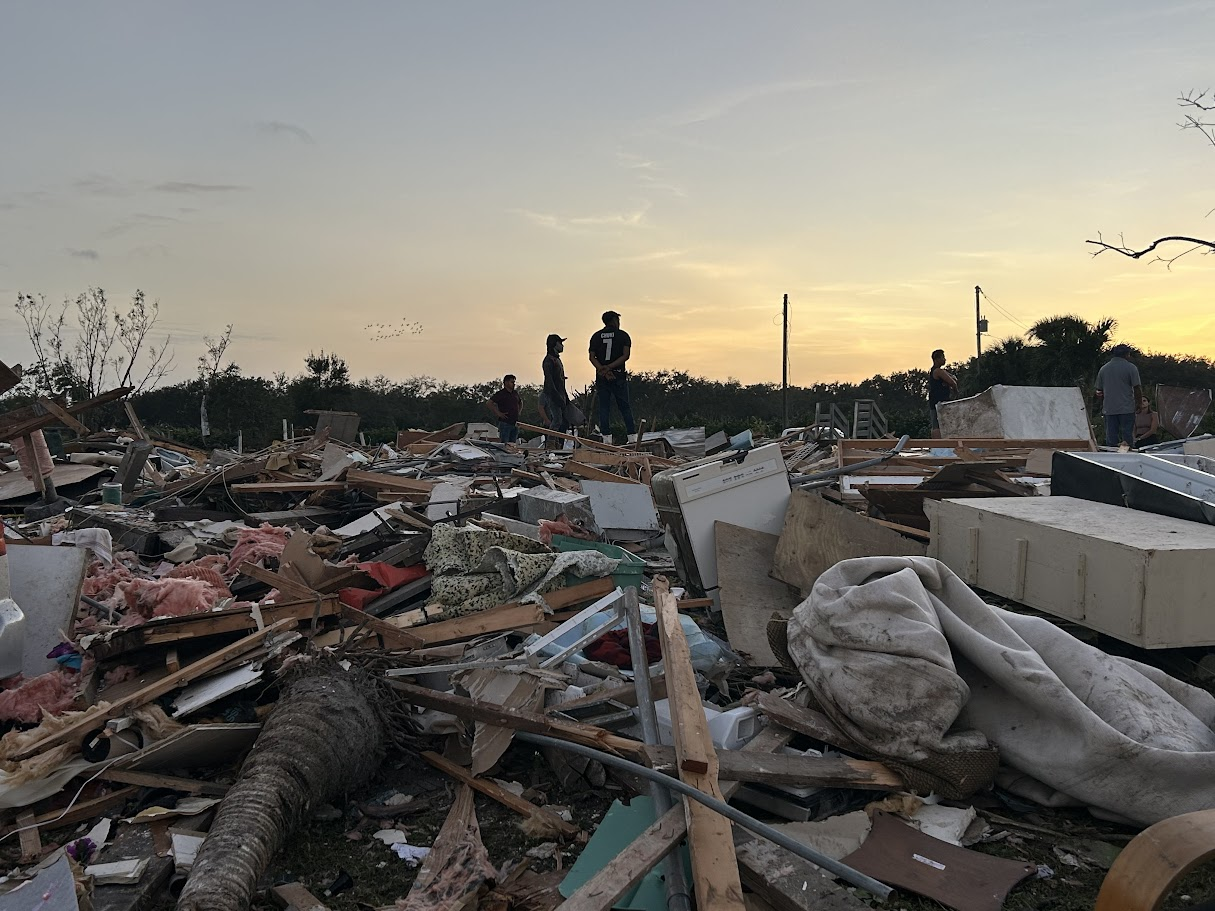
EF3 damage to a large mobile home, where seven people were injured,

This intense, long-tracked, and destructive tornado first touched down in the Loxahatchee National Wildlife Refuge, before tracking northeastward into southern portions of Wellington. The tornado impacted the neighborhood along Deer Path Lane, where a double-wide mobile home was completely demolished at low-end EF3 strength, with seven people inside the structure being injured. Trees and a power pole along the road were also damaged. The tornado then tracked over Hollow Tree Road and Rustic Road, inflicting EF2 damage to several homes, trees, and outbuildings. The tornado continued northeastward, tracking into western portions of Wellington and impacting the Lakefield West neighborhood, with homes along Corsica Drive suffering EF1 damage. The tornado continued northeastward through the communities of Meadow Woods, The Preserve, and Bink's Estates, inflicting EF1–EF2 damage to residences and trees. The tornado then crossed the US 98/SR 80 into Loxahatchee Groves, uprooting trees at EF1 intensity.

The tornado damaged several outbuildings as it tracked across Okeechobee Road, continuing to damage trees as it tracked northeastward towards The Acreage. The tornado tracked across western portions of the Royal Palm Beach Pines Natural Area before inflicting EF1–EF2 damage as it tracked through neighborhoods within The Acreage. A home along 85th Road North suffered EF2 damage with portions of the roof being torn away, and numerous trees were snapped at EF2 intensity. The tornado intensified as it exited The Acreage and crossed CR 809A, entering the Avenir community of Palm Beach Gardens and directly striking a recently constructed Publix at low-end EF3 intensity, collapsing portions of the roof. Palm trees outside along the front and sides of the supermarket were severely damaged. The tornado then tracked just east of Nautilus Circuit, inflicting significant damage to several homes. The tornado once again crossed Northlake Boulevard, causing EF2 damage to a residence and trees. The tornado tracked along Driftwood Way and Arbordale Way, damaging several homes and buildings at EF3 intensity, inflicting heavy damage to roofs and durable windows, along with lifting and displacing vehicles around 100 yards (91 m) from their origin point. The tornado tracked just west of the North Palm Beach County General Aviation Airport, narrowly missing it. The tornado then crossed SR 710, inflicting EF1 damage to trees before tracking into Jupiter Farms. The tornado inflicted EF1–EF2 damage to trees, outbuildings, and power poles as it continued tracking northward. The tornado inflicted significant damage to Blue Ridge Farms, with four buildings, horse trailers, and almost all the fencing on the property being destroyed.

The tornado exited Jupiter Farms as it crossed into Martin County and then crossed Florida's Turnpike, tipping over a semi-truck and damaging trees at EF0 intensity while tracking over I-95 before dissipating after entering Jonathan Dickinson State Park. The tornado reached a maximum width of 457 yards (418 m), tracked 32.89 miles (52.93 km), and inflicted $81.35 million (2024 USD) in damages.

=== Port St. Lucie–Fort Pierce–Vero Beach, Florida ===
Port St. Lucie–Fort Pierce–Vero Beach, Florida
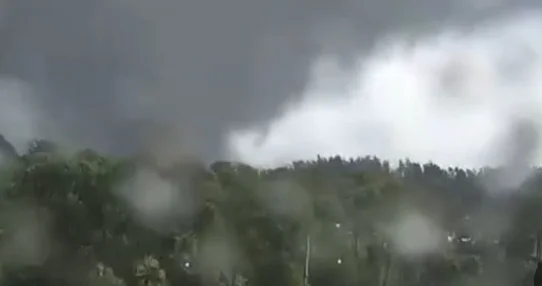
- CCTV image of the intense tornado near Fort Pierce, Florida

Meteorological history
- Formed: October 9, 2024, 4:59 p.m. EDT (UTC−05:00)
- Dissipated: October 9, 2024, 5:30 p.m. EDT (UTC−05:00)
- Duration: 31 minutes

EF3 tornado
- on the Enhanced Fujita scale
- Highest winds: 160 mph (260 km/h)

Overall effects
- Fatalities: 6
- Damage: $514 million (2024 USD)

This deadly high-end EF3 tornado first inflicted damage at the Creekside subdivision and Sunnier Palms Park, where homes lost roofs and mobile homes were severely damaged or destroyed. Moving northward, the tornado reached its peak intensity as it partially collapsed two large warehouses. The tornado then tracked through more subdivisions and small communities, inflicting significant damage to structures. Damage included homes suffering roof, siding, and soffit damage. The tornado devastated the Spanish Lakes community where over 20 mobile homes were destroyed or flipped by the tornado, although most concrete structures survived. All of the fatalities from the tornado occurred in this location. Concrete structures within the Spanish Lakes community only sustained moderate damage compared to the mobile homes.

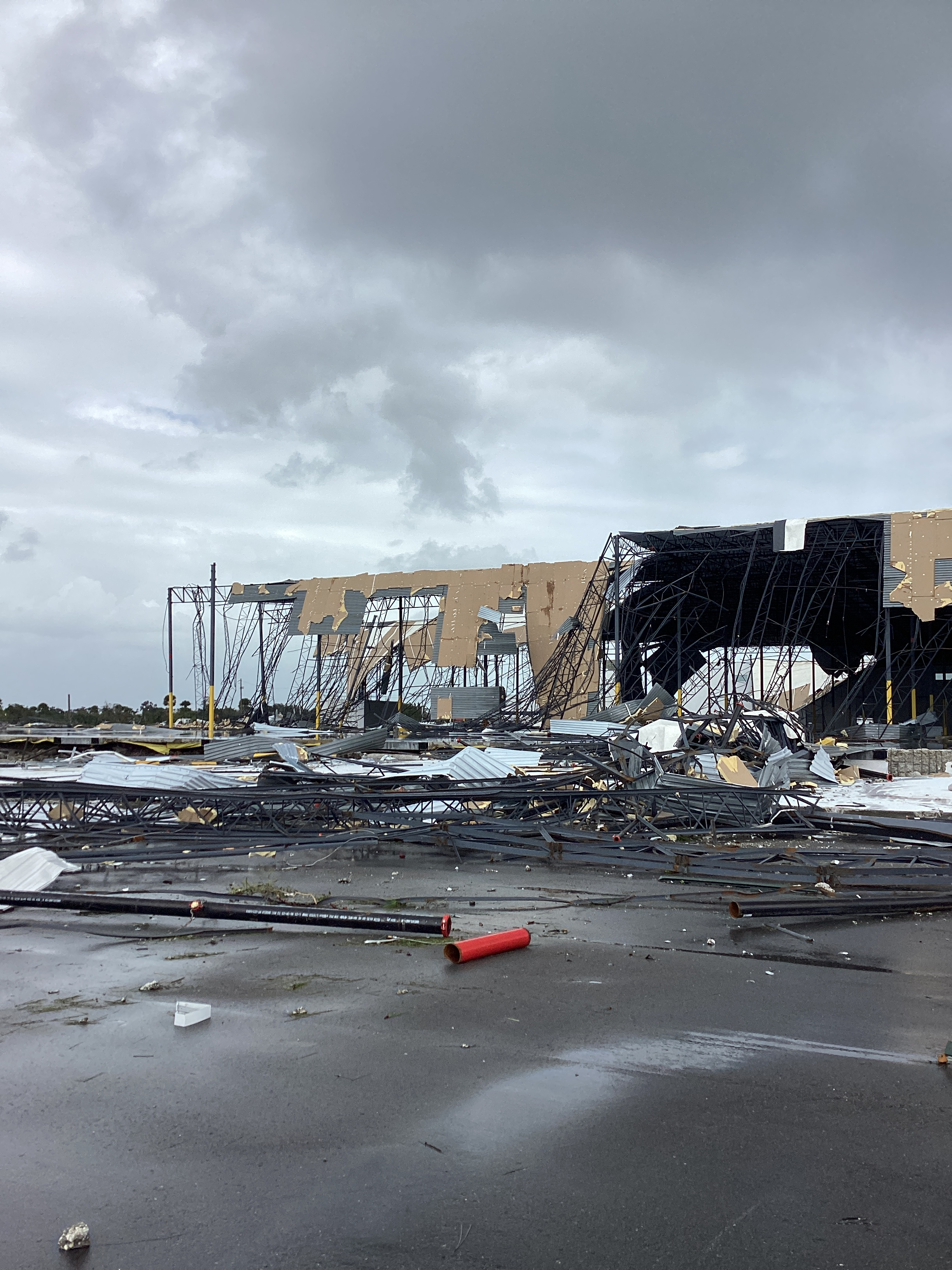
High-end EF3 damage to the South Florida Logistics Center warehouse near Fort Pierce.

The tornado then crossed into Indian River County into Vero Beach, where multiple properties suffered extensive roof and outbuilding damage and trees were uprooted. A Publix in Florida Ridge suffered broken windows, and air conditioning units on the roof of the store were dislodged and tossed to the ground.

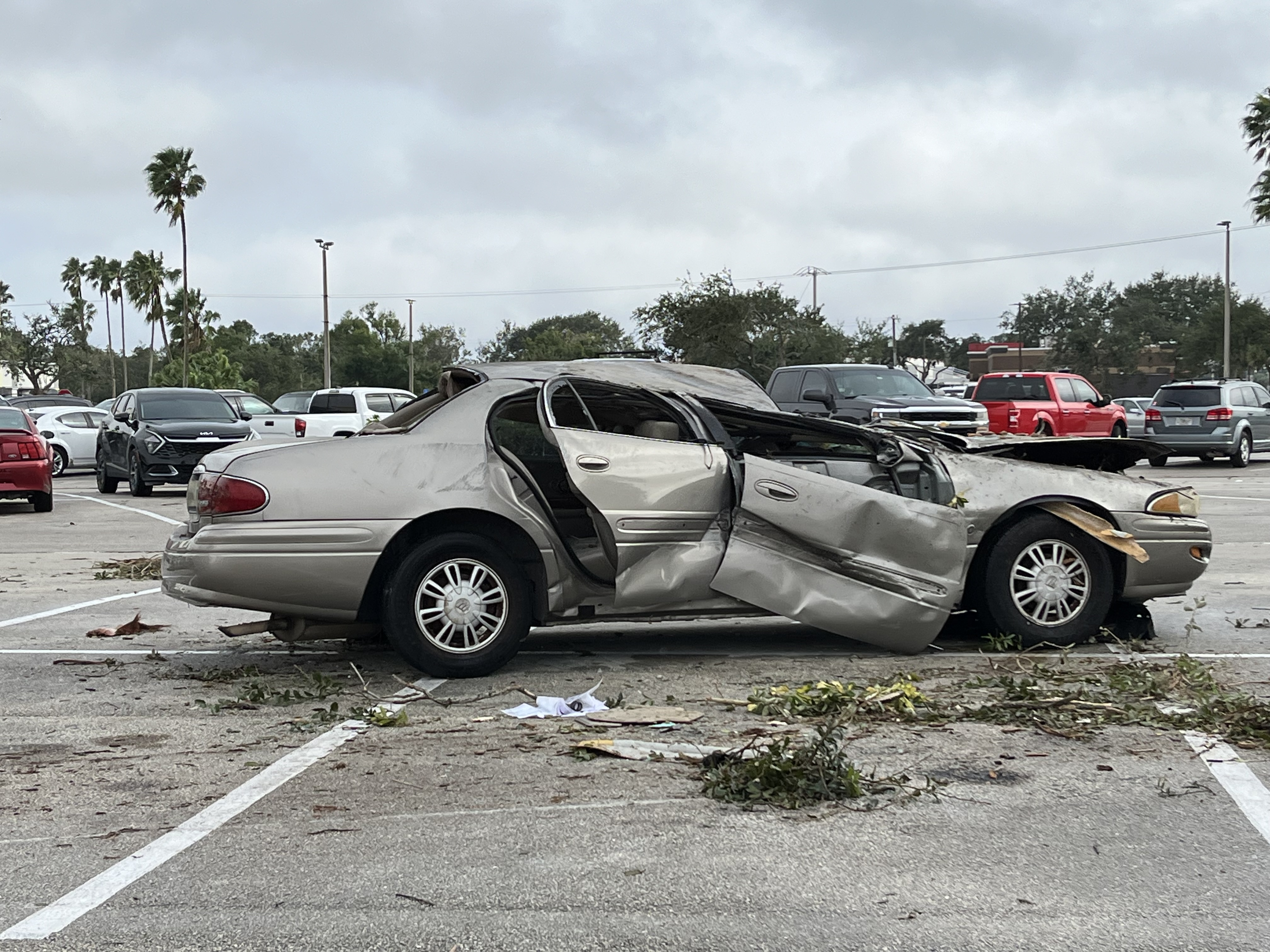
Tornado damage to a vehicle in Florida Ridge

A car was also flipped over in the parking lot. The tornado then crossed the Indian River onto barrier islands, immediately impacting a condominium upon landfall. Sections of the roof were torn off on the east and west buildings and thrown northward into a tree line. A pontoon boat was lifted out of the water and landed upside down on a sea wall. Tree limbs were downed, and shingles and roof tiles were ripped off of homes and businesses on the barrier island. The tornado tracked through a small park, uprooting a seagrape tree before moving offshore and later dissipating.

During the tornado, many lives were reportedly saved on Winter Garden Parkway, as a woman began honking her horn to alert others of the tornado. In addition to the fatalities, over 25 people required rescue during the tornado. This became one of the deadliest tornadoes spawned by a tropical cyclone in history, and one of the deadliest tornadoes in Florida (the deadliest since 2007).

== Aftermath ==
Thousands of people lost power in Vero Beach due to the tornadoes. A solar farm in Lake Placid was struck by a tornado, decreasing electricity production. Following the tornadoes, several volunteers and a church helped with tornado relief efforts across St. Lucie County. Deputies were stationed around Spanish Lakes to ensure only residents and first responders could enter in the aftermath of the tornado. WPTV-TV partnered with 7 local businesses to fundraise for tornado victims. Emergency response operations began after the tornado outbreak. Multiple counties across the state reported damage to homes, local businesses, power outages, tree damage, and severe damage to mobile homes. A 105-year-old woman sustained a foot injury and a bruised back after an EF1 tornado hit her residence in Port Salerno while inside of a bathroom.

== See also ==
- Hurricane Ida tornado outbreak
- Hurricane Katrina tornado outbreak
- Hurricane Rita tornado outbreak
- List of North American tornadoes and tornado outbreaks

== Sources ==
- National Weather Service (June 1972). Storm Data Publication (Report). National Centers for Environmental Information – via Storm Events Database.
