= Kenansville =

Kenansville is the name of two communities in the United States:

- Kenansville, North Carolina
- Kenansville, Florida
