= USCIS West Palm Beach Field Office =

United States Citizenship and Immigration Services West Palm Beach Field Office
- Interactive map of the United States Citizenship and Immigration Services West Palm Beach Field Office area

General information
- Location: 9300 Belvedere Road, Royal Palm Beach, Florida, United States
- Coordinates: 26.6909°N 80.1956°W
- Completed: August 2009
- Client: Glades County, Florida, Hendry County, Florida, Highlands County, Florida, Indian River County, Florida, Martin County, Florida, Okeechobee County, Florida, Palm Beach County, Florida, St. Lucie County, Florida

Technical details
- Size: Length - 270 feet (82 m), Width - 155 feet (47 m), Area of main building - 41,850 square feet (3,888 m^{2}), Area of maintenance building 525 square feet (48.8 m^{2})

The United States Citizenship and Immigration Services (USCIS) West Palm Beach Field Office replaced a hodge podge of USCIS offices mainly located in nearby West Palm Beach, Florida. The new center was officially opened August 13, 2009. The new Field Office (actually in Royal Palm Beach) is located on the south side of Belvedere Road among a variety of office and commercial buildings. It has free parking, something that some of the previous buildings in West Palm Beach did not have. Directly south of the building is a long rectangular man-made pond that serves as a drainage basin for the area.

This USCIS Field Office handles a variety of immigration issues, including naturalization to become United States citizens (including the oath of citizenship ceremonies) and interim employment authorization cards for persons who are waiting for their cases to be resolved. This center processes immigration cases for the eight Florida counties of Glades, Hendry, Highlands, Indian River, Martin, Okeechobee, Palm Beach, and St. Lucie.

As of February 2013, this Field Office was the third-busiest in Florida in having appointments concerning temporary protected status applications, with 6,325 persons applying for this status. Of the 40,130 case nationwide, 30,895 were in Florida. Temporary protected status allows a person to live and work legally in the United States for limited period of time.
