= The Acreage, Florida =

- CDP
- Location within Palm Beach County and the state of Florida
- Coordinates: 26°44′35″N 80°15′08″W
- Country: United States
- State: Florida
- County: Palm Beach
- Elevation: 16 ft (4.9 m)

Population (2020)
  - Total: 41,654
- Time zone: UTC-5 (EST)
  - Summer (DST): UTC-4 (EDT)
- Zip codes: 33411, 33412, 33470
- Area codes: 561, 728
- GNIS ID: 2628565
- Website: www.indiantrail.com

The Acreage is a census-designated place (CDP) located in Palm Beach County, Florida, United States. It is part of the Miami metropolitan area of South Florida. The population of the CDP had 41,654 residents in the 2020 US census.

== Geography ==
The CDP is located north of Royal Palm Beach, Wellington, and Loxahatchee Groves, and is approximately 18 miles (29 km) northwest of West Palm Beach. It straddles the western fringes of the highly developed eastern portion of Palm Beach County and the agricultural-rural western portions. Its large, spacious home site lots, dirt roads and many wooded areas give the area a rural character, although it is widely considered to be an exurban outgrowth of the South Florida Metropolitan Area. The Acreage is located solely within the Indian Trail Improvement District, responsible for maintaining the road and drainage systems within its boundaries. The Acreage's ZIP codes are 33411 (Royal Palm Beach), 33412 (West Palm Beach), and 33470 (Loxahatchee).

== History ==
The Acreage was originally developed by Samuel Friedland and his development company, Royal Palm Beach Colony, Inc., with the name of Royal Palm Beach Colony, as a community to house workers that were employed by the nearby Callery Judge and Mecca Citrus Groves. Workers were given 1-acre (4,000 m^{2}) lots and coupled with few land restrictions.

Isolated local flooding occurs yearly, leading sometimes to road closures, with Hurricane Irene being the most memorable to the area. The 2004 hurricane season, in which Hurricane Frances and Hurricane Jeanne struck the area in a three-week period, doing considerable damage to the older, wooden cottage style houses while the modern houses in the area received mostly cosmetic damage.

On October 9, 2024, the town was hit by an EF3 tornado spawned by Hurricane Milton, which caused significant damage in the community, as well as in neighboring Loxahatchee Groves, Palm Beach Gardens, and Wellington.

It is also surrounded by several nature preserves, and the area blurs the line between rural and suburban. Rapid development of the area has a recent push for incorporation and is now notably more built up than nearby semi-rural Loxahatchee Groves and suburban Westlake.

== Demographics ==
Historical population
Census	Pop.	Note	%±
2010	38,704		—
2020	41,654		7.6%
U.S. Decennial Census

The Acreage first appeared as a census designated place in the 2010 U.S. census.

=== Racial and ethnic composition ===
The Acreage CDP, Florida – Racial and ethnic composition Note: the US Census treats Hispanic/Latino as an ethnic category. This table excludes Latinos from the racial categories and assigns them to a separate category. Hispanics/Latinos may be of any race.
Race / Ethnicity (NH = Non-Hispanic)	Pop 2010	Pop 2020	% 2010	% 2020
White alone (NH)	24,939	23,892	64.44%	57.36%
Black or African American alone (NH)	4,972	4,978	12.85%	11.95%
Native American or Alaska Native alone (NH)	81	104	0.21%	0.25%
Asian alone (NH)	989	1,132	2.56%	2.72%
Native Hawaiian or Pacific Islander alone (NH)	21	26	0.05%	0.06%
Other race alone (NH)	155	429	0.40%	1.03%
Mixed race or Multiracial (NH)	666	1,885	1.72%	4.53%
Hispanic or Latino (any race)	6,881	9,208	17.78%	22.11%
Total	38,704	41,654	100.00%	100.00%

=== 2020 census ===
As of the 2020 census, The Acreage had a population of 41,654. The median age was 41.7 years. 4.4% of residents were under the age of 5, 21.5% were under 18, and 13.3% were 65 years of age or older. For every 100 females there were 101.8 males, and for every 100 females age 18 and over there were 100.7 males age 18 and over.

100.0% of residents lived in urban areas, while 0.0% lived in rural areas.

There were 13,332 households in The Acreage, of which 36.0% had children under the age of 18 living in them. Of all households, 64.9% were married-couple households, 13.4% were households with a male householder and no spouse or partner present, and 14.1% were households with a female householder and no spouse or partner present. About 11.7% of all households were made up of individuals and 4.2% had someone living alone who was 65 years of age or older. The average household size was 3.28.

There were 13,813 housing units, of which 3.5% were vacant. The homeowner vacancy rate was 1.4% and the rental vacancy rate was 5.3%.

Racial composition as of the 2020 census
Race	Number	Percent
White	26,350	63.3%
Black or African American	5,119	12.3%
American Indian and Alaska Native	198	0.5%
Asian	1,159	2.8%
Native Hawaiian and Other Pacific Islander	34	0.1%
Some other race	2,147	5.2%
Two or more races	6,647	16.0%

=== 2010 census ===
As of the 2010 United States census, there were 38,704 people, 11,634 households, and 9,704 families residing in the CDP.

== Economy ==
Commercial businesses, shopping and schools are mostly located on the fringes of the area, notably Northlake Boulevard/Coconut Boulevard and Orange Boulevard/Seminole Pratt Whitney Road, while the center of area is mostly residential with a few garden nurseries on the major streets.

A proposed post office is expected to open up in the 33412 area of the town along with a pharmacy, supermarket food chains, doctor's offices, and bank chains.

In April 2012, The Acreage Branch Library opened to serve the local community. The Acreage Branch is a 30,000-square-foot facility on Orange Blvd. just east of Seminole Pratt Whitney Road. It is the first LEED-certified county building. The branch has a variety of materials including CDs, DVDs, new arrivals, books, newspapers and magazines. There are four private study rooms and a larger group study room. Express lending stations for fast, efficient service. There are two-themed areas designed especially for children and teens with ample room for materials and comfortable seating. Study carrels and lounge seating areas throughout the branch. Special features include a family restroom with child-sized facilities. The branch also features an Art in Public Places light sculpture, "Productive Light", by Laura Haddad and Tom Drugan. The sculpture includes a suspended "orange tree" light sculpture, a photovoltaic system, an interactive "sun panel". The branch has horse hitching post stations for those arriving on horseback.

McDonald's also recently made its home at the intersection of Seminole Pratt and Orange, next to Walgreens. Four country clubs are now included in the 33412 area of The Acreage including the Ibis Country Club where house prices can exceed $3 million. Land taxes and insurance prices are among the highest in Palm Beach County, far surpassing those of anywhere else in the western communities.

=== Housing ===
The Minto Westlake housing development passed with 5 votes to begin construction building its 4,500-home community. While the new development expects to have an economic impact of over $1 billion over the next decade, it conflicts with the rural feel of The Acreage, and thus has been met with a mix of opposition and encouragement in the decision to develop. Westlake incorporated as a city in 2016.

== Parks and recreation ==
The community features nine parks. The Acreage Athletic League is the area's youth sports provider.

- Acreage Community Park
- Bob Hoefl Park
- Citrus Grove Park
- Coconut Park
- Downers Park
- Kidscape Park
- Nicole Hornstein Equestrian Park
- Sycamore Park
- Temple Park

== Education ==
The community is served by the School District of Palm Beach County.

- Acreage Pines Elementary School
- Frontier Elementary School
- Golden Grove Elementary School
- Pierce Hammock Elementary School
- Osceola Creek Middle School
- Western Pines Middle School
- Seminole Ridge Community High School
- ALLSTAR Kids - Private School
- Planet Kids - Private School
- Palm Beach State College- Loxahatchee Groves Campus

== Media ==
The area is served by the Sun-Sentinel, West Palm Beach WPTV-TV, Radio, the Town-Crier and The Palm Beach Post.

== Infrastructure ==
=== Transportation ===
There are a few major paved roads in the community, with the vast majority of the roads unpaved, partly due to the equestrian presence in the area. Local residents have been deadlocked for years on creating additional roadway access to the area to relieve heavy traffic on the existing roadway network, as many residents want to maintain the peace and quiet in this rural area, and additional proposed roadways were impacting environmental conservation areas. The ongoing State Road 7 road extension is one such example. The Florida Department of Transportation applied in 2006 to extend State Road 7 to Northlake Blvd to improve access to the Acreage. However, the US Department of Interior's Fish and Wildlife Service and several environmental groups noted the potential impact on the Grassy Waters Preserve and the road's effect on the endangered Snail Kite. This application to extend State Road 7 was delayed. However, in May, 2025, an Administrative Law Judge ruled in favor of the Florida Department of Transportation. Palm Beach County appealed the ruling. However, the Federal Department of Transportation is still preparing to move ahead with the project.

=== Utilities ===
The area is not served by sewer and water systems and almost all homes have on-site well and septic systems. On-site ponds, large drainage swales, numerous canals, and houses on elevated land pads help alleviate flooding in this flat, low lying inland area.

=== Health care ===
- Palms West Hospital
- Wellington ER at Westlake

== See also ==
- Loxahatchee
- Loxahatchee Groves
- Westlake
