= Loxahatchee Groves, Florida =

Town in the state of Florida, United States

- Town
- Town of Loxahatchee Groves
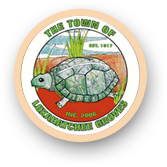
- Seal
- Motto(s): Florida's Last Frontier; Love it and Leave it Alone
- Location in Palm Beach County and the state of Florida
- Coordinates: 26°42′32″N 80°15′35″W
- Country: United States
- State: Florida
- County: Palm Beach
- Settled: 1917
- Incorporated: November 1, 2006

Government
  - Type: Council-Manager
  - Mayor: Lisa El-Ramey
  - Vice Mayor: Manish Sood
  - Council Members: Joe Stephens, Anita Kane, and Paul Coleman II
  - Town Manager: Valerie Oakes
  - Town Clerk: Gabriella Croasdaile

Area
  - Total: 12.53 sq mi (32.45 km^{2})
  - Land: 12.51 sq mi (32.40 km^{2})
  - Water: 0.015 sq mi (0.04 km^{2})
- Elevation: 20 ft (6.1 m)

Population (2020)
  - Total: 3,355
  - Density: 268.2/sq mi (103.54/km^{2})
- Time zone: UTC-5 (Eastern (EST))
  - Summer (DST): UTC-4 (EDT)
- ZIP code: 33470
- Area codes: 561, 728
- FIPS code: 12-41577
- GNIS feature ID: 2406054
- Website: www.loxahatcheegrovesfl.gov

Loxahatchee Groves is a town in Palm Beach County, Florida, United States. The community had been settled since 1917, but didn't become a town until November 1, 2006, as the 38th municipality in Palm Beach County. It was incorporated primarily in order to protect the area from the encroaching urbanization of South Florida, as nearby cities continued to develop and to preserve the area's rural lifestyle. The town is part of the Miami metropolitan area. As of the 2020 US census, the town had a population of 3,355.

== Etymology ==
Loxahatchee Groves derives its name from the Loxahatchee River. "Loxahatchee" is from the Seminole people's Muscogee language. It is a combination of two of their words lowchow (turtle) and hatchee (river), thus translating to "river of turtles".

== Geography ==
Loxahatchee Groves is bounded on the east by Royal Palm Beach, on the south by Wellington, and on the west and the north by The Acreage and Loxahatchee. It has an area of approximately 12.53 square miles (32.5 km^{2}).

== History ==
The area now known as Loxahatchee Groves was originally a portion of the 2,000,000 acres (8,100 km^{2}) of land purchased by the Southern States Land and Timber Company in 1902. After the West Palm Beach Canal (C-51), which connected Lake Okeechobee at Canal Point to West Palm Beach, was completed in 1917, George Frederick Bensel, the Southern States sales manager, envisioned a "waterfront" farming community along the canal. Bensel, and company engineer Torvald Garfield "T. G." Thorgesen, created the first topographical map of Loxahatchee Groves during the following three years. Bensel, Thorgesen, and others then established the Palm Beach Loxahatchee Company, and bought 6,500 acres (26 km^{2}) from the Southern States Land and Timber Company, naming the land "Loxahatchee Farms". The Palm Beach Loxahatchee Company built almost 30 mi (48 km) of canals and roads, which were to be maintained by the Loxahatchee Groves Drainage District, that now is known as the Loxahatchee Groves Water Control District.

Bensel opened a combined gas station, grocery store, and post office in 1925. Loxahatchee Groves received extensive damage during the 1928 Okeechobee hurricane, with almost every home knocked off of its foundations. Bensel's brother Thomas began a project in the 1930s which encouraged the residents to plant citrus, resulting in about 56,000 new trees being planted. A water pump was built at State Road 80 (Southern Boulevard) and D Road during that time. The pump allowed water to be drawn from the West Palm Beach Canal. The Palm Beach Loxahatchee Company sold Loxahatchee Groves to Loxahatchee Investments in 1958.

The production of citrus and tomatoes decreased following George Bensel's death in 1961. Significant development in Royal Palm Beach and Wellington took place in the 1980s and 1990s. Some residents of Loxahatchee Groves believed that the rural lifestyle and the landscape of the area were under threat.

A movement for incorporating Loxahatchee Groves, for the purpose of preserving the rural lifestyle of the area, began in 2003 as a consequence. The residents voted 458–350 in favor of incorporation on October 10, 2006, and on November 1, 2006, the Town of Loxahatchee Groves was officially incorporated as the 38th municipality in Palm Beach County. The first election for town council members was held on March 13, 2007. Dave Autrey, David Browning, Marge Herzog, Bill Louda, and Dennis Lipp were the first elected council members, while Browning was selected to be mayor and Herzog was chosen to be vice mayor at the first town council meeting on March 29, 2007. Prior to the election, a political forum for the candidates was hosted at a naturist resort, drawing a crowd of about 100 people.

On October 9, 2024, the town was hit by an EF3 tornado spawned by Hurricane Milton, which caused significant damage in the community, as well as in nearby Wellington, Palm Beach Gardens, and The Acreage.

== Demographics ==
Historical population
Census	Pop.	Note	%±
2010	3,180		—
2020	3,355		5.5%
U.S. Decennial Census

=== 2020 census ===
As of the 2020 census, Loxahatchee Groves had a population of 3,355. The median age was 48.1 years. 17.0% of residents were under the age of 18 and 20.5% were 65 years of age or older. For every 100 females there were 109.7 males, and for every 100 females age 18 and over there were 109.9 males age 18 and over.

58.9% of residents lived in urban areas, while 41.1% lived in rural areas.

There were 1,199 households in Loxahatchee Groves, of which 27.0% had children under the age of 18 living in them. Of all households, 48.6% were married-couple households, 22.4% were households with a male householder and no spouse or partner present, and 22.4% were households with a female householder and no spouse or partner present. About 24.7% of all households were made up of individuals and 9.4% had someone living alone who was 65 years of age or older.

There were 1,292 housing units, of which 7.2% were vacant. The homeowner vacancy rate was 1.5% and the rental vacancy rate was 4.9%.

Loxahatchee Groves racial composition (Hispanics excluded from racial categories) (NH = Non-Hispanic)
Race	Number	Percentage
White (NH)	2,330	69.45%
Black or African American (NH)	96	2.86%
Native American or Alaska Native (NH)	1	0.03%
Asian (NH)	76	2.27%
Pacific Islander or Native Hawaiian (NH)	0	0.00%
Some other race (NH)	19	0.57%
Two or more races/Multiracial (NH)	145	4.32%
Hispanic or Latino (any race)	688	20.51%
Total	3,355	

According to 2020 American Community Survey 5-year estimates, there were 929 families residing in the town.

=== 2010 census ===
Loxahatchee Groves Demographics
2010 Census	Loxahatchee Groves	Palm Beach County	Florida
Total population	3,180	1,320,134	18,801,310
Population density	256.5/sq mi	670.2/sq mi	350.6/sq mi
White or Caucasian (including White Hispanic)	87.2%	73.5%	75.0%
(Non-Hispanic White or Caucasian)	74.2%	60.1%	57.9%
Black or African-American	3.1%	17.3%	16.0%
Hispanic or Latino (of any race)	18.7%	19.0%	22.5%
Asian	1.6%	2.4%	2.4%
Native American or Native Alaskan	0.3%	0.5%	0.4%
Pacific Islander or Native Hawaiian	0.0%	0.1%	0.1%
Two or more races (Multiracial)	1.9%	2.3%	2.5%
Some Other Race	0.1%	3.9%	3.6%

As of the 2010 United States census, there were 3,180 people, 1,051 households, and 857 families residing in the town.

In 2010, 24.4% of the households had children younger than the age of 18 living with them. 55.0% were married couples living together; 8.4% had a female householder with no husband present; and 29.7% were non-families. Approximately 26.1% of the households had an individual who was 65 years of age or older. The average household size was 2.26, and the average family size was 3.02.

== Education ==
=== Primary and secondary schools ===
The School District of Palm Beach County serves Loxahatchee Groves. Public schools in Loxahatchee Groves and schools serving Loxahatchee Groves include:

- Loxahatchee Groves Elementary School
- Western Pines Middle School
- Seminole Ridge Community High School

=== Colleges ===
Palm Beach State College (PBSC) opened a campus in Loxahatchee Groves in February 2017 to serve college students in The Acreage, Loxahatchee, Loxahatchee Groves, Royal Palm Beach, and Wellington. The college was named after former school president Dennis P. Gallon. The campus covers 50,000 ft^{2} (4,600 m^{2}) of space. It features 20 classrooms and computer labs, a large multi-propose room, and a doctor's office simulation room. The campus does not include a cafe, nor a library, nor a bookstore. It is possible that those may be included in the construction of two additional buildings that have been planned, depending on enrollment numbers.

== Transportation ==
U.S. routes 98 and 441 and State Road 80 jointly move east-to-west along the southern end of the town, a road which is known locally as Southern Boulevard. Okeechobee Boulevard, designated as State Road 704 to the east of Royal Palm Beach, also runs east-to-west through the town. Palm Tran Route 40, which runs from downtown West Palm Beach to Belle Glade, has a few stops along Southern Boulevard in Loxahatchee Groves and just outside the town limits.

== Recreation ==
Loxahatchee Groves includes the following parks and recreational areas:

- Loxahatchee Groves Park
- Sunsport Gardens Family Naturist Resort
- Lion Country Safari is located just west of the town's boundaries. Lion Country Safari features a drive-through safari park and a walk-through amusement park.

== South Florida Sod Farm ==
Since 2019, Loxahatchee Groves has been home to the South Florida Sod Farm, a property owned by Stephen M. Ross and the Miami Dolphins. It is the only sod farm owned by a professional sports franchise in the United States. The farm spans 96 acres and is capable of growing 20 full-size fields simultaneously. The farm, which grows Tifway 419 Bermuda grass, is used as the playing surface at Hard Rock Stadium and the Dolphins' Baptist Health Training Complex.
