= Loxahatchee, Florida =

- Unincorporated community
- Location within the state of Florida
- Coordinates: 26.7716°N 80.2388°W
- Country: United States
- State: Florida
- County: Palm Beach
- Elevation: 9.8 ft (3.0 m)
- Time zone: UTC-5 (Eastern (EST))
  - Summer (DST): UTC-4 (EDT)
- ZIP code: 33470
- Area code: 561
- GNIS feature ID: 294872

Loxahatchee is an unincorporated community in Palm Beach County, Florida, United States, located north of Wellington, and west and northwest of Royal Palm Beach, approximately 17 miles (27 km) west of West Palm Beach. Loxahatchee is under the zip code of 33470.

The community took its name from the Loxahatchee River. Loxahatchee is located within the Indian Trails Improvement District and the Loxahatchee Groves Water Control District.

Lion Country Safari, a drive-through safari park, is located in Loxahatchee.

The state of Florida approved the incorporation of part of Loxahatchee, as the Town of Loxahatchee Groves, in 2006, which became the 38th municipality in Palm Beach County. The main reason for incorporating was to protect the area from encroaching growth, and to preserve the rural character of the neighborhood.

Loxahatchee is perhaps the most rural area within proximity to West Palm Beach, with lot sizes ranging from 1–20 acres (0.40–8.09 ha). Loxahatchee and the adjacent The Acreage are notable for loose land restrictions and the presence of native and exotic animals.

== Education ==
Elementary schools:

- Acreage Pines Elementary School
- Golden Groves Elementary School
- Loxahatchee Groves Elementary School
- Frontier Elementary School
- Pierce Hammock Elementary School
- Saddle View Elementary School

Middle schools:

- Western Pines Middle School
- Osceola Creek Middle School

High school:

- Seminole Ridge Community High School

== Notable residents ==
- Brooke Eden (born 1988), country singer
- Ángel Hernández (born 1961), baseball umpire
- Nick Rickles (born 1990), American-Israeli baseball player
- Robert Stempel (1933–2011), chairman and CEO of General Motors

== See also ==
- The Acreage, Florida
- Loxahatchee Groves, Florida
