= Indian Trail Improvement District =

Taxing district in Palm Beach County, Florida

Coordinates: 26.7667°N 80.2549°W

The Indian Trail Improvement District in Florida is a taxing district responsible for the improvements and maintenance of swales, canals, roads, and parks in a 37-square-mile (96 km^{2}) area of central Palm Beach County, Florida. The Indian Trail Improvement District serves over 40,000 residents in central Palm Beach County.

== History ==
The Indian Trail Improvement District was created by the Florida Legislature in 1957 for the purpose of reclaiming the lands within its boundaries for water control, water supply, and protecting the land within its boundaries from the effects of water by using the construction and maintenance of canals, ditches, levees, dikes, pumping plants, and other works and improvements. The legislative boundaries included 17,000 developed lots encompassing a 110+ square mile area, along with citrus grove and sugar cane production. As a “Special District” they provide drainage, road grading and improvements, plus a neighborhood park system.

From 1990 to 1992 the District only employed 5 full-time employees including the District Administrator. The District was governed by a seven-member Board of Supervisors. All works of the district were contracted out to local contractors. In 1996 the District had grown to 16 employees, still being governed by a 7-member Board, and most of the District work load was still contracted out. By 2000 the District had grown to 41 full-time employees, some of the contracted work was being brought in house, still governed by a 7-member Board. The District currently serves over 40,000 residents and employs 65 full-time employees. The District is now supervised by an elected, 5 member Board who meet monthly to conduct District business.

== Departments ==
=== Administration ===
The administration department handles all incoming phone calls, which include resident operation and maintenance requests, culvert stake out and final inspection requests, road paving and stabilization requests, tax questions, park rental requests, employment inquires, committee and association information requests, and questions about services provided by other governmental entities. The administration office also handles all walk in visitors, all permit requests for gates, culverts and parks.

=== Operations and maintenance ===
The operations and maintenance department is responsible for all works done for any water control plan, and for the maintenance of such works. The operations and maintenance department is responsible for grading the roads, maintaining the swales and the canal system to make sure that the water flow is not obstructed. They are responsible for all road paving and stabilization projects, retrofits, culvert stake out and final inspections, and all maintenance requests that are taken by the administration department.

=== Parks ===
The parks department is responsible for the operation and maintenance of the nine parks that are owned by the District. They are also responsible for planning and development new parks. They maintain the fields, playgrounds, pavilions, and all areas of the parks system. They also take care of all special events that are put on in the parks by the District.

== District statistics ==
- Maintenance of approximately 182.5 miles (293.7 km) of canal system to provide drainage protection throughout the 37 square miles (96 km^{2}) of the active units of the District.
- 983 miles (1,582 km) of swales.
- Fourteen (14) major canal crossings.
- Five (5) pump stations and twelve (12) control structures.
- Roads:
  - 358 miles (576 km) of unpaved roads
  - 120 miles (190 km) of paved roads
  - 10 miles (16 km) of stabilized roads
- Develop, maintain and operate nine (9) parks.

== See also ==
- Loxahatchee, Florida
- The Acreage, Florida
