= Jupiter Farms, Florida =

Human settlement in Palm Beach County, Florida, US

- CDP
- Nickname: The Farms
- Interactive map of Jupiter Farms, Florida
- Coordinates: 26°54′45″N 80°14′10″W
- Country: United States
- State: Florida
- County: Palm Beach

Area
  - Total: 15.09 sq mi (39.09 km^{2})
  - Land: 15.08 sq mi (39.06 km^{2})
  - Water: 0.012 sq mi (0.03 km^{2})
- Elevation: 20 ft (6.1 m)

Population (2020)
  - Total: 12,572
  - Density: 834/sq mi (321.9/km^{2})
- Time zone: UTC-5 (Eastern (EST))
  - Summer (DST): UTC-4 (EDT)
- ZIP code: 33418, 33478
- Area codes: 561, 728
- FIPS code: 12-35890
- GNIS feature ID: 2585597

Jupiter Farms is a census-designated place (CDP) and an agriculture residential community in Palm Beach County, Florida, United States. It is located west of Florida's Turnpike on Indiantown Road (County Road 706), the major highway through the community. Jupiter Farms is composed of roughly 15 square miles (39 km^{2}) of land, and is part of the Miami metropolitan area of South Florida. As of the 2020 US census, the CDP's population had 12,572 residents.

== Geography ==
Jupiter Farms is located west of the Jupiter, southwest of Tequesta, and north of Palm Beach Gardens.

== Demographics ==
Historical population
Census	Pop.	Note	%±
2010	11,994		—
2020	12,572		4.8%
U.S. Decennial Census

Jupiter Farms first appeared as a census designated place in the 2010 U.S. census.

=== 2020 census ===
Jupiter Farms racial composition (Hispanics excluded from racial categories) (NH = Non-Hispanic)
Race	Number	Percentage
White (NH)	10,241	81.46%
Black or African American (NH)	154	1.23%
Native American or Alaska Native (NH)	23	0.18%
Asian (NH)	161	1.28%
Pacific Islander or Native Hawaiian (NH)	4	0.03%
Some Other Race (NH)	50	0.40%
Mixed/Multiracial (NH)	478	3.80%
Hispanic or Latino (any race)	1,461	11.62%
Total	12,572	100.00%

As of the 2020 census, Jupiter Farms had a population of 12,572. The median age was 45.7 years. 21.5% of residents were under age 18, and 17.5% were age 65 or older. For every 100 females, there were 102.8 males, and for every 100 females age 18 and over, there were 102.3 males age 18 and over.

91.6% of residents lived in urban areas, while 8.4% lived in rural areas.

There were 4,379 households, of which 32.8% had children under age 18 living in them. Of all households, 68.3% were married-couple households, 12.5% had a male householder with no spouse or partner present, and 13.8% had a female householder with no spouse or partner present. About 14.1% of households were made up of individuals, and 6.2% had someone living alone who was age 65 or older. There were 4,561 housing units, of which 4.0% were vacant. The homeowner vacancy rate was 1.6%, and the rental vacancy rate was 8.9%.

=== Demographic estimates ===
According to the Census Bureau's 2020 American Community Survey 5-year estimates, there were 3,602 families residing in the CDP.

=== 2010 census ===
Jupiter Farms racial composition (Hispanics excluded from racial categories) (NH = Non-Hispanic)
Race	Number	Percentage
White (NH)	10,517	87.69%
Black or African American (NH)	128	1.07%
Native American or Alaska Native (NH)	25	0.21%
Asian (NH)	117	0.98%
Pacific Islander or Native Hawaiian (NH)	3	0.03%
Some Other Race (NH)	23	0.19%
Mixed/Multiracial (NH)	145	1.21%
Hispanic or Latino (any race)	1,036	8.64%
Total	11,994	

As of the 2010 United States census, there were 11,994 people, 3,932 households, and 3,165 families residing in the CDP.

== Notable residents ==
- Actor Burt Reynolds previously owned Burt Reynolds Ranch off Jupiter Farms Road.
- Former NFL player and 2012 hall of fame inductee Willie Roaf
