= Lake Clay =

Lake in the state of Florida, United States

- Location within Florida Location within the United States
- Location: northeast edge of Lake Placid, Florida
- Coordinates: 27°18′35″N 81°20′54″W
- Type: natural freshwater lake
- Basin countries: United States
- Max. length: 3,490 feet (1,060 m)
- Max. width: 2,805 feet (855 m)
- Surface area: 353.33 acres (143 ha)
- Max. depth: 29 feet (8.8 m)
- Surface elevation: 75 feet (23 m)

Lake Clay, on the north edge of Lake Placid, Florida, has a surface area of 353.33-acre (1,429,900 m^{2}). Lake Clay is almost completely surrounded by residences. Only a few small grassy undeveloped areas exist around the lake. Blue Lake (Florida), a small round lake, is 610 feet (190 m) west of Lake Clay.

Lake Clay has public access at two public boat ramps. One is on the east side of the lake, at 1650 Lake Clay Drive, and the other is on the west side, at 1300 Lake Clay Drive. Lake Clay Drive surrounds three-fourths of Lake Clay. The lake has no public swimming beach. There is no information about the types of fish in the lake available.
