= Royal Palm Beach, Florida =

- Village
- Village of Royal Palm Beach
- Flag

- Location of Royal Palm Beach in Palm Beach County, Florida
- Coordinates: 26°42′45″N 80°14′22″W
- Country: United States
- State: Florida
- County: Palm Beach
- Incorporated: June 18, 1959; 67 years ago

Government
  - Type: Mayor-Council
  - Mayor: Jeff Hmara (D)
  - Vice Mayor: Selena Samios
  - Councilmembers: Jan Rodusky, Sylvia L. Sharps Elect, and Richard Valuntas
  - Village Manager: Raymond C. Liggins
  - Village Clerk: Diane DiSanto

Area
  - Total: 11.70 sq mi (30.29 km^{2})
  - Land: 11.34 sq mi (29.38 km^{2})
  - Water: 0.35 sq mi (0.91 km^{2})
- Elevation: 16 ft (4.9 m)

Population (2020)
  - Total: 38,932
  - Density: 3,431.8/sq mi (1,325.03/km^{2})
- Time zone: UTC-5 (Eastern (EST))
  - Summer (DST): UTC-4 (EDT)
- ZIP codes: 33411, 33414, 33470
- Area codes: 561, 728
- FIPS code: 12-62100
- GNIS feature ID: 2407540
- Website: royalpalmbeachfl.gov

Royal Palm Beach is a village in southeast Florida, located within Palm Beach County. Despite its name, the village is located approximately fifteen miles (24 km) inland from the Atlantic Ocean. It is part of the Miami metropolitan area. The population was at 38,932 residents in the 2020 US census.

Royal Palm Beach is known for its many parks and general mission to protect green space, as evidenced by the recent acquisition of 190 acres (0.77 km^{2}) to create a master central park and the development of 25 acres (100,000 m^{2}) preserved into a passive bird watching and nature park. The village offers a variety of activities for the outdoor and sports enthusiast including soccer, basketball, tennis, youth Pop Warner Football and cheerleading, senior activities, and year-round golf programs. The public schools within the Village consist of "A"-rated elementary and middle schools and there are numerous private schools offering classes from pre-kindergarten through high school.

== History ==
Incorporated on June 18, 1959, Royal Palm Beach has grown from a primarily uninhabited swamp and natural preserve and former Seminole hunting ground into a thriving village.

It was not until the 1950s, when Philadelphia supermarket magnates of Food Fair, Sam and Hattie Friedland, purchased 65,000 acres (260 km^{2}) for approximately $1.25 million in what is now the Royal Palm Beach village and The Acreage areas, that the natural wilderness landed on national fastest growing community lists (in its size category) in the 1980s. The Friedlands subsequently sold their land to Miami developer Arthur Desser, founder of Lefcourt Realty Group. About 4,200 acres (17 km^{2}) were earmarked for Desser's Royal Palm Beach development.

It was Desser's vision that spurred the initial development of the Village of Royal Palm Beach. A massive drainage project ensued and in 1959, the state legislature granted a charter which named the development Royal Palm Beach.

According to a former Lefcourt engineer living in nearby Wellington, Desser wanted the name "Palm Beach" to be included in the new community's name, so it was decided that since Desser also liked the stately royal palms of Palm Beach, he would dub his development "Royal Palm Beach."

On June 30, 1959, with Seminole tribe officials on hand for the festivities (and to renounce all former claims to the land), a groundbreaking ceremony was held. Engineering began for the village's myriad waterways and a basic system of roads. A sales/recreational center was built with a motel facility in the area now occupied by the Royal Inn and two bedroom, one-bath model homes were erected starting at $8,250.

Village government—initially in the form of a developer-appointed council—later became popularly elected in 1964. Not until 1977 did the Village Council find a permanent home in the present Village Hall complex. To date, there have been 15 mayors who have served the village—some as single-term and part-term mayors—others, like Sam Lamstein (1982–1990), formal County Commissioner Tony Masilotti (1992–1998), and current Mayor David Lodwick (since 1998) have won voter approval for multi-terms.

Arthur Desser's dream of a "nouveau" Palm Beach were short-lived, however, with the bankruptcy of Lefcourt in 1961. His interest was bought out by Friedland who then established Royal Palm Beach Colony Inc. to continue village development. A grocery store magnate with no experience in the housing market, Friedland nonetheless was a savvy businessman who put together a team of professionals who set up a comprehensive land sales/development/building enterprise. With the late Herbert Kaplan as RPB Colony CEO, the company and the town grew slowly from 1960-67 — first in the original "Colony" section of floral-named streets east and west of the southern end of Royal Palm Beach Blvd., and then expanded with vigor into the Willows and LaMancha subdivisions (east of RPB Blvd.).

A marketing push began in 1979 to offer to builders tracts of land. With this growth phase the Village ballooned over the next 15 years. In 1983, Crestwood Middle School opened as the first community school followed in 1985 and 1989, respectively, by H.L. Johnson and Cypress Trails Elementary schools. Royal Palm Beach High School opened its doors to 1,100 students in 1997. Schools in the western communities continue to open in rapid succession — often with student bodies at or near capacity the first year. The 2002–2003 school year included the opening of the village's third elementary school on Okeechobee Blvd., just west of the Madison Green residential development.

In 1986, both Palms West Hospital and Wellington Regional Medical Center opened with 117 and 120 beds, respectively, and both are continuing with major expansion projects to meet the health care needs of local residents. With the hospitals came a building boom of medical office complexes on the campuses of both hospitals, as well as a Royal Palm Beach health center built by West Palm Beach's Good Samaritan Medical Center.

In June 1960, Joseph Klopp became the first Royal Palm Beach police chief. That first year, "Klopp the Cop" was the sole full-time officer with several auxiliary part-timers. Today, the accredited department counts nearly 50 sworn officers in addition to dispatchers, school crossing guards, detectives, a captain, and the chief based in a modern, computerized department in a building within the Village Hall complex. In 2007 the policing duties were contracted out to the Palm Beach County Sheriff's department in order to save money.

Royal Palm Beach residents have also appreciated the security of a local fire department since a volunteer force of eight individuals was recruited in a construction trailer in January 1963. In 1969, the department moved its headquarters to a maintenance building in the present Commerce Park, which featured three bays and two trucks. A final move in 1976 to the department's building on Royal Palm Beach Blvd. enabled the department to expand its manpower and equipment. At that time, the department shared the building with the police department.

Village firefighters weren't paid until 1972 and the two full-timers on staff made about $6,000 a year. The following year, three more full-time firefighters were hired, and in 1975, Karl Combs became the first full-time chief at a salary of $13,500 a year. With a growing population, and thankfully few structural fires, the focus of the department expanded to include emergency medical treatment. Combs and a department lieutenant were enrolled in the county's first paramedic-rescue course and, less than a week later, answered a cardiac arrest call for a village resident who would have died had Combs not taken the course. Within the next four years, the department hired 18 additional paramedic/EMT trained firefighters. A second station opened in 1994 at the entrance of the Counterpoint Estates to cut response times to residents living in the State Road 7 area. In March 1999, following a council-authorized study by consultants, a controversial and much-debated decision was made to curtail an independent village fire department and instead merge equipment and personnel with Palm Beach County Fire-Rescue.

Village recreation needs were not overlooked during the booming growth period and since 1974. Under the department's purview are approximately 325 acres (1.32 km^{2}) of parks and green space as well as the village's 6,300-square-foot (590 m^{2}) Cultural Center which opened in 1993.

Since 1990, Royal Palm Beach has been named as a Tree City USA. Its entire area is designated as a bird sanctuary.

== Geography ==
According to the United States Census Bureau, the village has a total area of 10.1 square miles (26.1 km^{2}), of which 9.9 square miles (25.6 km^{2}) is land and 0.2 square mile (0.5 km^{2}) (1.79%) is water.

=== Climate ===
Royal Palm Beach has a tropical climate, similar to the climate found in much of the Caribbean. It is part of the only region in the 48 contiguous states that falls under that category. More specifically, it generally has a tropical monsoon climate (Köppen climate classification, Am).

== Demographics ==
Historical population
Census	Pop.	Note	%±
1960	11		—
1970	475		4,218.2%
1980	3,423		620.6%
1990	14,589		326.2%
2000	21,523		47.5%
2010	34,140		58.6%
2020	38,932		14.0%
U.S. Decennial Census

=== Racial and ethnic composition ===
Royal Palm Beach racial composition (Hispanics excluded from racial categories) (NH = Non-Hispanic)
Race	Pop 2010	Pop 2020	% 2010	% 2020
White (NH)	17,445	16,000	51.10%	41.10%
Black or African American (NH)	7,452	8,600	21.83%	22.09%
Native American or Alaska Native (NH)	42	61	0.12%	0.16%
Asian (NH)	1,418	1,898	4.15%	4.88%
Pacific Islander or Native Hawaiian (NH)	14	13	0.04%	0.03%
Some other race (NH)	151	352	0.44%	0.90%
Two or more races/Multiracial (NH)	668	1,506	1.96%	3.87%
Hispanic or Latino (any race)	6,950	10,502	20.36%	26.98%
Total	34,140	38,932		

=== 2020 census ===
As of the 2020 census, Royal Palm Beach had a population of 38,932. The median age was 40.1 years. 22.8% of residents were under the age of 18 and 15.1% of residents were 65 years of age or older. For every 100 females there were 90.4 males, and for every 100 females age 18 and over there were 86.4 males age 18 and over.

There were 13,450 households in Royal Palm Beach, of which 38.6% had children under the age of 18 living in them. Of all households, 55.5% were married-couple households, 12.3% were households with a male householder and no spouse or partner present, and 26.1% were households with a female householder and no spouse or partner present. About 17.8% of all households were made up of individuals and 8.1% had someone living alone who was 65 years of age or older.

There were 14,296 housing units, of which 5.9% were vacant. The homeowner vacancy rate was 1.5% and the rental vacancy rate was 10.7%.

100.0% of residents lived in urban areas, while 0.0% lived in rural areas.

=== Demographic estimates ===
In 2020, the American Community Survey estimated that 9,708 families resided in the village.

=== 2010 census ===
As of the 2010 United States census, there were 34,140 people, 10,856 households, and 8,453 families residing in the village.

=== 2000 census ===
In 2000, there were 7,604 households, of which 63.9% were child-free married couples, 42% had children under the age of 18 living in them, 11% had a female householder with no husband present, and 21.4% were non-related individuals. 17.2% of all households were made up of individuals, and 8.8% had someone living alone who was 65 years of age or older. The average household size was 2.83 and the average family size was 3.20.

In 2000, the village, the population was spread out, with 28.6% under the age of 18, 6.5% from 18 to 24, 30.8% from 25 to 44, 20.8% from 45 to 64, and 13.3% who were 65 years of age or older. The median age was 37 years. For every 100 females, there were 91.3 males. For every 100 females age 18 and over, there were 87.6 males.

In 2000, the median income for a household in the village was $54,766, and the median income for a family was $61,063. Males had a median income of $39,356 versus $29,991 for females. The per capita income for the village was $21,875. About 3.7% of families and 4.3% of the population were below the poverty line, including 5.2% of those under age 18 and 5.9% of those age 65 or over.

As of 2000, speakers of English as a first language accounted for 85.80% of all residents, while Spanish was at 11.49%, and Tagalog as a mother tongue made up 0.48% of the population.

As of 2000, Royal Palm Beach had the eighty-ninth highest percentage of Cuban residents in the US, with 2.95%, while its Jamaican community had the thirty-second highest percentage in the US, with 4.10% of the population (tied with Tamarac and Goulds.)

== Local government ==
Royal Palm Beach is governed by a mayor-council government.

=== Mission statement ===
The Mission of the Village of Royal Palm Beach Mayor and Council is to represent the public interest, promote quick, courteous response to residents' problems, provide leadership and direction to the Village's future, and assure the present and future fiscal integrity of the municipal government. The Village of Royal Palm Beach strives to provide its citizens with a clean, safe, family oriented community.

=== Mayor ===
Mayor Jeff Hmara has stepped in to assume Pinto's responsibilities and was elected in March 2025.

=== City Council ===
The city council consists of four chairs. As of March 2025, the following are established and filled as:

- Seat 1: Mayor Councilman Jeff Hmara (March 2027)
- Seat 2: Councilman Richard Valuntas (March 2027)
- Seat 3: Councilwoman Sylvia L. Sharps (March 2027)
- Seat 4: Councilwoman Jan Rodusky (March 2027)

== Public safety ==
=== Fire and Rescue Department ===
Currently, Palm Beach County Fire-Rescue provides fire protection and emergency medical services to the citizens of Royal Palm Beach. There are two fire stations assigned to the village:

- Station 28 – Engine 28, Rescue 28, Brush 28 and 3 command vehicles;
- Station 29 – Rescue 29, Truck 29.

Station 28 is the headquarters for Battalion 2, which covers Royal Palm Beach and the other Palms West Communities.

=== Police Department ===
Law enforcement in Royal Palm Beach is provided by the Palm Beach County Sheriff's Office: District 9, which operates from a sub-station in Royal Palm Beach, and is staffed by 56 sworn deputies and 5 civilian employees. It is commanded by Captain Ulrich Naujoks and Lieutenant Michael B. Ferrante.

== Federal government ==
Located at 9300 Belvedere Road, the USCIS West Palm Beach Field Office handles a variety of immigration matters for eight Florida counties.

== Local newspapers ==
The Town-Crier is a weekly, or more frequent, newspaper specifically located in and serving the Palms West Communities of Royal Palm Beach, Wellington, Loxahatchee Groves and The Acreage. Published weekly, the Town-Crier was founded by Bob Markey Sr. and family, but was sold in 1998 to the Manning family. The Town-Crier was published twice-weekly, with featured editions in nearby communities, on its own printing presses during the 1980s and early 1990s. The Town-Crier published the first newspaper Web site in Palm Beach County in 1995.

Palms West Monthly is a monthly news and features paper published by Rob Harris in and for the communities of Royal Palm Beach, Wellington and environs.

The Palm Beach Post is a daily newspaper serving all of Palm Beach County.

== Parks and recreation ==
Royal Palm Beach Commons: encompasses a 19-acre lake, providing visitors with three miles of paved walking and biking trails. Outdoor amenities include a golf driving range, disc golf fields, a wedding pavilion, two sand volleyball courts, playgrounds, and picnic pavilions. The park is located at 11600 Poinciana Blvd, Royal Palm Beach, FL.

Veteran's Park: features a playground area for children, including a playscape and small splash pad. The park has picnic tables, open turf, and a small amphitheater. Seeds Café is located within the park and regarded as a hidden gem by many residents, open Wednesday through Sunday from 8:30 AM to 1:30 PM.

Royal Palm Beach Pines Natural Area: is a 773-acre area of protected land in Royal Palm Beach, Florida that includes pine flatwoods and wet prairie. There are hiking and equestrian trails, a nature trail, and boardwalk.

Preservation Park : offers a variety of recreational facilities, including pickleball courts, a skate arena, and soccer and football fields. The park features a soccer complex, a toddler play area and playscape, as well as weight rooms and gym facilities. Basketball courts are also available, making it a comprehensive destination for sports and outdoor activities.

== Notable people ==
- Julian Battle (born 1981), football player
- Mandy Freeman (born 1995), soccer player
- L. J. Thorpe (born 1999), basketball player
