= Lion Country Safari =

Safari park in Loxahatchee, Florida, US

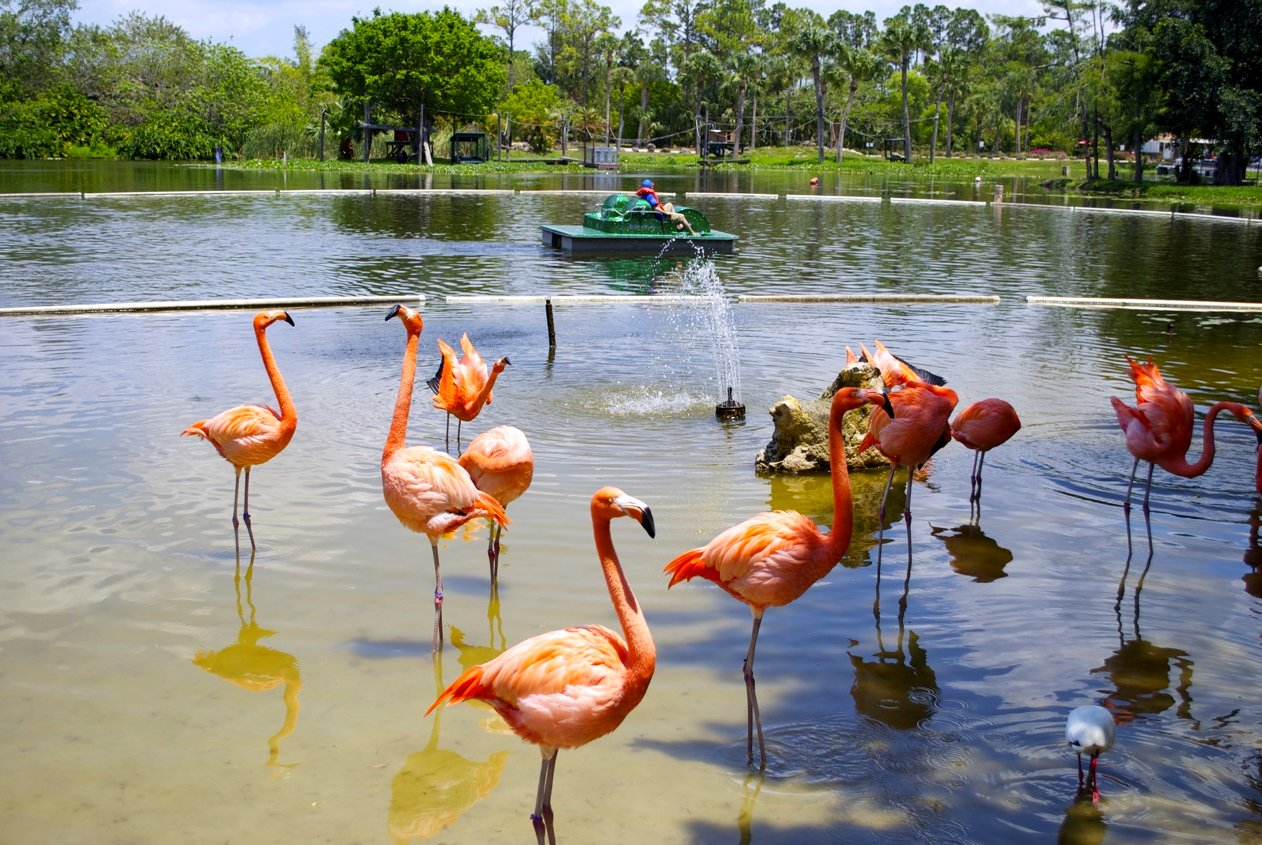
- Interactive map of Lion Country Safari
- 26°42′58″N 80°19′20″W
- Date opened: 1967; 59 years ago
- Location: Loxahatchee, Florida
- No. of animals: 1,000+
- Memberships: AZA
- Owner: Larry Ellison Foundation
- Website: www.lioncountrysafari.com

Lion Country Safari is a drive-through safari park and walk-through amusement park located on over 600 acres in Loxahatchee (near West Palm Beach), in Palm Beach County, Florida. In 2009, USA Travel Guide ranked Lion Country as the 3rd best zoo in the nation.

== History ==
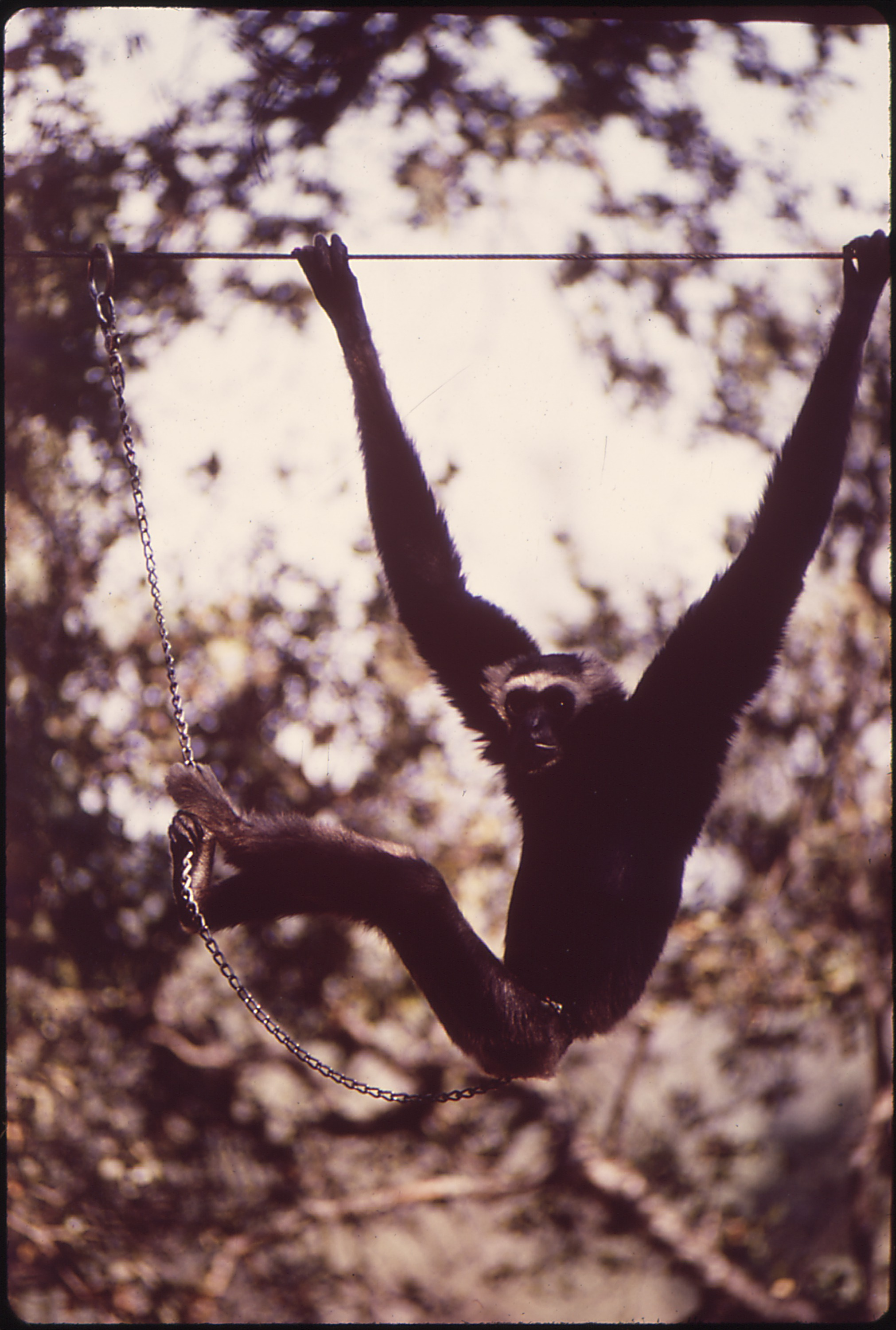
Historical image of a gibbon at the zoo interacting with an enrichment device.

Founded in 1967, the zoo claims to be the first 'cageless zoo' in the United States. Developed by a group of entrepreneurs, Lion Country Safari became a place where families could experience an African safari. Due to its year round climate, South Florida proved to be an ideal location for the park.

In the beginning, the park had its own 2 ft (610 mm) narrow gauge railroad, the Everglade Express. The architects of Lion Country Safari based the design of the property on Jack Murphy Stadium. This attraction was eventually closed and the Crown Metal Products 4-4-0 locomotive was put on static display.

Later, the locomotive was donated to the Gold Coast Railroad Museum in Miami before finally being bought and fully restored by the Veterans Memorial Railroad, located in Bristol, Florida's Veterans Memorial Park. It runs on that railroad to this day.

== Exhibits ==
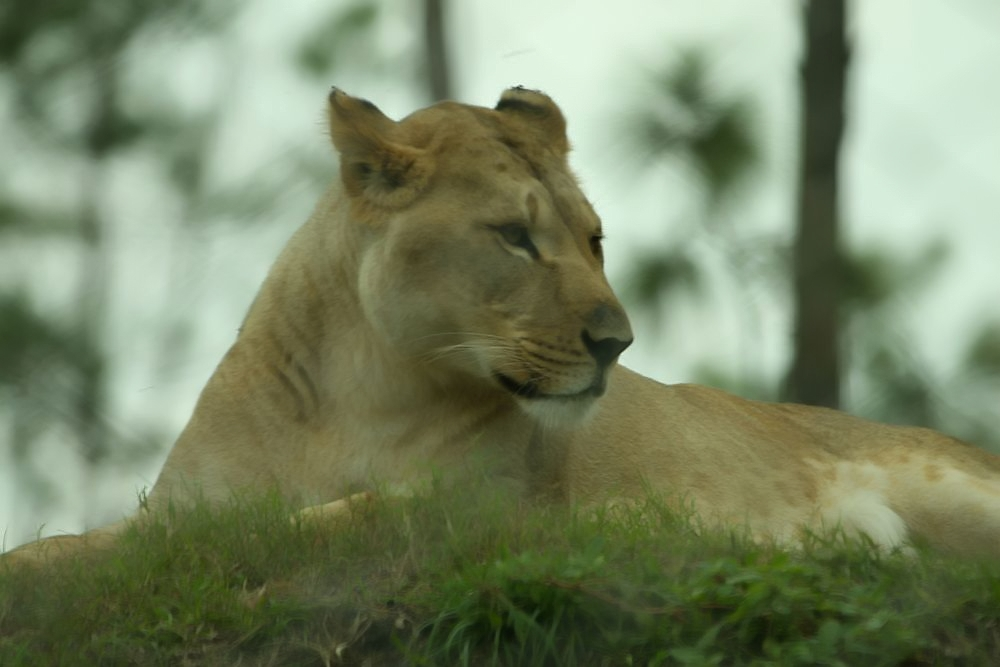
Many animals roam freely during the safari, but to maintain a safer environment, some animals are separated by barriers.

The park in Florida consists of over 1,000 animals, throughout seven sections in the 4-mile preserve as well as the 33-acre Amusement Park.

Visitors who purchase a ticket enter the park in their own vehicle (no convertibles or soft top covers), driving slowly at their own pace, and view the animals while listening to a recorded narration which is available via streaming from SoundCloud. Many of the animals, such as giraffes, southern white rhinos, antelope, and zebras, are allowed to roam freely throughout the preserve, even crossing the road in front of vehicles. Others, such as lions or apes, are segregated behind fences or water barriers.

Visitors are warned to drive slowly and carefully, to avoid stopping too close to animals, and not to open their car doors or windows. The lions, whose ability to roam freely with cars was one of the park's original attractions, were separated from visitors by a fence around the road in 2005, due to visitors ignoring warnings and opening their car doors. Additionally, opening windows near the frequently seen ostrich is not recommended, as they often peck on the reflective windows and windshields of passing cars.

A unique aspect of Lion Country Safari is the chimpanzee exhibit. The chimpanzees live on an island system where they move to a different island every day, replicating their natural nomadic lifestyle. The chimpanzees live in complex social groups, as they would in the wild. Because of this, Lion Country Safari has been useful to those interested in behavioral studies of chimpanzees. One of the chimpanzees, named Little Mama, recorded as the oldest known living chimpanzee, was born around 1938, died on November 14, 2017, from kidney failure. Lion Country Safari also serves as a retirement facility for chimpanzees who were once used in research laboratories and entertainment.

After visitors have driven through the park, they can visit Safari World, a theme park featuring exhibits, and amusement park fare such as an Animal Theater, a petting zoo, mini golf, paddle boats, and the popular giraffe-feeding exhibit. Food is available at Lion Country Safari's main restaurant.

== Gallery ==
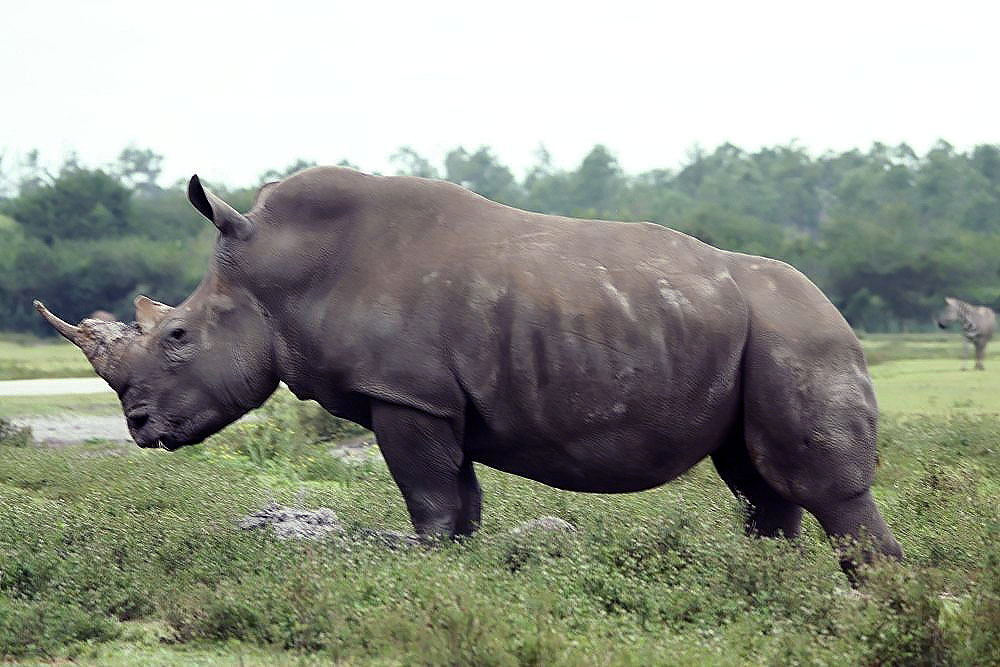
Driving slow during the safari allows animals to cross roads safely.

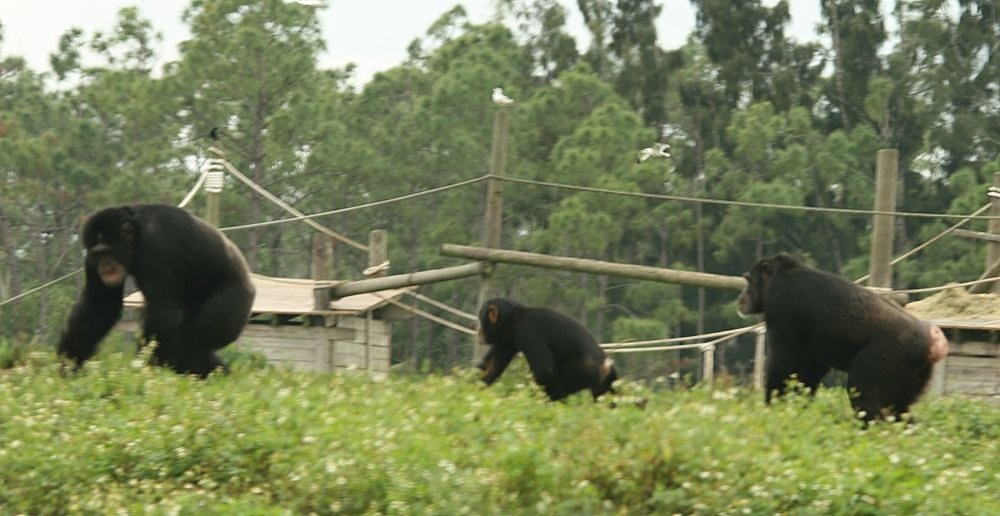
Part of the chimpanzee (Pan troglodytes) habitat.

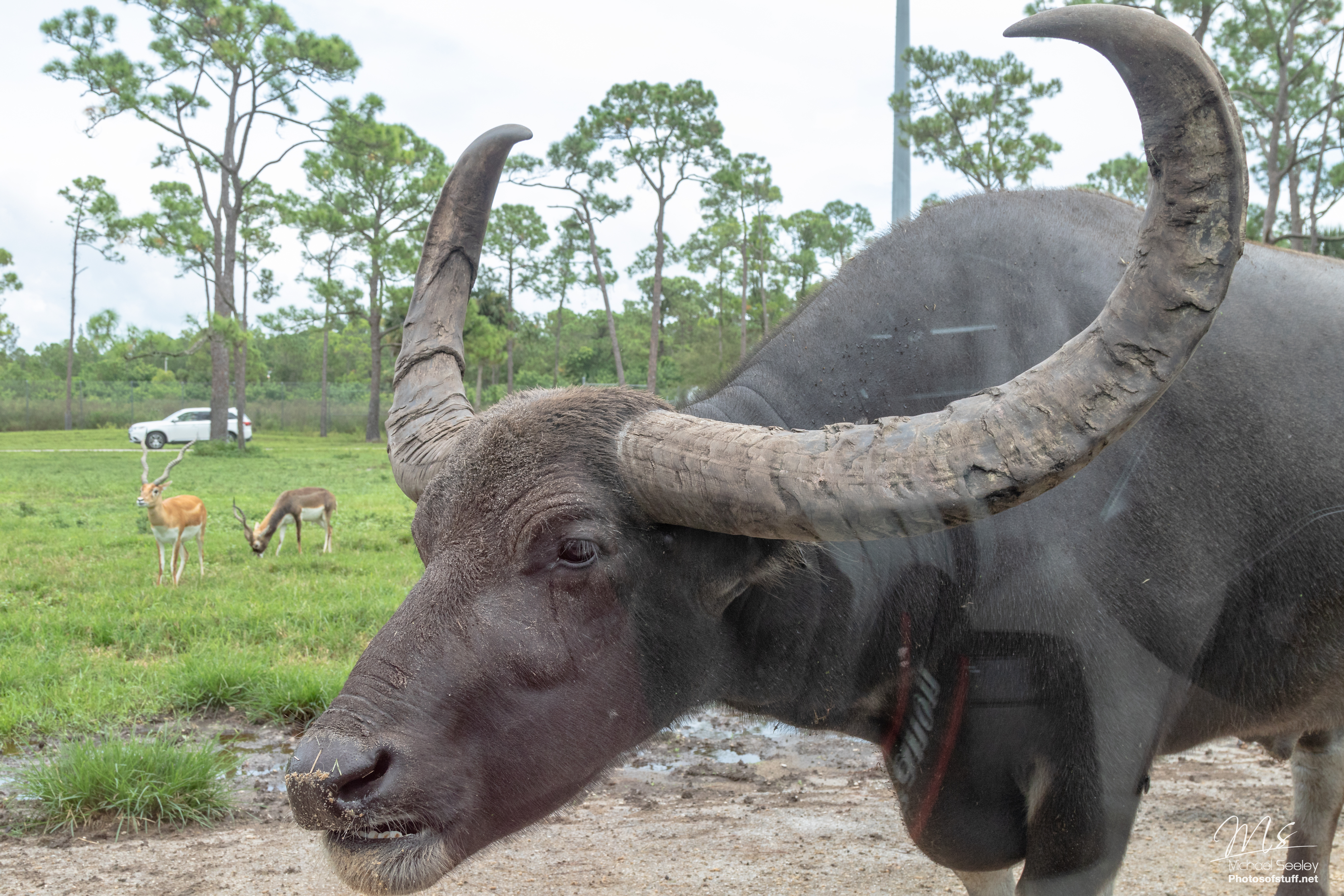
A water buffalo very close to a vehicle.

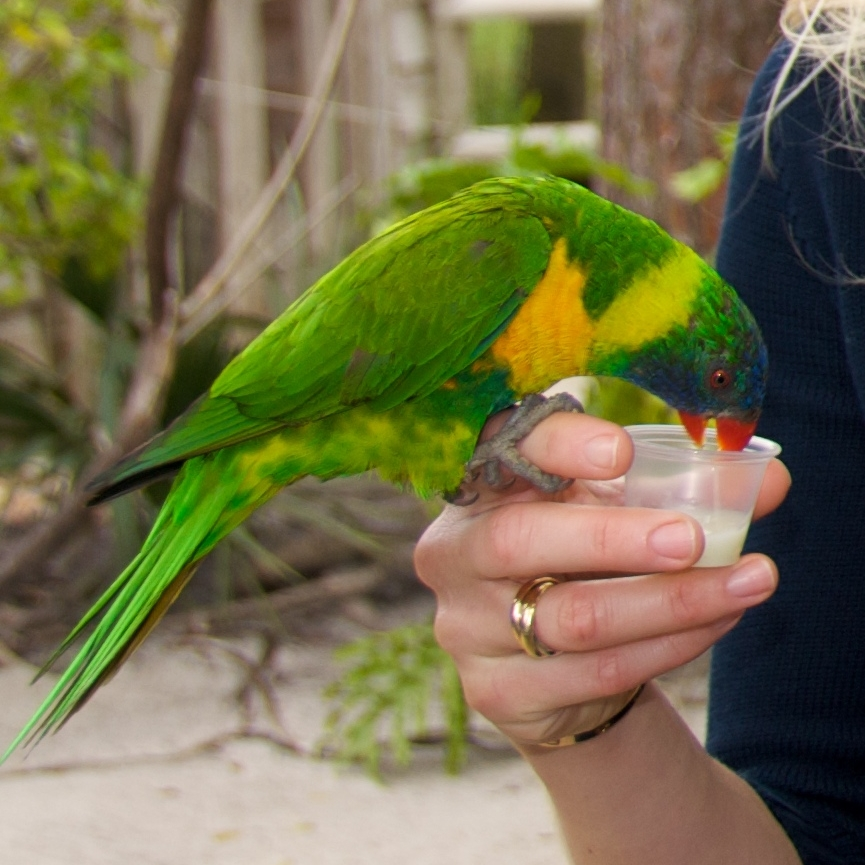
A visitor feeding a bird.

== In popular culture ==
- Lion Country Safari plays a major role in Frederick Buechner's 1971 novel Lion Country.
- The park was referenced in The Simpsons 1991 episode "Old Money" when the family takes a trip to Discount Lion Safari.
