= Kenansville, Florida =

Unincorporated community in Florida, U.S.

- Unincorporated community
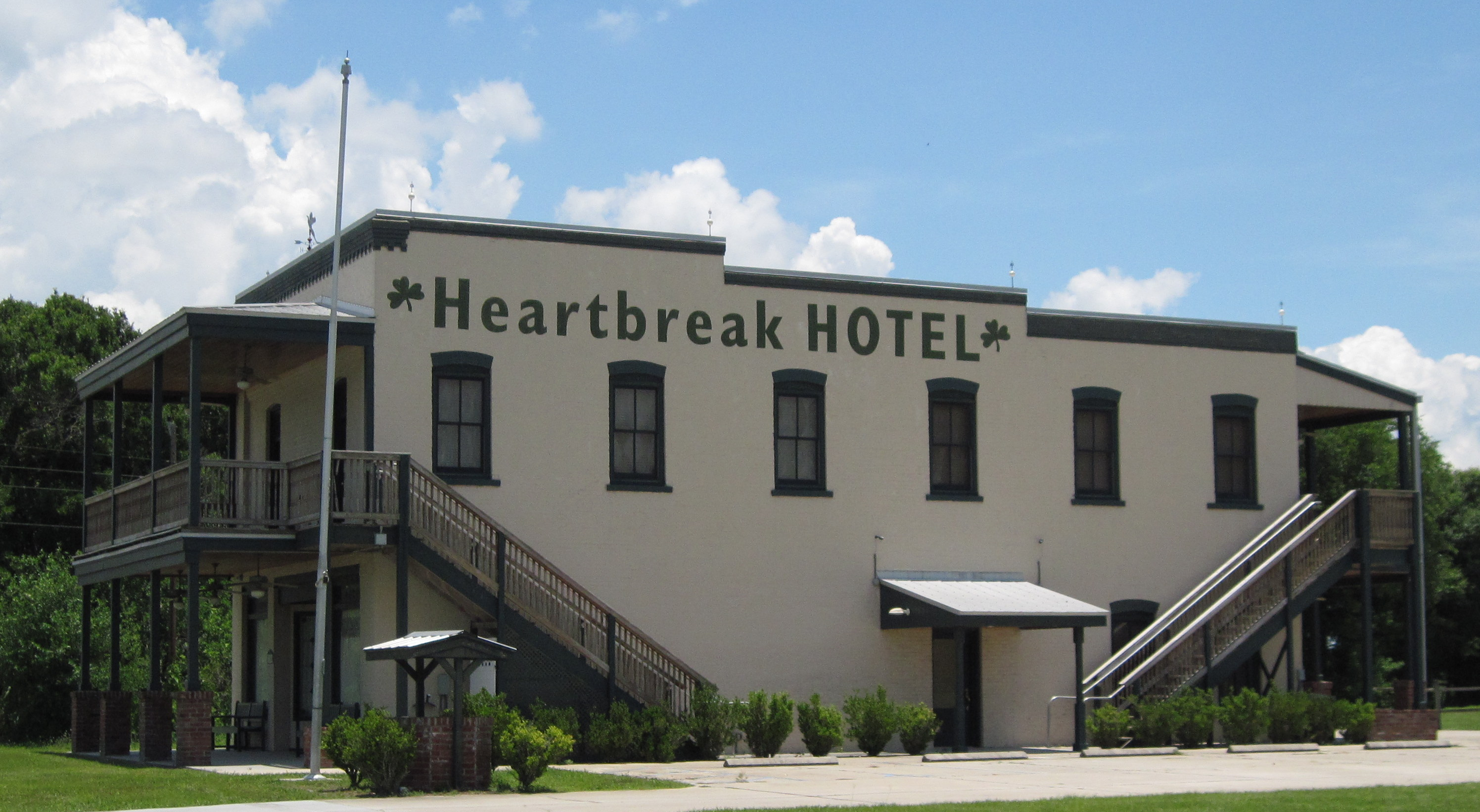
- Kenansville‘s Heartbreak Hotel

- Location within Florida Location within the United States
- Coordinates: 27°52′35″N 80°59′16″W
- Country: United States
- State: Florida
- County: Osceola
- Elevation: 79 ft (24 m)

Population (2020)
  - Total: 453
- Time zone: UTC-5 (Eastern (EST))
  - Summer (DST): UTC-4 (EDT)
- ZIP codes: 34739

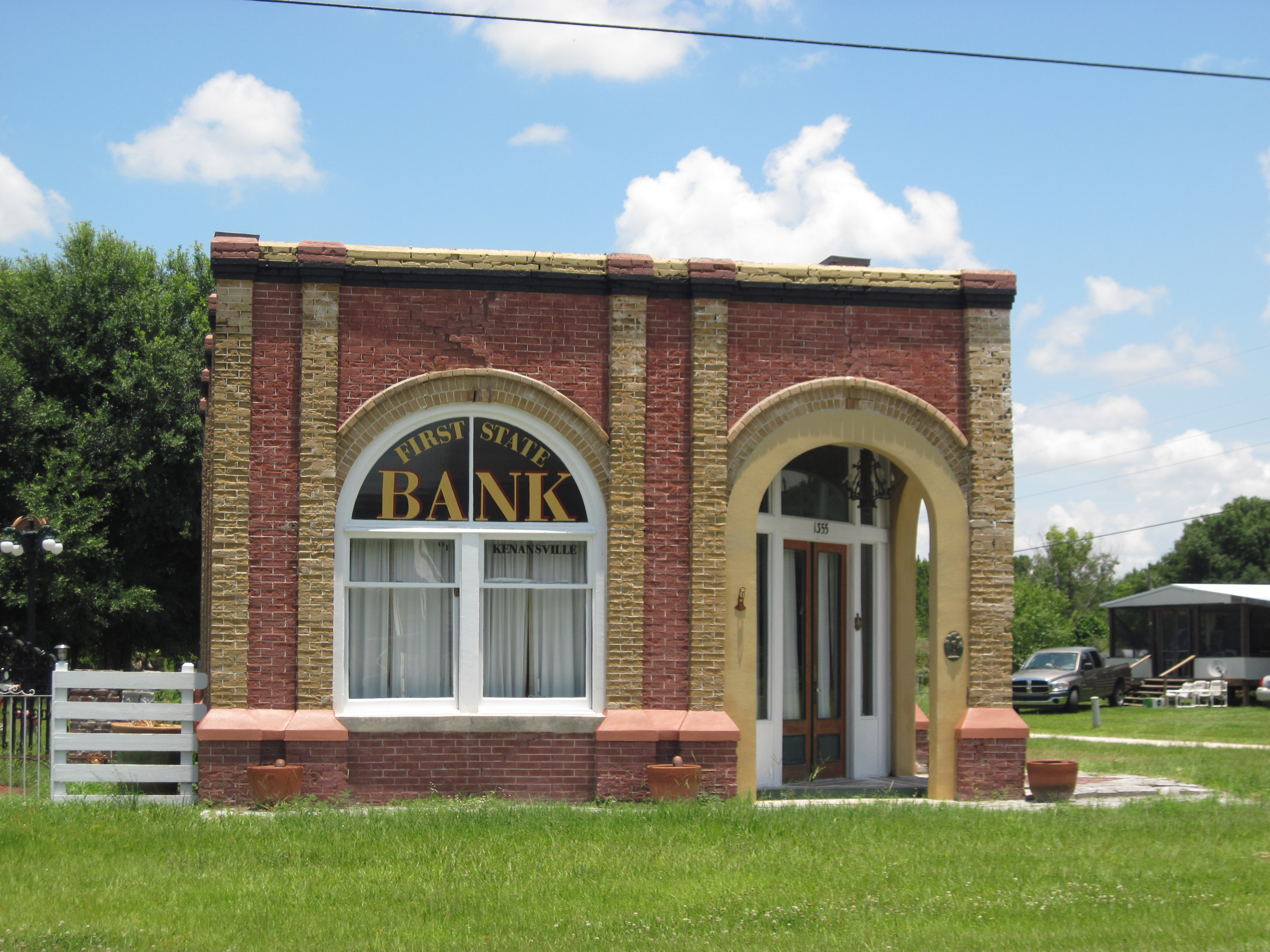
Old Kenansville bank

Kenansville is an unincorporated community in Osceola County, Florida, United States. It is approximately sixty-one miles southeast of the Greater Orlando urban region. The zip code is 34739.

== History ==
Kenansville was founded in the late 1800s when the Okeechobee spur of the Florida East Coast Railroad came to the area, bypassing nearby Whittier. The town was mostly centered around cattle and the possibility of providing services to travelers. The poorly drained, sandy Myakka, Smyrna and Immokalee soil series around town continue to be used as rangeland. The town received its name in 1914 and Kenansville comes from Henry Flagler's third wife Mary Lily Kenan. A legend claims that Elvis Presley had stayed at the Heartbreak Hotel and his experience there inspired him to write his song "Heartbreak Hotel". The Old Kenansville Bank, also known as The First Bank of Kenansville, houses The John F. Kerr retrospective on the history of the town. A series of acrylic paintings adorn the bank walls and highlight key moments in Kenansville History. The town declined in importance when the railroad spur was pulled out.

== Solar facility ==
On August 3, 2016, the Osceola Solar Facility opened halfway between Kenansville and St. Cloud. The facility takes up approximately 17 acres of land. It can provide approximately 3.6 megawatts at full power and provide power to 760 homes. It was created as part of Duke Energy's plan to switch over to more solar power and less coal power.

== Demographics ==
The population in Kenansville is 453 as of the 2020 United States census. The population density is 1.3 people per square mile. The median age in Kenansville is 52.1 years old. The number of people per household in Kenansville is 2.1.

54.4% of residents are married, 16.0% are divorced, 3.9% are married with children, and 16.0% have children, but are single. 87.1% of residents identify as Non-Hispanic white, 2.1% identify as black or African-American, and 10.8% identify as Hispanic or Latino of any race. 46.2% of residents identify as female, and 53.8% identify as male.

== Climate ==
Climate data for Kenansville, Florida, 1991–2020 normals, extremes 2000–present
Month	Jan	Feb	Mar	Apr	May	Jun	Jul	Aug	Sep	Oct	Nov	Dec	Year
Record high °F (°C)	87 (31)	90 (32)	93 (34)	93 (34)	96 (36)	98 (37)	97 (36)	98 (37)	98 (37)	93 (34)	90 (32)	89 (32)	98 (37)
Mean maximum °F (°C)	82.3 (27.9)	83.5 (28.6)	85.7 (29.8)	88.9 (31.6)	92.8 (33.8)	94.5 (34.7)	94.1 (34.5)	95.0 (35.0)	93.1 (33.9)	90.4 (32.4)	86.0 (30.0)	83.2 (28.4)	95.8 (35.4)
Mean daily maximum °F (°C)	71.8 (22.1)	74.9 (23.8)	77.8 (25.4)	82.0 (27.8)	86.2 (30.1)	89.0 (31.7)	90.6 (32.6)	90.8 (32.7)	88.6 (31.4)	84.2 (29.0)	78.8 (26.0)	73.9 (23.3)	82.4 (28.0)
Daily mean °F (°C)	60.5 (15.8)	63.7 (17.6)	66.6 (19.2)	71.3 (21.8)	76.3 (24.6)	80.1 (26.7)	81.7 (27.6)	82.0 (27.8)	80.3 (26.8)	75.4 (24.1)	68.9 (20.5)	63.5 (17.5)	72.5 (22.5)
Mean daily minimum °F (°C)	49.2 (9.6)	52.5 (11.4)	55.4 (13.0)	60.6 (15.9)	66.4 (19.1)	71.2 (21.8)	72.8 (22.7)	73.2 (22.9)	72.0 (22.2)	66.6 (19.2)	58.9 (14.9)	53.1 (11.7)	62.7 (17.1)
Mean minimum °F (°C)	33.9 (1.1)	37.2 (2.9)	41.7 (5.4)	49.4 (9.7)	58.1 (14.5)	66.5 (19.2)	69.3 (20.7)	70.3 (21.3)	67.3 (19.6)	53.0 (11.7)	43.8 (6.6)	39.9 (4.4)	31.6 (−0.2)
Record low °F (°C)	23 (−5)	30 (−1)	32 (0)	39 (4)	53 (12)	63 (17)	66 (19)	67 (19)	61 (16)	41 (5)	36 (2)	23 (−5)	23 (−5)
Average precipitation inches (mm)	2.67 (68)	2.24 (57)	3.03 (77)	3.15 (80)	4.00 (102)	7.82 (199)	7.62 (194)	7.70 (196)	7.44 (189)	4.44 (113)	2.16 (55)	2.61 (66)	54.88 (1,394)
Source: NOAA (mean maxima/minima 2006–2020)
