= Miami metropolitan area =

Metropolis in the U.S. state of Florida

Miami metropolitan area Miami–Fort Lauderdale–West Palm Beach, FL metropolitan statistical area
- Metropolitan statistical area
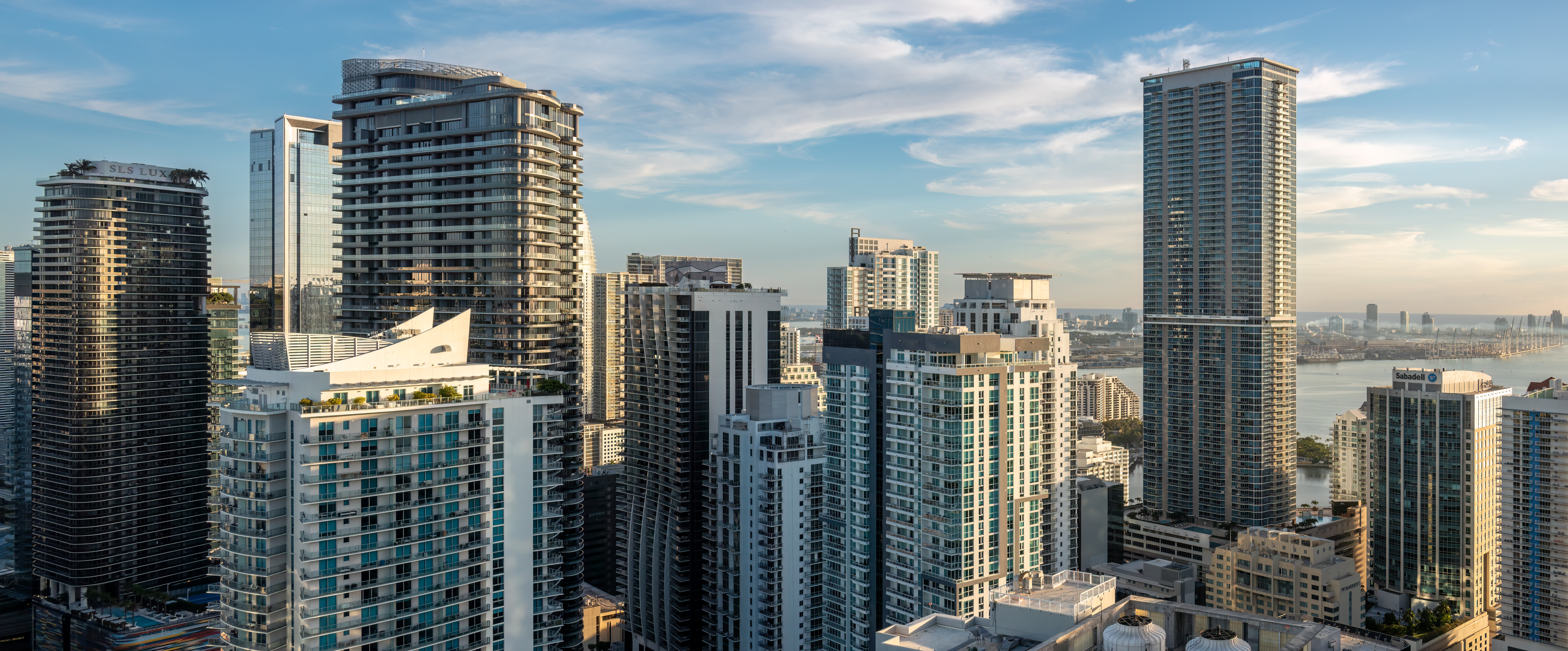
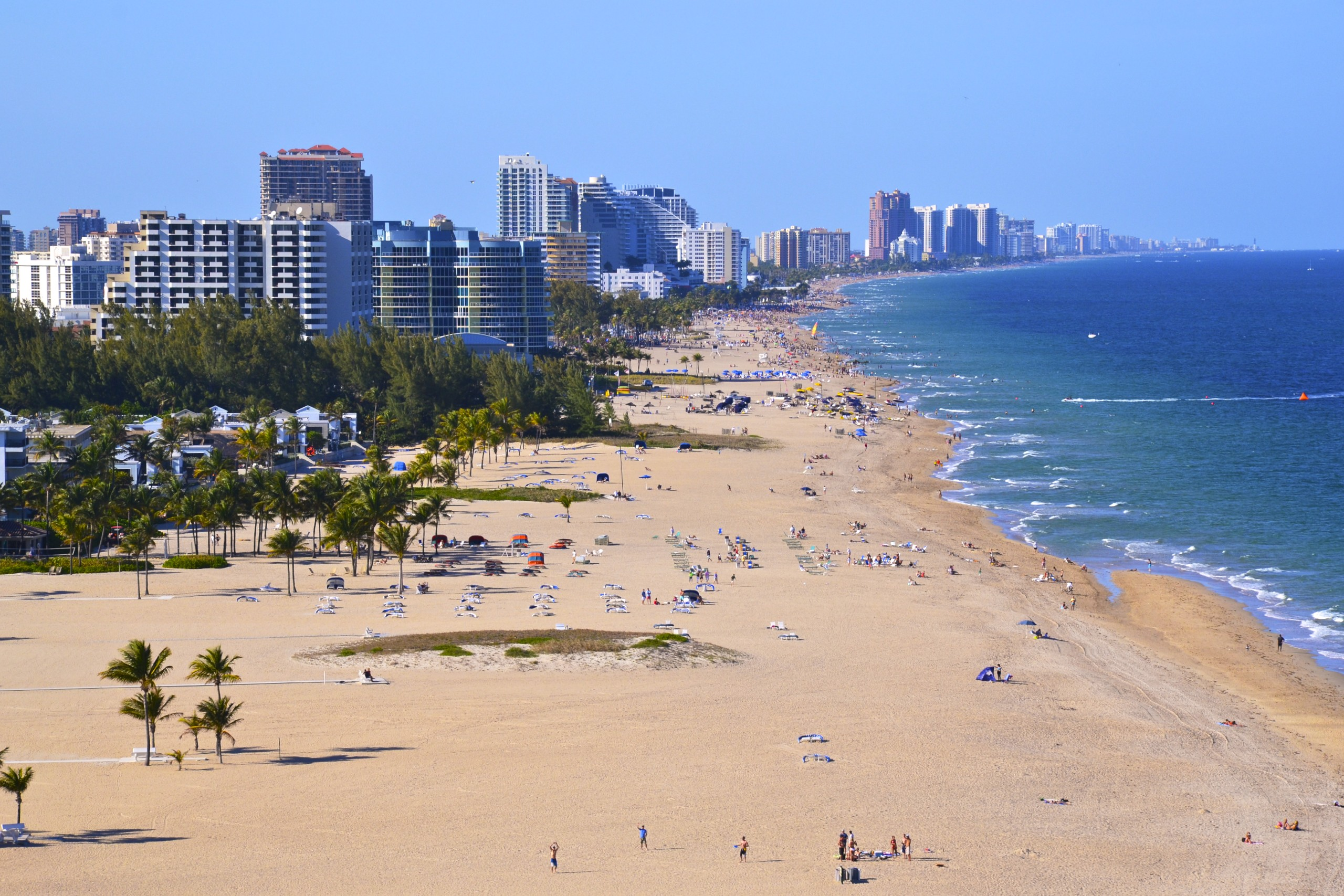
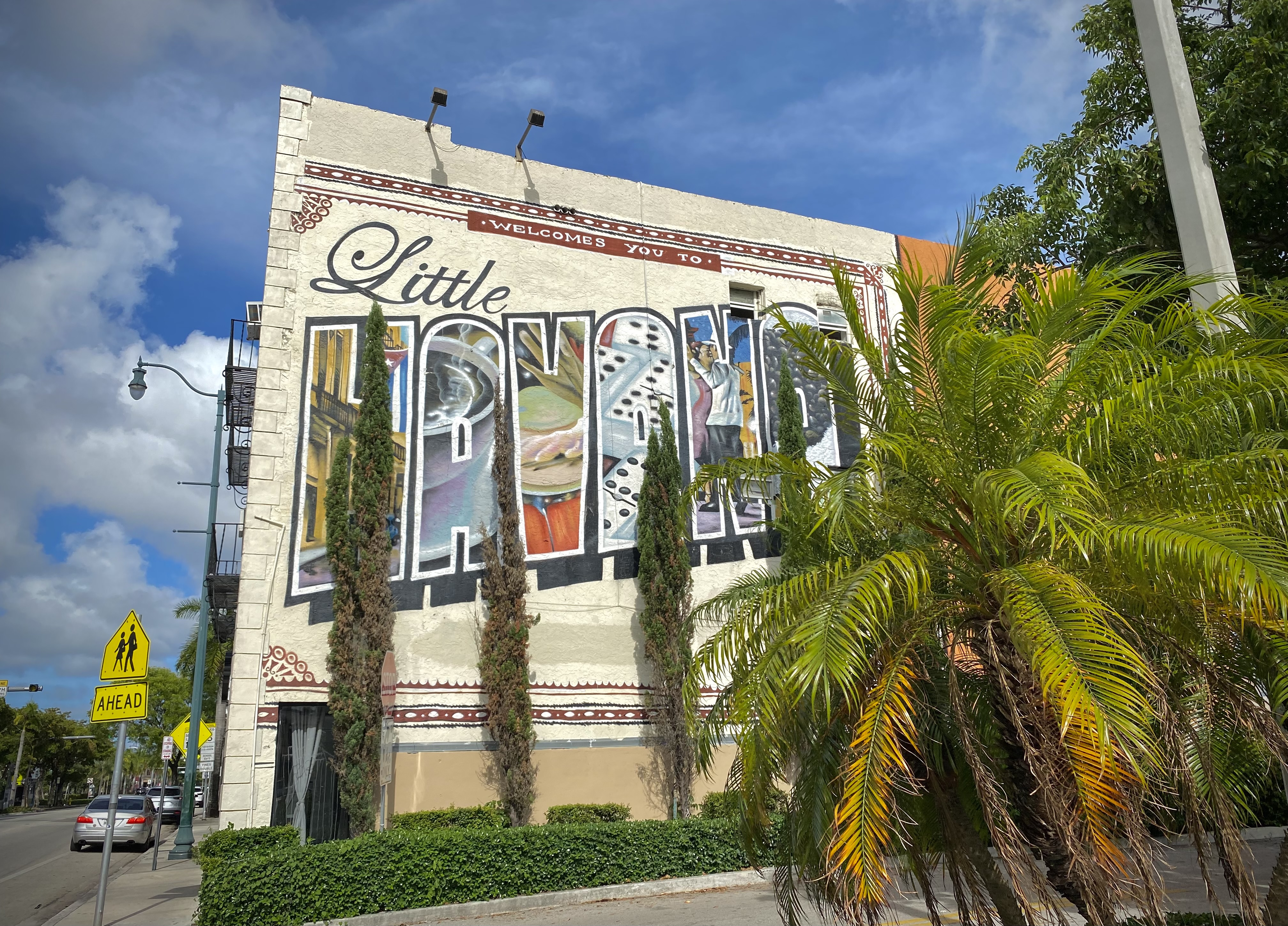
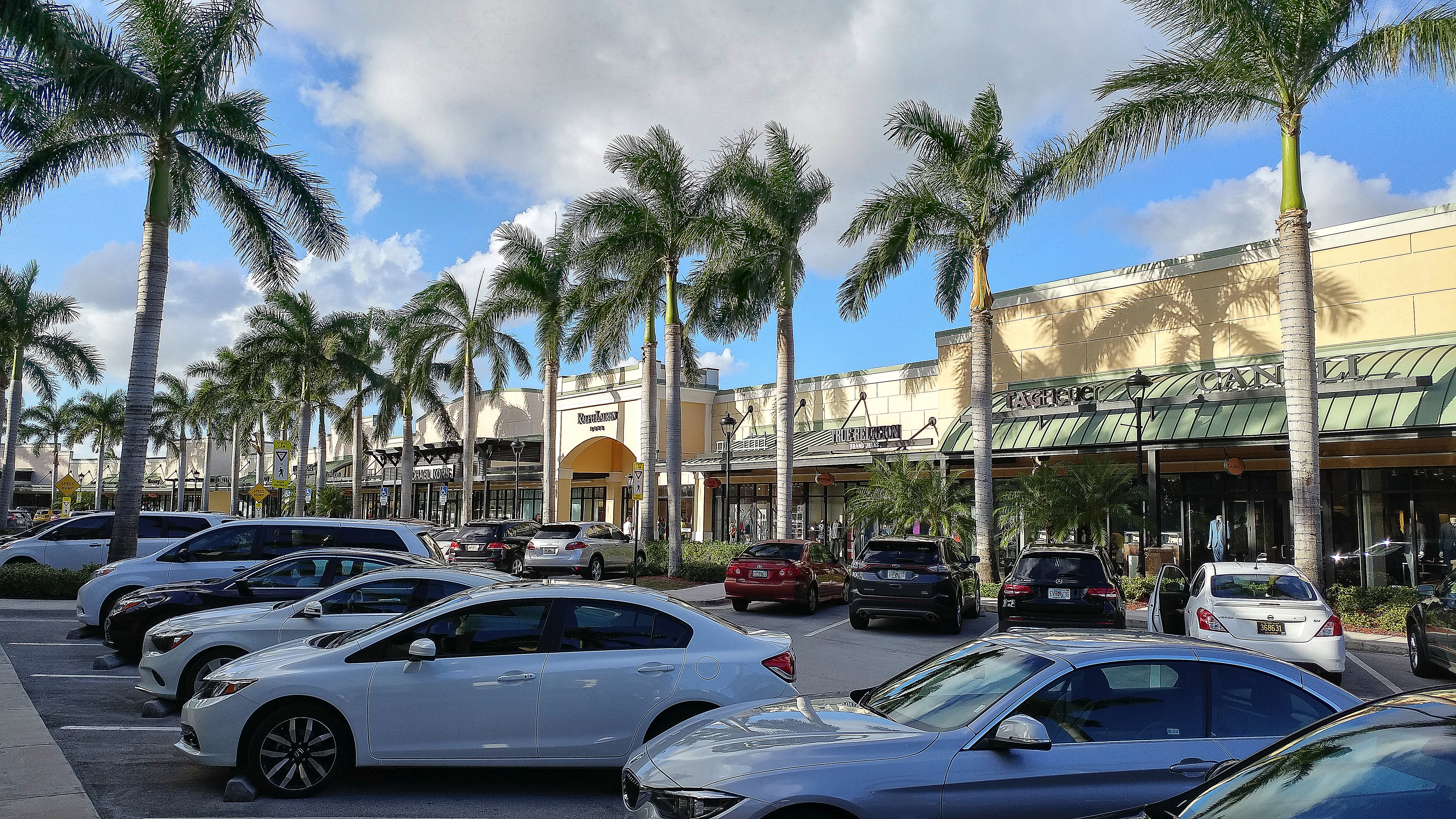
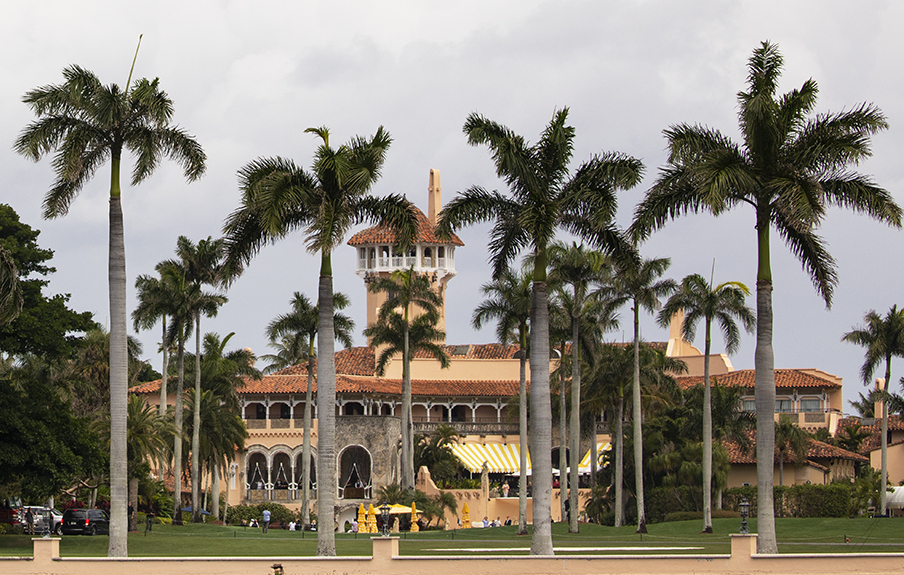
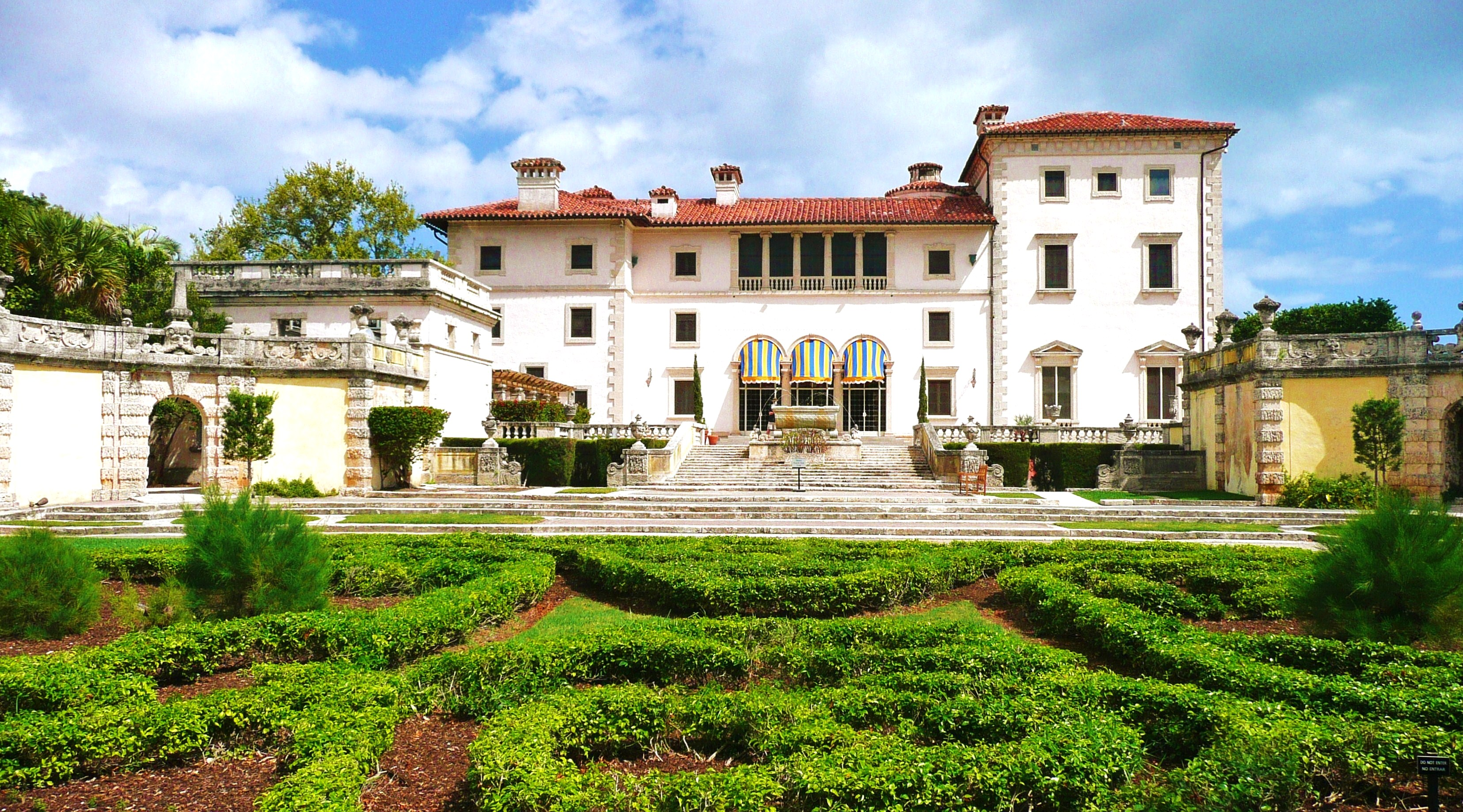
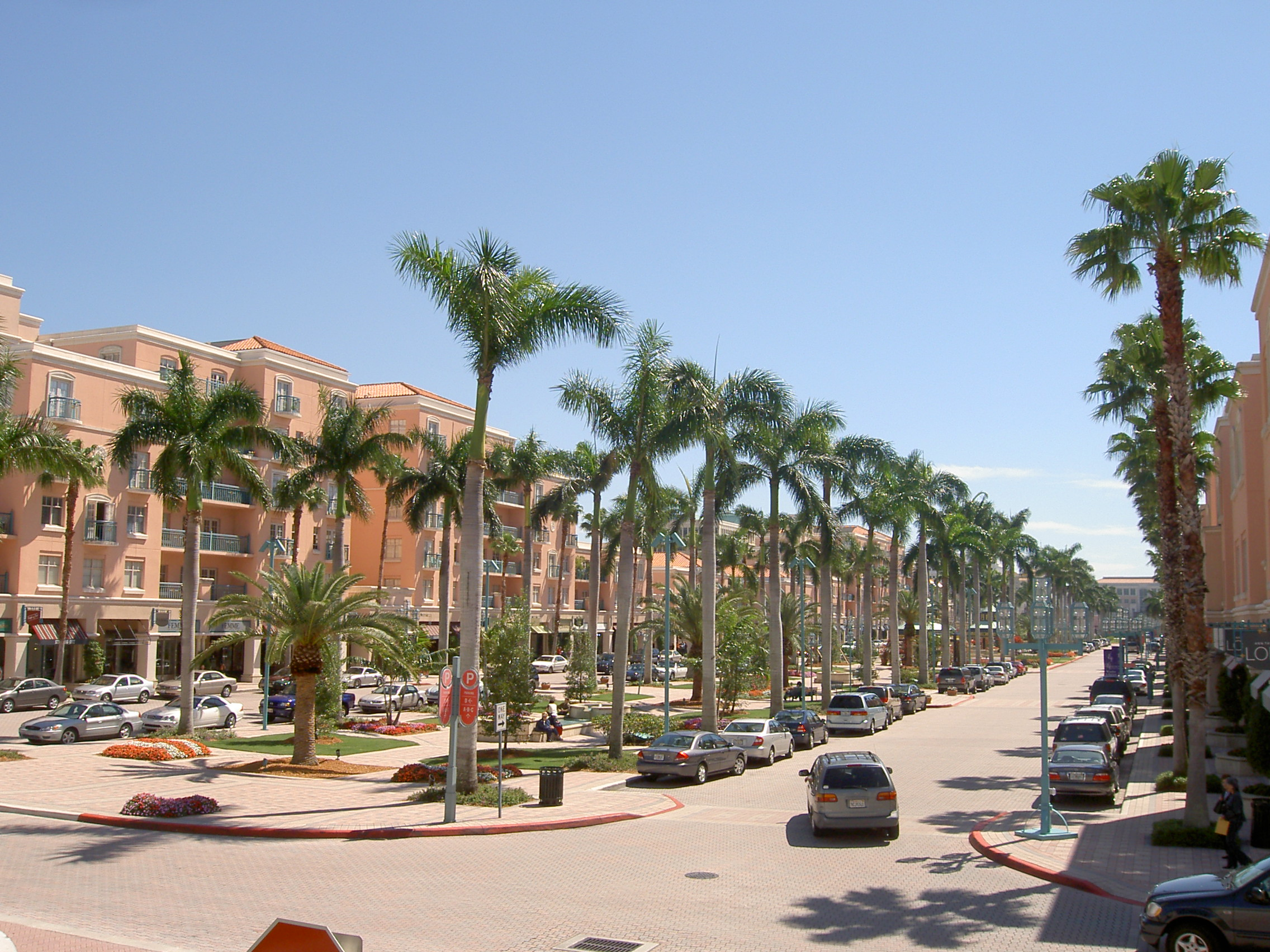
- Skyline of Brickell within Downtown Miami Fort Lauderdale beach along A1A Little Havana Sawgrass Mills Mar-a-Lago Vizcaya Museum and Gardens Mizner Park
Miami-Port Saint Lucie-Fort Lauderdale, FL CSA
City of Miami
City of Fort Lauderdale
City of West Palm Beach
Miami-Fort Lauderdale-West Palm Beach MSA
Port Saint Lucie MSA
Sebastian-Vero Beach-West Vero Corridor MSA
Key West-Key Largo μSA
Okeechobee µSA
- Coordinates: 26°8′N 80°12′W
- Country: United States
- State: Florida
- Core city: Miami
- Principal cities: Fort Lauderdale; West Palm Beach; Pompano Beach; Boca Raton; Sunrise; Lauderhill; Deerfield Beach; Miami Beach; Kendall; Doral; Delray Beach; Jupiter; Palm Beach Gardens; Pembroke Pines

Area
  - Land: 6,137 sq mi (15,890 km^{2})
- Highest elevation: 53 ft (16.2 m)
- Lowest elevation: 0 ft (0 m)

Population (2020)
  - Total: 6,138,333
  - Estimate (2025): 6,391,072
  - Rank: 6th in the United States; 1st in Florida
  - Density: 1,000.7/sq mi (386.37/km^{2})

GDP
  - MSA: $533.674 billion (2023)
- Time zone: UTC−05:00 (Eastern Standard Time)
  - Summer (DST): UTC−04:00 (Eastern Daylight Time)

The Miami metropolitan area, officially the Miami–Fort Lauderdale–West Palm Beach metropolitan statistical area, is the most populous metropolitan area in the U.S. state of Florida, encompassing three main counties in South Florida extending from Palm Beach County in the north to Miami-Dade County in the south, with Broward County in between the two. The city of Miami serves as its core, while Fort Lauderdale and West Palm Beach serve as anchors of their respective counties. The much larger Miami–Port Saint Lucie–Fort Lauderdale combined statistical area (CSA) covers several peripheral counties which include the Treasure Coast region to the north and the Florida Keys to the south. The contiguous urban area is 1,244.18 square miles (3,222.4 km^{2}), whereas the remainder mostly consists of the Everglades and surrounding wetlands. With an estimated population of over 6.3 million, its population exceeds 31 of the nation's 50 states and is the eighth-largest in the country, the fifth-largest in the Southern United States and the second-largest (after Atlanta) in the Southeastern United States. With 1,279.2 mi^{2} (3,313 km^{2}) of urban landmass, the Miami metropolitan area is also one of the world's 100 most populous urbanized areas (ranked 70th by the UN and 80th by the CIA).

Miami is the region's financial and cultural core, with it being the most populous city. According to the Globalization and World Cities Research Network classification, Miami is a "Beta plus" city. The Global Financial Centres Index (GFCI 37) ranked Miami as the world's 26th most important finance center as of May 2025, ranking 7th in the United States. The metropolitan area is by far the largest urban economy in Florida, with a 2023 gross domestic product of $533.674 billion. The Miami area is also sometimes dubbed as the "capital of Latin America" due to its strong cultural ties and large Hispanic and Latino population.

The Miami urban corridor is largely confined to a strip of land between the Atlantic Ocean and Everglades, and Miami's urbanized area is about 100 miles (160 km) long (north to south) and at most 20 miles (32 km) east to west; in some areas, its east to west width is only 5 miles (8 km). The Miami metropolitan statistical area is the second-longest urbanized area in the United States behind the New York metropolitan area. It was the eighth-most densely populated urbanized area in the United States as of the 2000 census.

In the 2020 census, the Miami-Fort Lauderdale urbanized area had a land area of 1,244.18 square miles (3,222.4 km^{2}), with a population of 6,077,522, for a population density of 4,884.78 inhabitants per square mile (1,886.02/km^{2}). The Miami metropolitan area had one urban cluster (UC) in the 2020 census, which is not part of the Miami urbanized area. The Belle Glade urban cluster had a population of 23,009, area of 7.21 square miles (18.7 km^{2}) and population density of 3,191.41 inhabitants per square mile (1,232.21/km^{2}). Miami, the largest city in the metropolitan area, had population density of over 10,000/sq mi (more than 3,800/km^{2}) in 2000. The Miami Urbanized Area was the fourth-largest urbanized area in the United States in the 2010 census.

The most notable colleges and universities in the Miami metropolitan area include Barry University, Florida Atlantic University, Florida International University, Nova Southeastern University, St. Thomas University, and the University of Miami. The region also has three community colleges, Broward College, Miami Dade College, and Palm Beach State College. Some of these institutions, such as Florida International University and Miami Dade College, make up some of the largest institutions of higher learning in the United States.

== Other names ==
The Miami metropolitan area is also known as the South Florida metropolitan area, Miami/Fort Lauderdale metropolitan area, SoFlo, SoFla, the Gold Coast, the Tri-County Area, or Greater Miami, and, for U.S. government statistical purposes, the Miami–Fort Lauderdale–West Palm Beach Metropolitan Statistical Area.

== Definitions ==
=== Miami metropolitan area ===
A satellite image of the Miami metropolitan area in January 2023

As of 2023, the Miami metropolitan area is defined by the U.S. Office of Management and Budget as the Miami-Fort Lauderdale-West Palm Beach Metropolitan Statistical Area (MSA), with a 2020 population of 6,138,333. The MSA is made up of three "metropolitan divisions" :

- Miami-Miami Beach-Kendall Metropolitan Division, coterminous with Miami Dade County (2020 population 2,701,767).
- Fort Lauderdale-Pompano Beach-Sunrise Metropolitan Division, coterminous with Broward County (2020 population 1,944,375).
- West Palm Beach-Boca Raton-Delray Beach Metropolitan Division, coterminous with Palm Beach County (2020 population 1,492,191).

The MSA is the second most populous metropolitan area in the Southeastern United States and has an area of 6,137 sq. mi (15,890 km^{2}).

The original MSA for Miami, as defined by the OMB, included only Dade County (now Miami-Dade County). In 1995, the Miami-Hialeah and Fort Lauderdale-Hollywood-Pompano Beach MSAs had been merged into the Miami-Fort Lauderdale Consolidated MSA, consisting of the Miami Primary MSA (Dade County) and the Fort Lauderdale Primary MSA (Broward County).

In 2003, the West Palm Beach-Boca Raton-Boynton Beach MSA was merged with the consolidated MSA to form the Miami-Fort Lauderdale-Miami Beach Metropolitan Statistical Area, consisting of: the Fort Lauderdale-Pompano Beach-Deerfield Beach Metropolitan Division (Broward County), the Miami-Miami Beach-Kendall Metropolitan Division (Miami-Dade County), and the West Palm Beach-Boca Raton-Boynton Beach Metropolitan Division (Palm Beach County).

=== Miami-Port Saint Lucie-Fort Lauderdale Combined Statistical Area ===
The Census Bureau also defines a wider commercial region based on commuting patterns, the Miami-Port Saint Lucie-Fort Lauderdale Combined Statistical Area (CSA), with a population of 6,887,655 in 2020.

As of 2023, the CSA consists of three component metropolitan statistical areas (MSAs) and two Micropolitan Statistical Areas (μSA):

- The Miami-Fort Lauderdale-West Palm Beach MSA (2020 pop. 6,138,333)
- The Port Saint Lucie MSA (2020 pop. 486,660), consisting of:
  - Martin County (2020 pop. 158,431)p. 28
  - Saint Lucie County (2020 pop. 329,226)p. 28
- The Sebastian-Vero Beach-West Vero Corridor MSA, coterminous with Indian River County (2020 pop. 159,788)
- The Key West-Key Largo μSA, coterminous with Monroe County (2020 pop. 82,874).
- The Okeechobee μSA, coterminous with Okeechobee County.

When the CSA was defined in 2013, it included the Okeechobee μSA, but not the Key West μSA. In 2018 the Okeechobee μSA was removed from the CSA and the Key West μSA was added. The Okeechobee μSA was re-added to the CSA in 2023.

=== Gold Coast ===
The Miami metropolitan area is frequently named the "Gold Coast" in convention with Florida's other coast regions, including the Space Coast, Treasure Coast, Sun Coast, Nature Coast, Forgotten Coast, Emerald Coast, Fun Coast, and First Coast. Like several of the others, it seems to have originated at the time the area first saw major growth. One of the best known of Florida's vernacular regions, the name is a reference to the wealth and ritzy tropical lifestyle that characterizes the area.

== Climate and geography ==
=== Climate ===
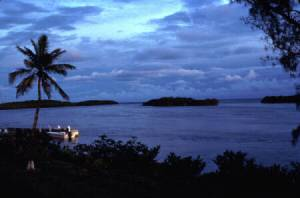
Biscayne National Park in Miami-Dade County

The region has a tropical climate, similar to the climate found in much of the Caribbean. It is the only metropolitan area in the 48 contiguous states that falls under that category. More specifically, it generally has a tropical monsoon climate (Köppen climate classification, Am). The South Florida metropolis sees most of its rain in the summer (wet season) and is quite dry in the winter (dry season). The wet season, which is hot and humid, lasts from May to October, when daily thunderstorms and passing weak tropical lows bring downpours during the late afternoon.The hurricane season largely coincides with the wet season.

The dry season often starts in late October and runs to late April. During the height of the dry season from February to April, South Florida is often very dry, and brush fires and water restrictions are often an issue. At times cold fronts can make it all the way down to South Florida and provide some modest rainfall in the dry season.

In addition to its sea-level elevation, coastal location and position near the Tropic of Cancer and the Caribbean, the area owes its warm, humid climate to the Gulf Stream, which moderates climate year-round. A typical summer day does not see temperatures below 75 °F (24 °C). Temperatures in the high 80s to low 90s (30–35 °C) accompanied by high humidity are often relieved by afternoon thunderstorms or a sea breeze that develops off the Atlantic Ocean, which then allow lower temperatures, although conditions still remain very muggy.

During winter, dry air often dominates as dew points are often very low. Average daily high temperatures across South Florida during the winter are around 74–77 °F (23–25 °C). Although daily highs can sometimes reach 82–85 °F (28–29 °C) even in January and February. Daily low temperatures during the winter are generally around 55–63 °F (13–17 °C). Each winter, cold fronts occasionally make their way down to the northern Bahamas and South Florida. As a result, daytime high temperatures in South Florida may only reach around 65 °F (18 °C) or cooler.

When this occurs, low temperatures can dip into the 40s during the early morning hours before quickly warming-up toward late morning/early afternoon. It is rare for temperatures to drop below 40 °F (4 °C), however, low temperatures at or around 35 °F (2 °C) have occurred some years. South Florida only experiences these cold spells about twice each winter and they typically only last a day or two before temperatures return to the mid 70s. On average South Florida is frost-free, although there can be a light frost in the inland communities about once every decade.

Hurricane season officially runs from June 1 to November 30, although hurricanes can develop outside that period. The most likely time for South Florida to be hit is during the peak of the Cape Verde season, mid-August to the end of September. Due to its location between two major bodies of water known for tropical activity, South Florida is statistically the most likely major area to be struck by a hurricane in the world, trailed closely by Nassau, Bahamas, and Havana, Cuba. Many hurricanes have affected Miami, including Betsy in 1965, Andrew in 1992, Irene in 1999, Hurricanes Katrina and Wilma in 2005, and Irma in 2017. In addition, a tropical depression in October 2000 passed over the city, causing record rainfall and flooding. Locally, the storm is credited as the No Name Storm of 2000, though the depression went on to become Tropical Storm Leslie upon entering the Atlantic Ocean.

Climate data for West Palm Beach Airport, Florida (1981–2010 normals, extremes 1888–present)
Month	Jan	Feb	Mar	Apr	May	Jun	Jul	Aug	Sep	Oct	Nov	Dec	Year
Mean daily maximum °F (°C)	75.2 (24.0)	76.3 (24.6)	80.0 (26.7)	84.1 (28.9)	87.0 (30.6)	90.7 (32.6)	92.0 (33.3)	91.3 (32.9)	88.3 (31.3)	84.3 (29.1)	82.3 (27.9)	76.7 (24.8)	84.3 (29.1)
Mean daily minimum °F (°C)	57.4 (14.1)	58.6 (14.8)	61.7 (16.5)	65.0 (18.3)	71.1 (21.7)	75.0 (23.9)	75.2 (24.0)	75.4 (24.1)	74.3 (23.5)	70.9 (21.6)	63.4 (17.4)	60.0 (15.6)	66.8 (19.3)
Average rainfall inches (mm)	2.18 (55)	2.09 (53)	2.05 (52)	2.03 (52)	5.76 (146)	9.02 (229)	9.27 (235)	9.83 (250)	9.93 (252)	9.57 (243)	5.07 (129)	2.27 (58)	60.35 (1,533)
Average rainy days (≥ 0.01 in)	7.8	6.7	5.0	5.8	14.1	16.0	18.1	19.0	16.7	17.1	10.2	7.1	132.6
Source: NOAA

Climate data for Fort Lauderdale Int'l Airport, Florida (1981–2010 normals, extremes 1912–present)
Month	Jan	Feb	Mar	Apr	May	Jun	Jul	Aug	Sep	Oct	Nov	Dec	Year
Mean daily maximum °F (°C)	75.5 (24.2)	76.7 (24.8)	78.5 (25.8)	82.9 (28.3)	85.6 (29.8)	89.8 (32.1)	91.9 (33.3)	90.5 (32.5)	88.8 (31.6)	85.8 (29.9)	81.0 (27.2)	76.9 (24.9)	83.3 (28.5)
Mean daily minimum °F (°C)	59.0 (15.0)	60.5 (15.8)	63.4 (17.4)	66.9 (19.4)	72.0 (22.2)	74.4 (23.6)	75.9 (24.4)	75.8 (24.3)	75.2 (24.0)	71.8 (22.1)	65.7 (18.7)	61.3 (16.3)	67.7 (19.8)
Average rainfall inches (mm)	3.63 (92)	2.96 (75)	3.36 (85)	2.89 (73)	4.65 (118)	10.16 (258)	5.98 (152)	7.44 (189)	8.59 (218)	6.82 (173)	3.24 (82)	2.46 (62)	62.18 (1,579)
Average rainy days (≥ 0.01 in)	5.0	6.1	6.9	5.4	8.8	15.9	15.9	15.7	15.8	10.6	8.1	8.1	122.3

Climate data for Miami International Airport, 1991−2020 normals, (Note: Mean monthly maxima and minima (i.e. the highest and lowest temperature readings during an entire month or year) calculated based on data at said location from 1991 to 2020.) extremes 1895−present (Note: Official records for Miami were kept at the Lemon City from September 1895 to November 1900, the Miami COOP from December 1900 to May 1911, the Weather Bureau Office in present-day Downtown Miami from June 1911 to February 1937, the old Miami Municipal Airport in present-day Hialeah from March 1937 to July 1942, and at Miami Int'l since August 1942. For more information, see ThreadEx and the National Weather Service's overview.)
Month	Jan	Feb	Mar	Apr	May	Jun	Jul	Aug	Sep	Oct	Nov	Dec	Year
Record high °F (°C)	88 (31)	89 (32)	93 (34)	97 (36)	98 (37)	98 (37)	100 (38)	100 (38)	97 (36)	95 (35)	91 (33)	89 (32)	100 (38)
Mean maximum °F (°C)	84.4 (29.1)	85.8 (29.9)	89.0 (31.7)	90.7 (32.6)	92.8 (33.8)	94.2 (34.6)	94.7 (34.8)	94.5 (34.7)	93.2 (34.0)	90.9 (32.7)	87.0 (30.6)	84.9 (29.4)	95.8 (35.4)
Mean daily maximum °F (°C)	76.2 (24.6)	78.2 (25.7)	80.6 (27.0)	83.6 (28.7)	86.7 (30.4)	89.3 (31.8)	90.6 (32.6)	90.7 (32.6)	89.0 (31.7)	85.9 (29.9)	81.3 (27.4)	78.2 (25.7)	84.2 (29.0)
Daily mean °F (°C)	68.6 (20.3)	70.7 (21.5)	73.1 (22.8)	76.7 (24.8)	80.1 (26.7)	82.8 (28.2)	84.1 (28.9)	84.2 (29.0)	83.0 (28.3)	80.1 (26.7)	74.8 (23.8)	71.2 (21.8)	77.4 (25.2)
Mean daily minimum °F (°C)	61.0 (16.1)	63.2 (17.3)	65.6 (18.7)	69.8 (21.0)	73.4 (23.0)	76.3 (24.6)	77.5 (25.3)	77.7 (25.4)	76.9 (24.9)	74.2 (23.4)	68.3 (20.2)	64.3 (17.9)	70.7 (21.5)
Mean minimum °F (°C)	45.1 (7.3)	48.5 (9.2)	52.3 (11.3)	59.6 (15.3)	66.7 (19.3)	71.5 (21.9)	72.5 (22.5)	72.8 (22.7)	72.7 (22.6)	65.0 (18.3)	55.7 (13.2)	49.7 (9.8)	42.5 (5.8)
Record low °F (°C)	28 (−2)	27 (−3)	32 (0)	39 (4)	50 (10)	60 (16)	66 (19)	67 (19)	62 (17)	45 (7)	36 (2)	30 (−1)	27 (−3)
Average precipitation inches (mm)	1.83 (46)	2.15 (55)	2.46 (62)	3.36 (85)	6.32 (161)	10.51 (267)	7.36 (187)	9.58 (243)	10.22 (260)	7.65 (194)	3.53 (90)	2.44 (62)	67.41 (1,712)
Average precipitation days (≥ 0.01 in)	7.7	6.5	6.3	6.9	10.8	17.6	17.3	19.4	18.1	13.8	8.6	8.0	141.0
Average relative humidity (%)	72.7	70.9	69.5	67.3	71.6	76.2	74.8	76.2	77.8	74.9	73.8	72.5	73.2
Average dew point °F (°C)	57.6 (14.2)	57.6 (14.2)	60.4 (15.8)	62.6 (17.0)	67.6 (19.8)	72.0 (22.2)	73.0 (22.8)	73.8 (23.2)	73.2 (22.9)	68.7 (20.4)	63.9 (17.7)	59.2 (15.1)	65.8 (18.8)
Mean monthly sunshine hours	219.8	216.9	277.2	293.8	301.3	288.7	308.7	288.3	262.2	260.2	220.8	216.1	3,154
Percentage possible sunshine	66	69	75	77	72	70	73	71	71	73	68	66	71
Average ultraviolet index	5.1	6.7	8.6	10.2	10.5	10.7	10.8	10.5	9.3	7.1	5.3	4.5	8.2
Source 1: NOAA (relative humidity, dew point and sun 1961–1990), The Weather Channel
Source 2: UV Index Today (1995 to 2022), Thunderstorm days (1961 to 1990)

Climate data for Miami Beach, 1981−2010 normals
Month	Jan	Feb	Mar	Apr	May	Jun	Jul	Aug	Sep	Oct	Nov	Dec	Year
Mean daily maximum °F (°C)	73.8 (23.2)	74.9 (23.8)	76.3 (24.6)	79.4 (26.3)	82.8 (28.2)	86.5 (30.3)	88.1 (31.2)	88.5 (31.4)	87.0 (30.6)	83.7 (28.7)	79.3 (26.3)	75.7 (24.3)	81.3 (27.4)
Mean daily minimum °F (°C)	61.4 (16.3)	63.0 (17.2)	65.3 (18.5)	69.2 (20.7)	73.9 (23.3)	77.0 (25.0)	78.3 (25.7)	78.6 (25.9)	77.7 (25.4)	74.7 (23.7)	69.5 (20.8)	64.3 (17.9)	71.1 (21.7)
Average rainfall inches (mm)	2.09 (53)	2.33 (59)	3.00 (76)	3.20 (81)	4.98 (126)	8.27 (210)	4.35 (110)	6.37 (162)	7.88 (200)	4.47 (114)	2.74 (70)	2.05 (52)	51.73 (1,313)
Average rainy days (≥ 0.01 in)	6.7	6.0	6.9	6.0	8.9	14.5	12.1	14.0	14.9	11.2	8.1	6.9	116.2
Source: NOAA (extremes 1927−present)

== Component counties, subregions, and cities ==
=== Largest cities ===
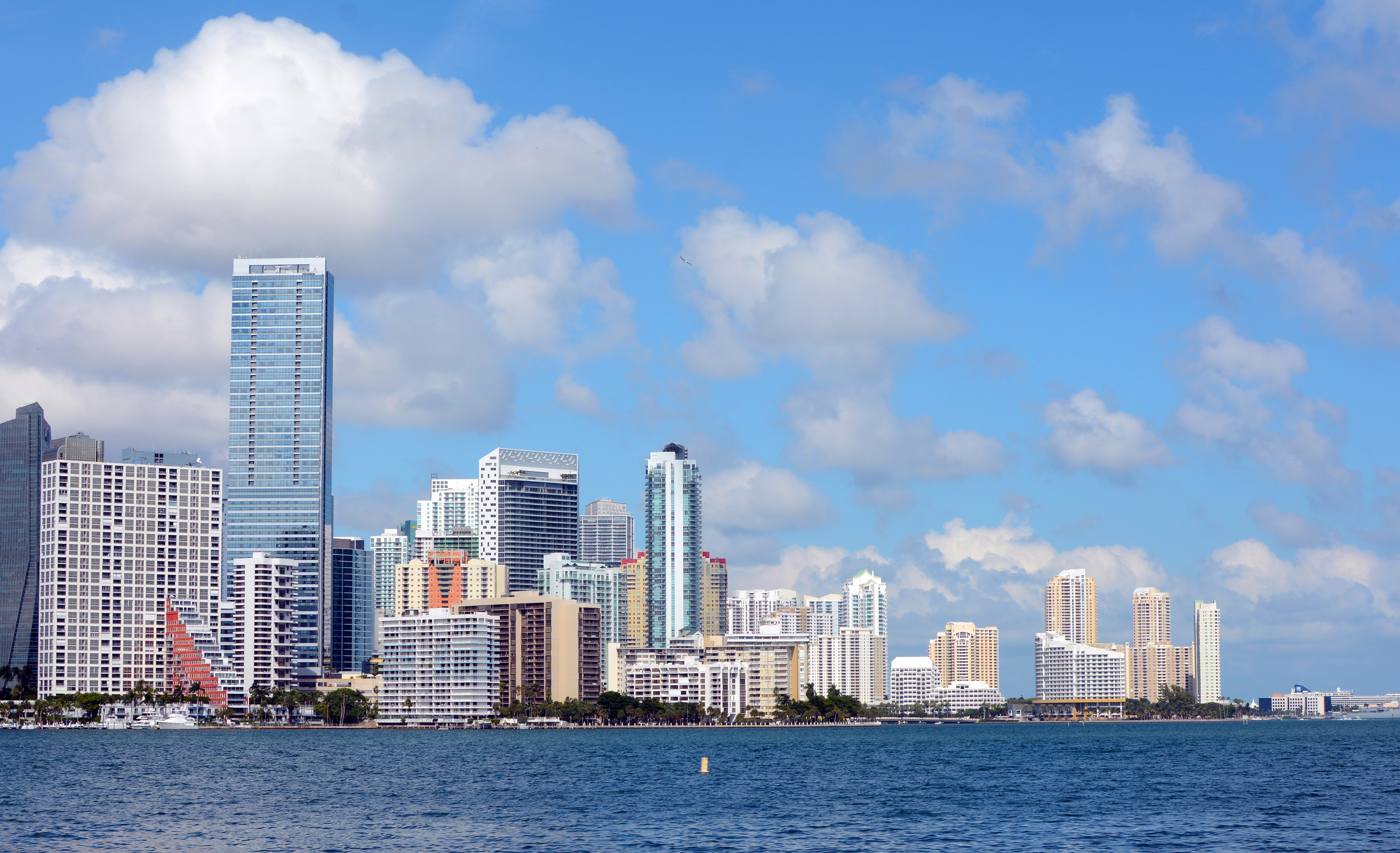
Downtown Miami in November 2014

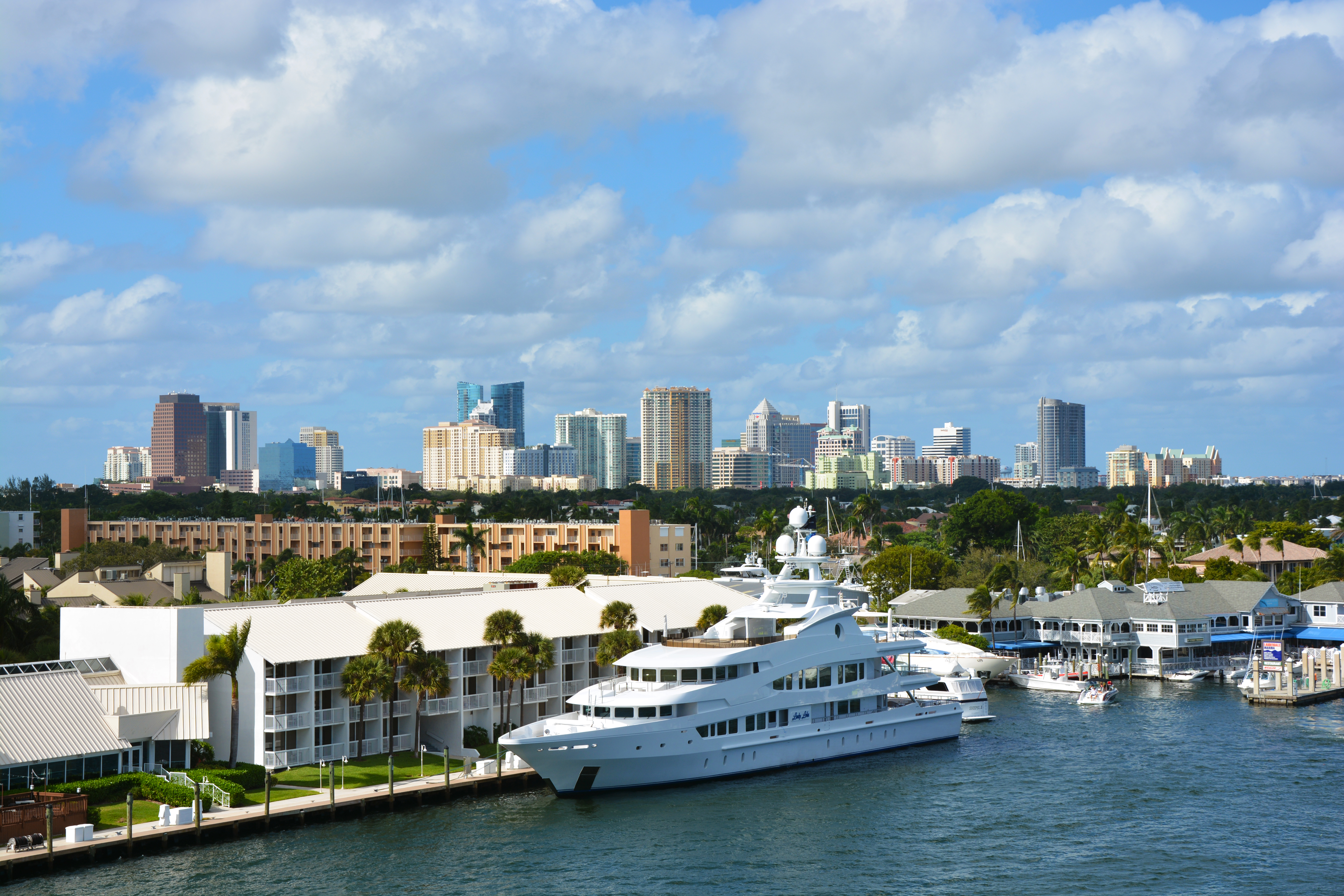
Fort Lauderdale in November 2015

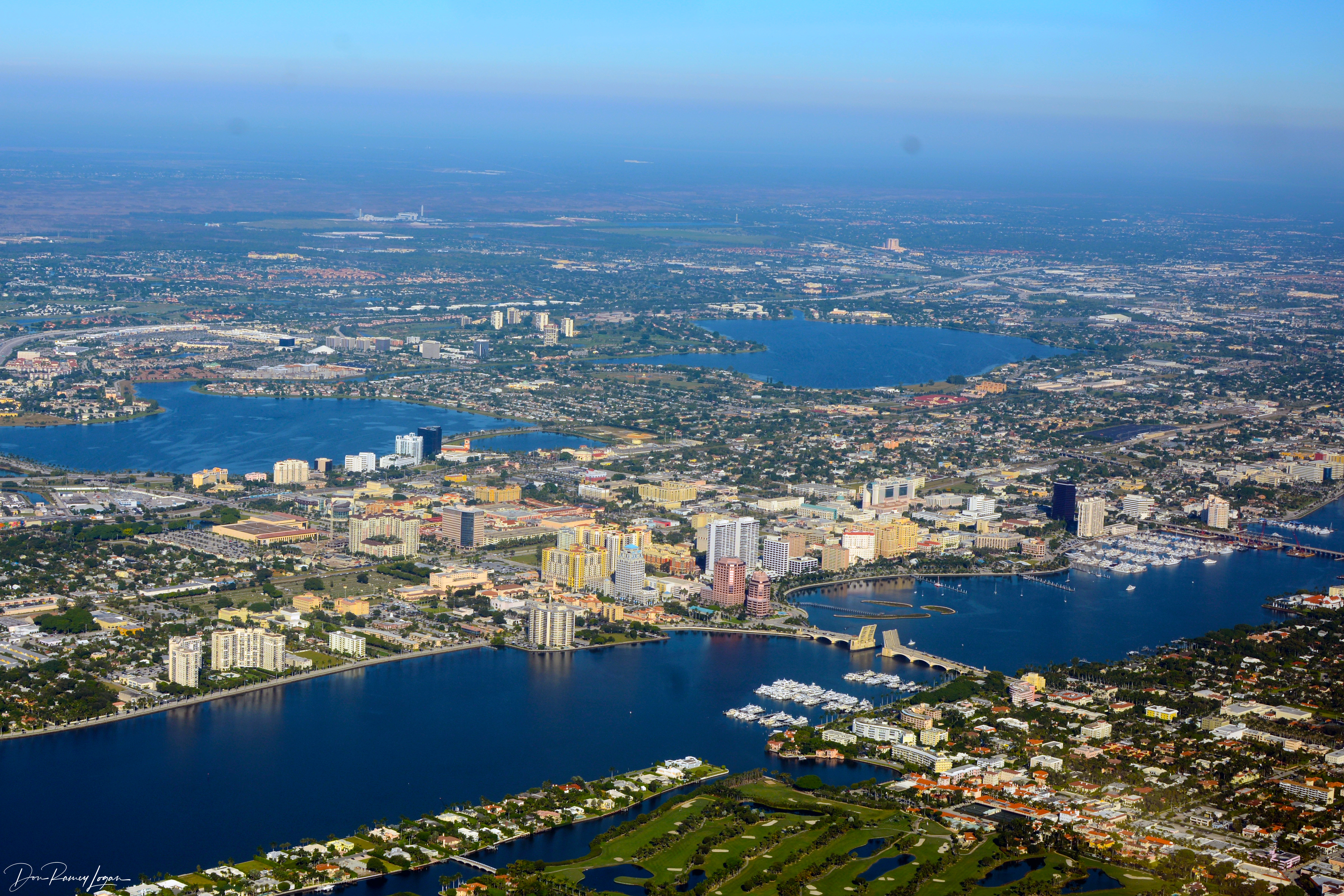
West Palm Beach in November 2014

The following is a list of the twenty largest cities in the Miami metropolitan area as ranked by population.

City	County	2000 population	2010 population	2020 population	2010 to 2020 % change
Miami	Miami-Dade	362,470	399,457	442,241	+10.71%
Hialeah	Miami-Dade	226,419	224,669	223,109	−0.69%
Fort Lauderdale	Broward	152,397	165,521	182,760	+10.41%
Pembroke Pines	Broward	137,427	154,750	171,178	+10.62%
Hollywood	Broward	139,357	140,768	153,067	+8.74%
Miramar	Broward	72,739	122,041	134,721	+10.39%
Coral Springs	Broward	117,549	121,096	133,394	+10.16%
Miami Gardens	Miami-Dade	100,758	107,167	111,640	+4.17%
Pompano Beach	Broward	78,191	99,845	112,046	+12.22%
West Palm Beach	Palm Beach	82,103	99,919	117,415	+17.51%
Davie	Broward	75,720	91,922	105,691	+14.98%
Boca Raton	Palm Beach	74,764	84,392	97,422	+15.44%
Sunrise	Broward	85,779	84,439	97,335	+15.27%
Plantation	Broward	82,934	84,955	91,750	+8.00%
Miami Beach	Miami-Dade	87,933	87,779	82,890	−5.57%
Deerfield Beach	Broward	64,583	75,018	86,859	+15.78%
Boynton Beach	Palm Beach	60,389	68,217	80,380	+17.83%
Lauderhill	Broward	57,585	66,887	74,482	+11.35%
Doral	Miami-Dade	20,438	45,704	75,874	+66.01%
Homestead	Miami-Dade	31,909	60,512	80,737	+33.42%

=== Areas with between 10,000 and 100,000 inhabitants ===
- Aventura
- Belle Glade
- Boca Del Mar
- Boca Raton
- Boynton Beach
- Brownsville
- Coconut Creek
- Cooper City
- Coral Gables
- Coral Terrace
- Country Club
- Country Walk
- Cutler Bay
- Dania Beach
- Deerfield Beach
- Delray Beach
- Doral
- Florida City
- Fontainebleau
- Gladeview
- Glenvar Heights
- Goulds
- Greenacres
- Hallandale Beach
- Hamptons at Boca Raton
- Hialeah Gardens
- Homestead
- Ives Estates
- Jupiter
- Kendale Lakes
- Kendall West
- Kendall
- Key Biscayne
- Kings Point
- Lake Worth Corridor
- Lake Worth Beach
- Lauderdale Lakes
- Lauderhill
- Leisure City
- Lighthouse Point
- Margate
- Miami Beach
- Miami Lakes
- Miami Shores
- Miami Springs
- North Lauderdale
- North Miami Beach
- North Miami
- North Palm Beach
- Oakland Park
- Ojus
- Olympia Heights
- Opa-locka
- Palm Beach Gardens
- Palm Beach
- Palm Springs
- Palmetto Bay
- Palmetto Estates
- Parkland
- Pinecrest
- Pinewood
- Plantation
- Princeton
- Richmond West
- Riviera Beach
- Royal Palm Beach
- Sandalfoot Cove
- South Miami Heights
- South Miami
- Sunny Isles Beach
- Sunrise
- Sunset
- Sweetwater
- Tamarac
- Tamiami
- The Crossings
- The Hammocks
- University Park
- Wellington
- West Little River
- West Park
- Westchester
- Weston
- Westwood Lakes
- Wilton Manors

=== Areas with fewer than 10,000 inhabitants ===
- Atlantis
- Bal Harbour
- Bay Harbor Islands
- Belle Glade Camp
- Biscayne Park
- Boca Pointe
- Boulevard Gardens
- Briny Breezes
- Broadview Park
- Canal Point
- Century Village
- Cypress Lakes
- Dunes Road
- El Portal
- Fisher Island
- Franklin Park
- Fremd Village-Padgett Island
- Glen Ridge
- Godfrey Road
- Golden Beach
- Golden Lakes
- Golf
- Gulf Stream
- Gun Club Estates
- Haverhill
- High Point
- Highland Beach
- Hillsboro Beach
- Hillsboro Pines
- Homestead Base
- Hypoluxo
- Indian Creek
- Islandia
- Juno Beach
- Juno Ridge
- Jupiter Inlet Colony
- Lake Belvedere Estates
- Lake Clarke Shores
- Lake Harbor
- Lake Park
- Lakeside Green
- Lantana
- Lauderdale-by-the-Sea
- Lazy Lake
- Limestone Creek
- Manalapan
- Mangonia Park
- Medley
- Mission Bay
- Naranja
- North Bay Village
- Ocean Ridge
- Pahokee
- Palm Beach Shores
- Palm Springs North
- Pembroke Park
- Plantation Mobile Home Park
- Richmond Heights
- Roosevelt Gardens
- Royal Palm Estates
- Schall Circle
- Sea Ranch Lakes
- Seminole Manor
- South Bay
- South Palm Beach
- Southwest Ranches
- Stacy Street
- Surfside
- Tequesta
- Three Lakes
- Villages of Oriole
- Virginia Gardens
- Washington Park
- Westlake
- West Miami
- West Perrine
- Westview
- Whisper Walk

== Demographics ==
Miami MSA (Miami-Dade, Broward, and Palm Beach)
Census	Pop.	Note	%±
1920	66,542		—
1930	214,830		222.8%
1940	387,522		80.4%
1950	693,705		79.0%
1960	1,497,099		115.8%
1970	2,236,885		49.4%
1980	3,220,844		44.0%
1990	4,056,100		25.9%
2000	5,007,564		23.5%
2010	5,564,635		11.1%
2020	6,138,333		10.3%
2025 (est.)	6,391,072		4.1%
U.S. Decennial Census; 1920–1970 1980 1990; 2000 2010 2020 2023

Historical racial composition	2020	2010	2000	1990	1980
White (non-Hispanic)	29.1%	34.8%	44.1%	54.5%	64.6%
Hispanic or Latino	45.9%	41.6%	34.0%	27.8%	20.2%
Black or African American (non-Hispanic)	18.7%	19.7%	18.1%	16.3%	14.2%
Asian and Pacific Islander (non-Hispanic)	2.6%	2.2%	1.7%	1.2%	1.1%
Native American (non-Hispanic)	0.1%	0.1%	0.1%	0.1%	1.1%
Other Race (non-Hispanic)	0.8%	0.3%	0.3%	0.1%	1.1%
Two or more races (non-Hispanic)	2.8%	1.2%	1.8%	N/A	N/A
Population	6,138,333	5,564,635	5,007,564	4,056,100	3,220,844

Demographic characteristics	2020	2010	2000	1990	1980
Households	2,641,002	2,464,417	2,149,749	1,586,355	1,261,686
Persons per household	2.32	2.26	2.33	2.56	2.55
Sex Ratio	92.8	93.8	93.4	92.1	90.1
Ages 0–17	19.6%	21.7%	23.6%	22.0%	22.6%
Ages 18–64	61.5%	62.4%	59.9%	59.7%	59.3%
Ages 65 +	18.9%	15.9%	16.4%	18.3%	18.1%
Median age	42.2	39.9	37.7	36.4	36.9
Population	6,138,333	5,564,635	5,007,564	4,056,100	3,220,844

A map of population density in the Miami urban area in 2020

Economic indicators
2017–21 American Community Survey	Miami metro area	Florida
Median income	$34,644	$34,367
Median household income	$62,855	$61,777
Poverty Rate	13.6%	13.1%
High school diploma	86.5%	89.0%
Bachelor's degree	34.1%	31.5%
Advanced degree	13.0%	11.7%

Language spoken at home (Note: Language spoken at home among residents at least five years old; only languages (or language groups) which at least 2% of residents have spoken at any time since 1980 are mentioned)	2015 (Note: Refers to 2013–2017 American Community Survey data; the last Decennial Census where language data was collected was in the 2000 census)	2010 (Note: Refers to 2008–2012 American Community Survey data; the last Decennial Census where language data was collected was in the 2000 census)	2000	1990	1980
English	46.9%	49.2%	55.3%	64.0%	72.9%
Spanish or Spanish Creole	41.6%	39.7%	34.6%	27.8%	20.2%
French or Haitian Creole	5.9%	5.8%	4.9%	3.0%	1.3%
Other Languages	5.5%	5.3%	5.3%	5.1%	5.7%

Nativity	2015 (Note: Refers to 2013–2017 American Community Survey data; the last Decennial Census where foreign-born population data was collected was in the 2000 census)	2010 (Note: Refers to 2008–2012 American Community Survey data; the last Decennial Census where foreign-born population data was collected was in the 2000 census)	2000	1990	1980
% population native-born	60.0%	61.8%	65.0%	71.0%	76.7%
... born in the United States	57.0%	59.1%	62.3%	68.4%	75.0%
... born in Puerto Rico or Island Areas	1.8%	1.7%	1.9%	2.2%	1.8%
... born to American parents abroad	1.2%	1.1%	0.8%	0.9%	1.8%
% population foreign-born (Note: Only countries of birth which at least 0.2% of residents were born in at any time since 1980 are mentioned)	40.0%	38.2%	35.0%	29.0%	23.3%
... born in Cuba	13.0%	12.0%	11.5%	11.3%	10.6%
... born in Haiti	3.7%	3.5%	2.9%	1.8%	N/A (Note: Not counted separately; aggregated into "Other" category)
... born in Colombia	2.9%	2.8%	2.5%	1.4%	N/A
... born in Jamaica	2.3%	2.3%	2.1%	1.4%	0.7%
... born in Venezuela	1.6%	1.2%	0.7%	0.3%	N/A
... born in Nicaragua	1.5%	1.7%	1.8%	1.7%	N/A
... born in the Dominican Republic	1.2%	1.1%	1.0%	0.5%	0.2%
... born in Mexico	1.1%	1.1%	1.0%	0.5%	0.2%
... born in Honduras	1.1%	1.1%	0.9%	0.4%	N/A
... born in Peru	1.1%	1.1%	0.9%	0.5%	N/A
... born in Brazil	0.8%	0.7%	0.6%	0.2%	N/A
... born in Guatemala	0.7%	0.7%	0.4%	0.2%	N/A
... born in Argentina	0.7%	0.6%	0.5%	0.3%	N/A
... born in Canada	0.6%	0.6%	0.7%	0.7%	0.9%
... born in Ecuador	0.5%	0.5%	0.4%	0.2%	N/A
... born in El Salvador	0.5%	0.5%	0.4%	0.2%	N/A
... born in India	0.4%	0.3%	0.2%	0.1%	0.1%
... born in Trinidad and Tobago	0.4%	0.4%	0.4%	0.2%	N/A
... born in the United Kingdom	0.3%	0.3%	0.4%	0.5%	0.6%
... born in China	0.3%	0.2%	0.1%	0.1%	0.1%
... born in the Philippines	0.3%	0.2%	0.2%	0.1%	0.1%
... born in Italy	0.2%	0.2%	0.3%	0.3%	0.5%
... born in Chile	0.2%	0.2%	0.3%	0.2%	N/A
... born in the Bahamas	0.2%	0.2%	N/A	0.3%	N/A
... born in Spain	0.2%	0.2%	0.2%	0.3%	N/A
... born in Germany	0.2%	0.2%	0.4%	0.5%	0.6%
... born in Panama	0.2%	0.2%	0.2%	0.2%	N/A
... born in Russia	0.2%	0.1%	0.2%	0.3% (Note: Data from the 1980 census and 1990 census pertains to residents born anywhere in the Soviet Union, not just Russia)	0.9%
... born in Poland	0.1%	0.2%	0.3%	0.5%	0.7%
... born in Hungary	0.1%	0.1%	0.1%	0.1%	0.2%
... born in Austria	< 0.1%	< 0.1%	0.1%	0.1%	0.2%
... born in other countries	3.4%	3.7%	3.3%	3.6%	6.7%

There is a strong divide between the northern and southern parts of the region in terms of dominant language. In 2010, English was the household language of 73.1% of Palm Beach County residents and 63.4% of Broward County residents but only 28.1% of Miami-Dade County residents. In contrast, 63.8% of Miami-Dade County residents spoke Spanish at home.

=== Religion ===
Religion in the Miami metropolitan area (2014)
1. Protestantism (39.0%)
2. Roman Catholicism (27.0%)
3. Mormonism (0.50%)
4. Eastern Orthodoxy (0.50%)
5. Jehovah's Witnesses (1.00%)
6. Other Christian (1.00%)
7. No religion (21.0%)
8. Judaism (9.00%)
9. Other religion (1.00%)

In a 2014 study by the Pew Research Center, Christianity is the most prevalent religion in the Miami metropolitan area (68%), with 39% professing attendance at a variety of churches that could be considered Protestant and 27% professing Roman Catholic beliefs. Judaism is second (9%), followed by Islam, Buddhism, Hinduism and a variety of other religions have smaller followings; 21% of the population did not identify with any religion.

The Miami area has one of the largest Jewish communities in the United States. 10.2% of the population identified as Jewish in the 2000 Census. In a 2011 survey of American Judaism, Palm Beach County had the most Jews of any Florida county both in absolute numbers (205,850) and as a percentage of the overall population (15.8%). Broward County came in second place with 170,700 Jewish residents or 9.8% of the population, and Miami-Dade County came in third with 106,300 or 4.3%.

=== Housing ===
Changes in house prices for the area are publicly tracked on a regular basis using the Case-Shiller index; the statistic is published by Standard & Poor's and is also a component of S&P's 10-city composite index of the value of the residential real estate market.

In 2005, the Miami area had a total of 2.3 million housing units, 13% of which were vacant. Of the total housing units, 52% were in single-unit structures, 45% were in multi-unit structures, and 3% were mobile homes. 25% of the housing units were built since 1990. In 2019, over 70% of Miami's residents were renters, with a median rent of $1,355, $180 over the national average.

Households and families: There were 2,338,450 households, The average household size was 2.6 people. Families made up 65% of the households in the Miami area. This figure includes both married-couple families (45%) and other families (20%). Nonfamily households made up 35% of all households in Miami. Most of the nonfamily households were people living alone, but some consisted of people living in households in which no one was related to the householder.

Occupied housing unit characteristics: In 2005, the Miami area had 2.0 million occupied housing units – 1.3 million (66%) owner occupied and 688,000 (34%) renter occupied.

In 2010, housing costs in the Miami area typically represented 40% of household income, compared to 34% nationwide.

In March 2009, Miami area lawmakers passed a 5–10% hike in property tax millage rates throughout the metropolitan area to fund the construction of new schools and to fund understaffed schools and educational institutions, resulting in an increase in residents' property tax bills beginning in the 2009 tax year.

== Politics ==
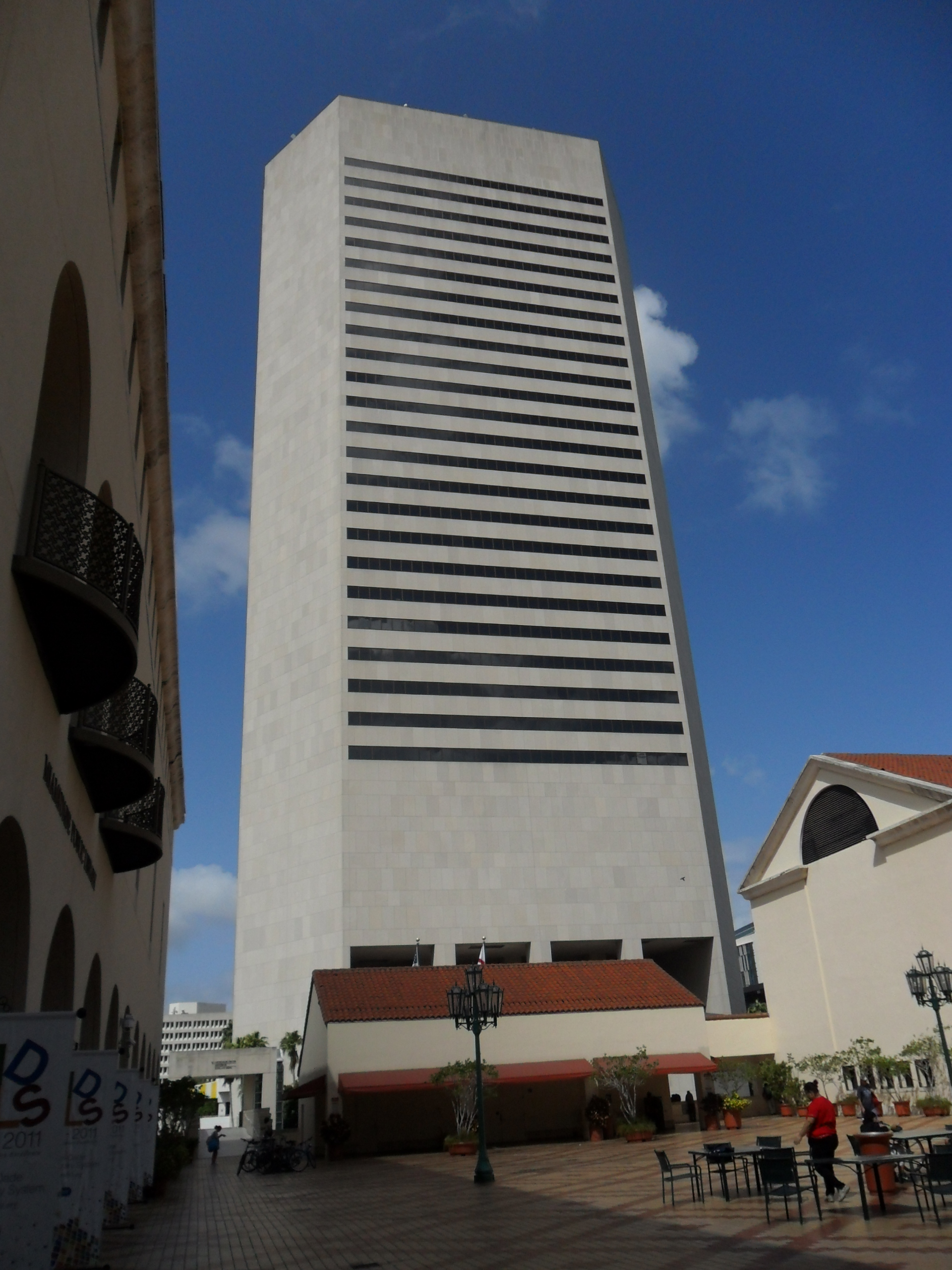
The Stephen P. Clark Government Center in Downtown Miami, headquarters of many of Miami-Dade County's government offices

Politically, metropolitan Miami is strongly Democratic, like most large metropolitan regions in the United States. Broward County is the second-most heavily Democratic county in the state, behind only Gadsden County, which is much smaller. This contrasts with most of the rest of Florida, whose heavier Southern influence and high population of elderly voters makes it a swing or Republican-leaning state.

Miami-Dade County has a relatively high percentage of Republican voters for an urban county, due partially to its Cuban-American population, which leans Republican as a result of its anti-communist views, but Miami-Dade County still remains very Democratic when compared with most of Florida's other counties. Despite being more suburban and affluent, Palm Beach County is reliably Democratic as well and in the 2020 presidential election voted for Democratic candidate Joe Biden by a higher margin than Miami-Dade County did.

2024 Miami metropolitan presidential election

In the 1970s and 1980s, the Non-Group was a dominant influence on the region's government affairs.

In the 2016 presidential election, 62.3% of voters in the Miami metropolitan area voted Democratic. This was the 6th highest of any metro area in the United States. In recent years the area has shifted hard to the Republicans, with former president Donald Trump losing the metro area by 16 points in 2020 compared to losing it by 30 in 2016 (Fueled especially by Miami Dade County shifting 22 points to the right between 2016 and 2020), and Governor Ron DeSantis winning the metro area outright in the 2022 gubernatorial election, winning both Miami Dade and Palm Beach Counties (With the former being won by double digits) while losing Broward only by less than 16 points.

Miami metropolitan presidential election results
Year	Democratic	Republican	Third parties
2024	49.95% 1,360,195	48.89% 1,331,378	1.15% 31,387
2020	57.73% 1,670,188	41.51% 1,200,953	0.76% 22,014
2016	62.32% 1,552,139	34.82% 867,352	2.86% 71,300
2012	62.53% 1,399,403	36.84% 824,480	0.63% 14,089

=== Government ===
The metropolitan area is governed by three counties. In total, there are 107 municipalities or incorporated places in the metropolis. Each municipality has its own city, town, or village government, although there is no distinction between the three names. Much of the land in the metropolis is unincorporated, which means it does not belong to any municipality, and therefore is governed directly by the county it is located in.

=== Congressional districts ===
The Miami metropolitan area contains all or part of nine Congressional districts: the 18th, 20th, 21st, 22nd, 23rd, 24th, 25th, 26th, and 27th districts. As of 2017 (the 113th Congress), the Cook Partisan Voting Index listed four as being Republican-leaning: the 18th, 25th, 26th, and 27th, with the 25th being the most Republican-leaning at R+5, and five as being Democratic-leaning: the 20th, 21st, 22nd, 23rd, and 24th, with the 24th being the most Democratic-leaning at D+34, making it the ninth-most Democratic-leaning district in the nation.

== Economy ==
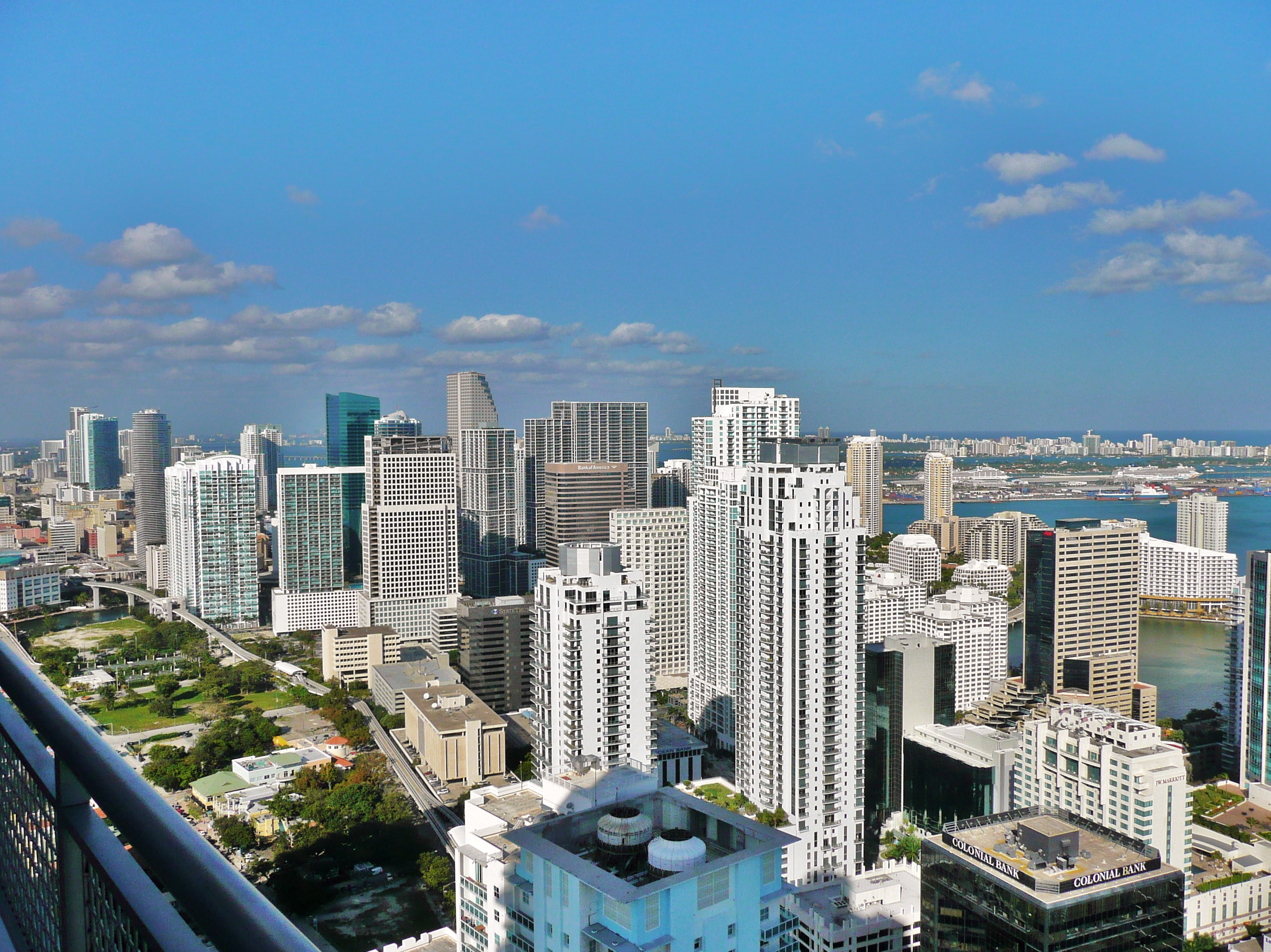
Brickell, an urban neighborhood in Downtown Miami, contains the largest concentration of international banks in the U.S.

	GDP (billion US$)	Population (2024)	GDP per capita (US$)
Miami-Dade County	260.837	2,812,144	92,754
Broward County	173.651	2,013,689	86,235
Palm Beach County	140.506	1,574,148	89,258
Miami-Fort Lauderdale-West Palm Beach, FL (MSA)	574.994	6,399,981	89,843

Among those employed in the Miami metropolitan area, 32% were management, professional, and related occupations, 30% were sales and office occupations, 18% were service occupations, 11% were construction, extraction, maintenance and repair occupations, and 9% were production, transportation, and material moving occupations. 81% of the people employed were Private wage and salary workers; 12% were Federal, state, or local government workers; and 7% were self-employed.

The median income of households in the Miami area was $43,091. 78% of the households received earnings and 13% received retirement income other than Social Security. 30% of the households received Social Security. The average income from Social Security was $13. These income sources are not mutually exclusive; that is, some households received income from more than one source.

In 2005, for the employed population 16 years and older, the leading industries in the Miami area were educational services, health care, and social assistance, which accounted for 18%, and Professional, scientific, and management, and administrative and waste management services, which accounted for 13% of the population. 79% of Miami area workers drove to work alone in 2005, 10% carpooled, 4% took public transportation, and 4% used other means. The remaining 3% worked at home. Among those who commuted to work, it took them on average 28.5 minutes to get to work.

== Culture ==
=== Miami dialect ===
In Miami-Dade County a unique dialect, commonly called the Miami dialect, is widely spoken. The dialect developed among second- or third-generation Hispanics, including Cuban-Americans, whose first language was English, though some non-Hispanic white, black, and other races who were born and raised in Miami-Dade tend to adopt it as well. It is based on a fairly standard American accent but with some changes very similar to dialects in the Mid-Atlantic, especially the New York area dialect, Northern New Jersey English, and New York Latino English. Unlike Virginia Piedmont, Coastal Southern American, and Northeast American dialects and Florida Cracker dialect of the Miami accent is rhotic; it also incorporates a rhythm and pronunciation heavily influenced by Spanish in which rhythm is syllable-timed.

It is possible to differentiate the Miami accent from a variety of interlanguages spoken by second-language speakers. The Miami accent does not generally display addition of /ɛ/ before initial consonant clusters with /s/, speakers do not confuse of /dʒ/ with /j/, (e.g., Yale with jail), and /r/ and /rr/ are pronounced as alveolar approximant [ɹ] instead of alveolar tap [ɾ] or alveolar trill [r] in Spanish.

== Area codes ==
- 305: Miami-Dade County and the Florida Keys; overlaid by 786
- 786: Miami-Dade County and the Florida Keys; overlays with 305
- 954: All of Broward County: Fort Lauderdale, Hollywood, Coral Springs, Pompano Beach, overlaid by 754
- 754: All of Broward County: Fort Lauderdale, Hollywood, Coral Springs, Pompano Beach, overlays with 954
- 561: All of Palm Beach County: West Palm Beach, Boca Raton, Boynton Beach, Delray Beach, overlaid by 728
- 728: All of Palm Beach County: West Palm Beach, Boca Raton, Boynton Beach, Delray Beach, overlays with 561

== Media ==
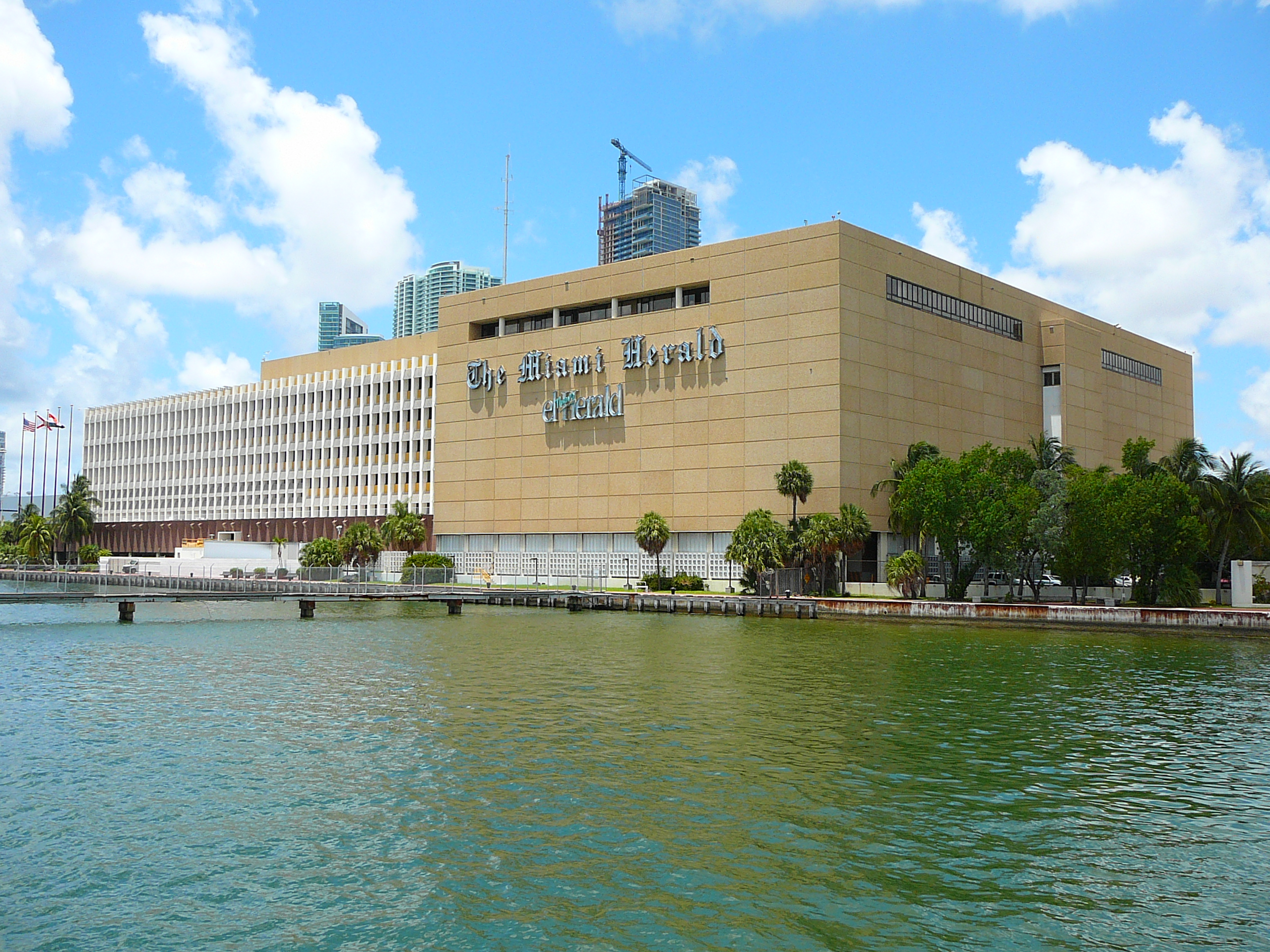
The Miami Herald's headquarters on Biscayne Bay in Downtown Miami from 1963 until 2013, when the building was sold to a Malaysian company for $236 million and demolished. The Miami Herald is now headquartered in Doral, about 13 miles from Downtown Miami

Greater Miami is served by several English-language and two major Spanish-language daily newspapers. The Miami Herald, headquartered in Doral, is Miami's primary newspaper with over a million readers. It also has news bureaus in Broward County, Monroe County, and Nassau, Bahamas. The South Florida Sun-Sentinel circulates primarily in Broward and southern Palm Beach counties and also has a news bureau in Havana, Cuba.

The Palm Beach Post serves mainly Palm Beach County, especially the central and northern regions, and the Treasure Coast. The Boca Raton News publishes five days a week and circulates in southern Palm Beach County. El Nuevo Herald, a subsidiary of the Miami Herald, and Diario Las Americas, are Spanish-language daily papers that circulate mainly in Miami-Dade County. La Palma and El Sentinel are weekly Spanish newspapers published by the Palm Beach Post and Sun-Sentinel, respectively, and circulate in the same areas as their English-language counterparts.

There are several university student-run newspapers in the area, including The Miami Hurricane at the University of Miami, University Press at Florida Atlantic University, PantherNOW at Florida International University, and The Current at Nova Southeastern University.

Greater Miami is split into two separate television/radio markets: The Miami-Fort Lauderdale market serves Miami-Dade, Broward and the Florida Keys. The West Palm Beach market serves Palm Beach County and the Treasure Coast region.

Miami-Fort Lauderdale is the 12th largest radio market and the 16th-largest television market in the U.S. television stations serving the Miami-Fort Lauderdale area include WAMI-TV (UniMas), WBFS-TV (The CW), WSFL-TV (Independent), WFOR-TV (CBS), WHFT-TV (TBN), WLTV (Univision), WPLG (Independent), WPXM (ION), WSCV (Telemundo), WSVN (FOX, with ABC on DT2), WTVJ (NBC), WLRN-TV (PBS), and WPBT (also PBS), the latter television station being the only channel to serve the entire metropolitan area.

West Palm Beach is the 49th largest radio market and the 38th-largest television market in the U.S. Television stations serving the West Palm Beach area include WPTV (NBC), WHDT (Independent), WPEC (CBS), WPBF (ABC), WFLX (FOX), WTVX (The CW), WXEL (PBS), WTCN (MyNetworkTV), and WPXP (ION). The West Palm Beach market shares use of WSCV and WLTV for Telemundo and Univision respectively. Also, both markets cross over and tend to be available interchangeably between both areas. In 2015, WPBT and WXEL merged their operations, to form South Florida PBS, although both stations have maintained separate programming schedules and social media platforms, but share the same subchannel lineup.

== Education ==
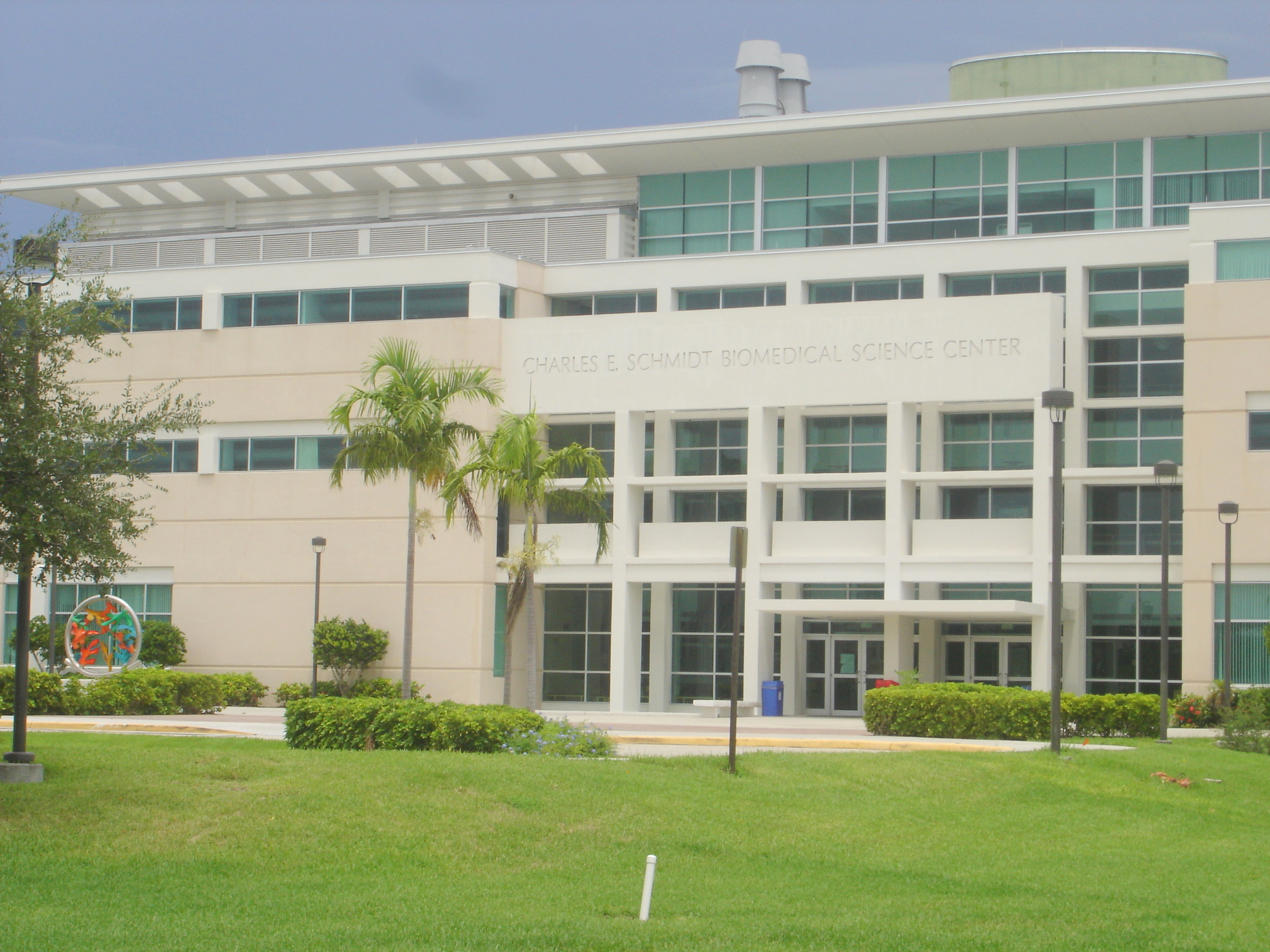
Florida Atlantic University in Boca Raton

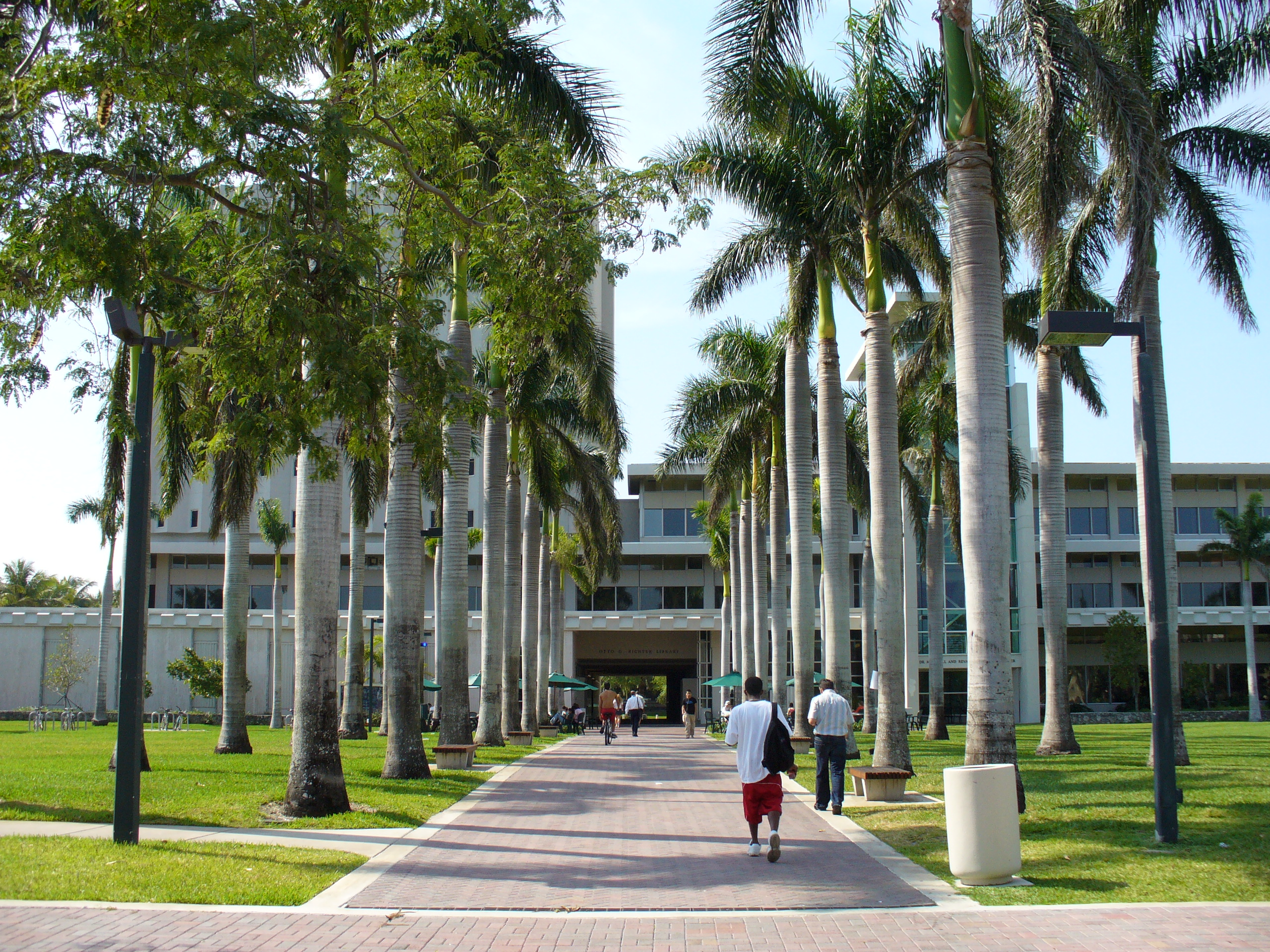
University of Miami in Coral Gables

Nova Southeastern University in Davie

In Florida, each county is also a school district. Each district is headed by an elected school board. A professional superintendent manages the day-to-day operations of each district, who is appointed by and serves at the pleasure of the school board.

The Miami-Dade County Public School District is currently the 4th-largest public school district in the nation. The School District of Palm Beach County is the 4th-largest in Florida and the 11th-largest in the United States. Broward County Public School District is the 6th-largest in the United States.

The University of Miami is one of the top-ranked private research institutions in the United States, and has the most selective admissions standards of Florida's 171 colleges and universities.

As of 2023, Florida International University, with over 55,000 enrolled students, is the eighth-largest public university by enrollment in the nation.

Some colleges and universities in Greater Miami include:

- Barry University (private/Catholic)
- Broward College (public)
- Carlos Albizu University (private)
- Chamberlain University (private)
- Florida Atlantic University (public)
- Florida International University (public)
- Florida Memorial University (private/Baptist)
- Florida National University (private)
- Jersey College (private)
- Keiser University (private)
- Lynn University (private)
- Miami Dade College (public)
- Miami International University of Art & Design (private)
- Nova Southeastern University (private)
- Palm Beach Atlantic University (private/Christian)
- Palm Beach State College (public)
- St. Thomas University (private/Catholic)
- University of Fort Lauderdale (private/Christian)
- University of Miami (private)

== Transportation ==
=== Roads ===
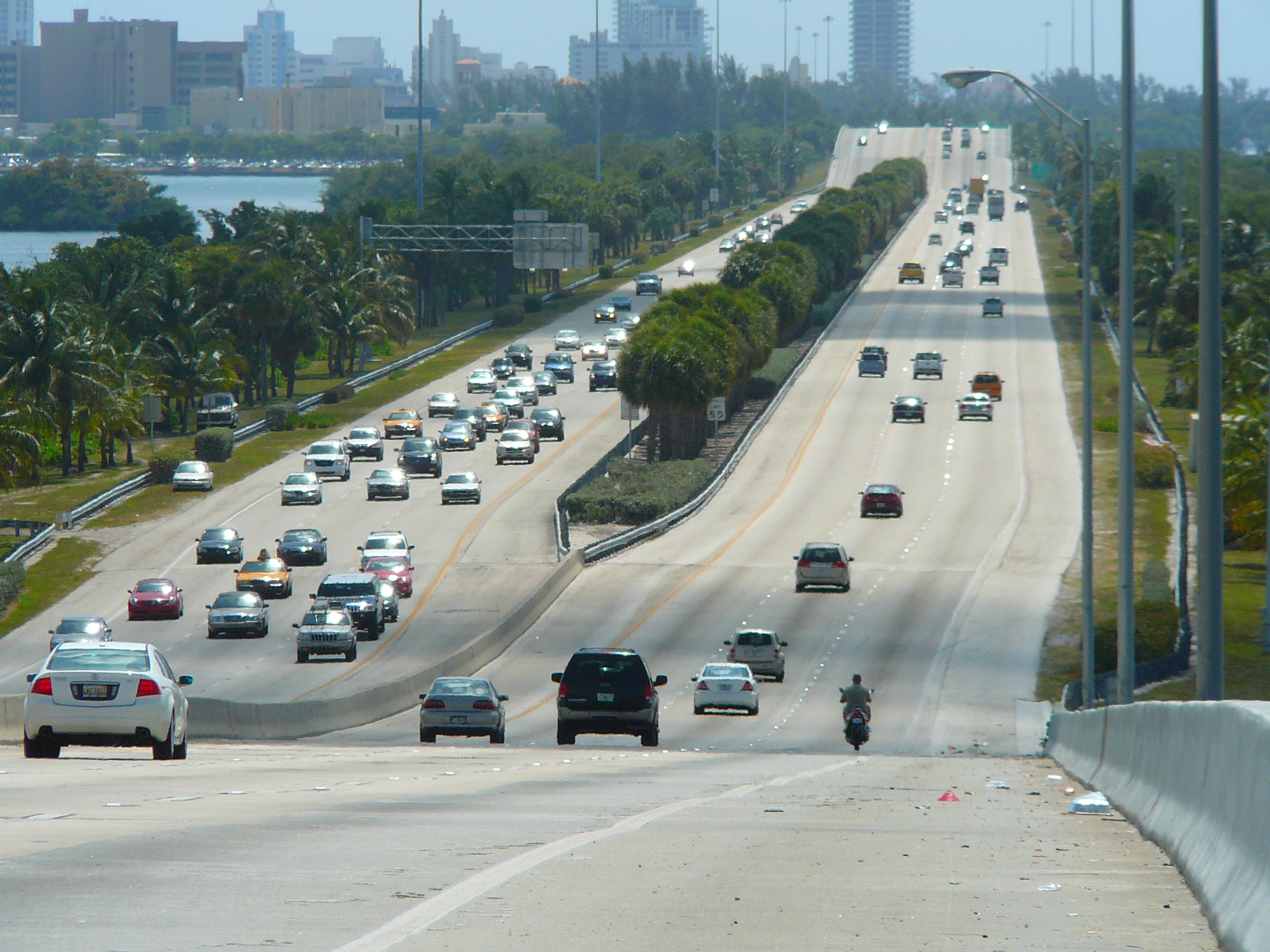
Julia Tuttle Causeway, which connects Miami and Miami Beach, May 2008

The Miami metropolitan area is served by five interstate highways operated by the Florida Department of Transportation in conjunction with local agencies. I-95 runs north to south along the coast, ending just south of Downtown Miami at South Dixie Highway (US 1). I-75 runs east to west, turning south in western Broward County and connecting suburban north Miami-Dade to Naples on the Southwest Coast via Alligator Alley, which transverses the Florida Everglades before turning north.

I-595 connects the Broward coast and Downtown Fort Lauderdale to I-75 and Alligator Alley. In Miami, I-195 and I-395 relay the main I-95 route east to Biscayne Boulevard (US 1) and Miami Beach across Biscayne Bay via the Julia Tuttle and MacArthur causeways.

In Greater Miami, the Miami-Dade Expressway Authority and Florida's Turnpike Enterprise maintain eight state expressways in conjunction with the Florida Department of Transportation. The Airport Expressway and the Dolphin Expressway relay western Miami-Dade suburbs to the eastern urban coast at I-95, and to Miami Beach via I-195 and I-395 at the Airport and Midtown interchanges. The Gratigny Parkway connects northern Miami suburbs to the southern end of I-75.

The Palmetto Expressway is the primary beltway road of urban Miami, relaying I-95 and Florida's Turnpike at the Golden Glades Interchange near northeastern North Miami Beach to the southern inland suburbs of Kendall and Pinecrest. The Don Shula Expressway and the Homestead Extension of Florida's Turnpike form the southernmost end of the beltway, connecting the Palmetto Expressway to the bedroom communities of Homestead and Florida City. The Snapper Creek Expressway relays the Don Shula Expressway to South Dixie Highway (US 1).

The urban bypass expressway in Greater Fort Lauderdale is the Sawgrass Expressway (SR 869), connecting the northern Broward County coast at I-95 and Deerfield Beach to I-595 and I-75 at Alligator Alley in Sunrise.

Express lanes on I-95 start in Miami-Dade County and continue into Broward County. With an increased presence of traffic in South Florida, express lanes have been implemented in southern Palm Beach County.

==== Major freeways and tollways ====
- I-95
- I-75
- I-195 / SR 112 (Airport Expressway)
- I-395 / SR 836 (Dolphin Expressway)
- I-595 (Port Everglades Expressway)
- Florida's Turnpike, including the Homestead Extension
- SR 924 (Gratigny Parkway)
- SR 874 (Don Shula Expressway)
- SR 878 (Snapper Creek Expressway)
- SR 869 (Sawgrass Expressway)
- SR 826 (Palmetto Expressway)

=== Major airports ===
The metropolitan area is served by three major commercial airports. These airports combine to make the fourth largest domestic origin and destination market in the United States, after New York City, Los Angeles, and Chicago.

Airport	IATA code	County	FAA Category
Miami International Airport	MIA	Miami-Dade	Large Hub
Fort Lauderdale–Hollywood International Airport	FLL	Broward	Large Hub
President Donald J. Trump International Airport	DJT	Palm Beach	Medium Hub

The following smaller general aviation airports are also in the metro area:

Airport	IATA code	ICAO code	County
Dade-Collier Training and Transition Airport	TNT	KTNT	Miami-Dade
Miami Homestead General Aviation Airport			Miami-Dade
Homestead Joint Air Reserve Base	HST	KHST	Miami-Dade
Miami Executive Airport	TMB	KTMB	Miami-Dade
Miami-Opa Locka Executive Airport	OPF	KOPF	Miami-Dade
Fort Lauderdale Executive Airport	FXE	KFXE	Broward
North Perry Airport	HWO	KHWO	Broward
Pompano Beach Airpark	PPM	KPMP	Broward
North Palm Beach County General Aviation Airport			Palm Beach
Palm Beach County Park Airport	LNA	KLNA	Palm Beach
Boca Raton Airport	BCT	KBCT	Palm Beach

=== Seaports ===
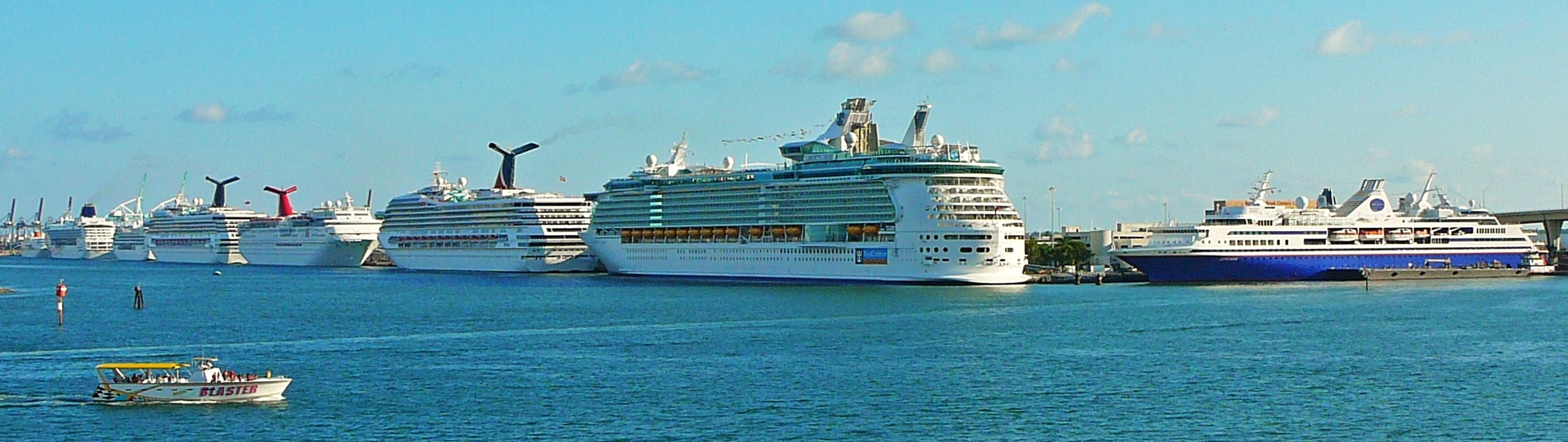
The Port of Miami, the world's busiest cruise ship port, December 2007

The metropolis also has four seaports, the largest and most important being the Port of Miami. Others in the area include Port Everglades, Port of Palm Beach and the Miami River Port.

On August 21, 2012, PortMiami and the U.S. Army Corps of Engineers signed the Partnership Agreement construction agreement that will allow the Deep Dredge project to go out for bid. The Deep Dredge project was completed in 2015.

=== Public transportation ===
Miami-Dade Transit is the largest public transit agency in Florida, operating rapid transit, people movers, and an intercity bus system. Metrorail is Florida's only rapid transit, currently with 23 stations on a 24.4-mile (39.3 km) track. The Downtown Miami people mover, Metromover, operates 20 stations and three lines on a 4.4-mile (7.1 km) track through the Downtown neighborhoods of the Arts & Entertainment District, the Central Business District, and Brickell.

Metrobus serves the entirety of Miami-Dade County, Monroe County as far south as Marathon, and Broward County as far north as Downtown Fort Lauderdale. In Broward County, Broward County Transit runs public buses, as does Palm Tran in Palm Beach County.

The South Florida Regional Transportation Authority operates Tri-Rail, a commuter rail train that connects the three primary cities of South Florida (Miami, Fort Lauderdale, and West Palm Beach), and most intermediate points. Brightline provides service to Miami, Aventura, West Palm Beach, Fort Lauderdale, Boca Raton, and Central Florida's Orlando, with talks to expand to Tampa and Jacksonville.

== Sports ==
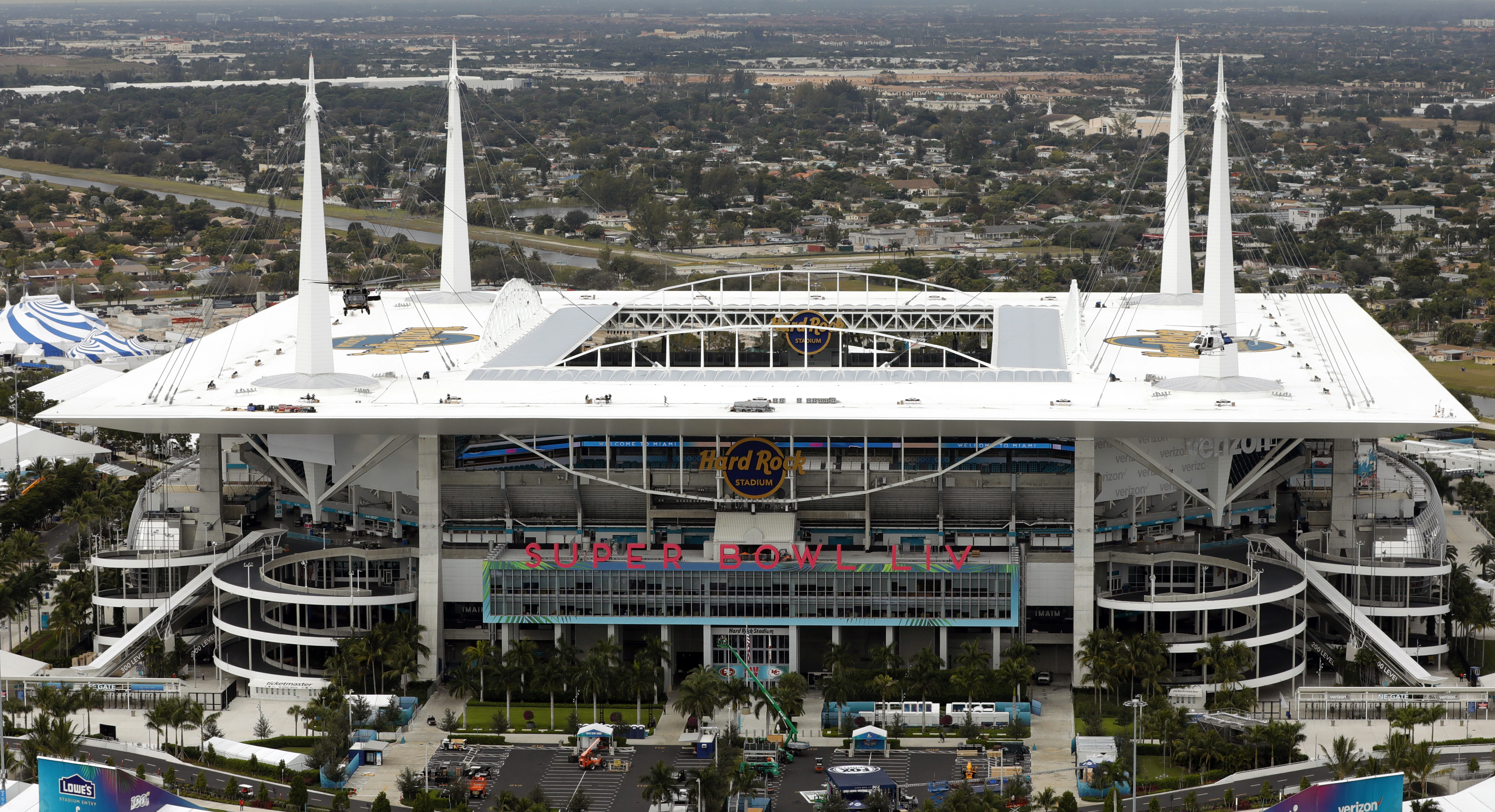
Hard Rock Stadium in Miami Gardens, the home field for both the Miami Dolphins of the National Football League and the Miami Hurricanes of NCAA Division I college football

=== Professional ===
The Miami metro area is home to five major league professional sports teams.

Professional team	League	Sport	Venue	City	Established	Championships
Miami Dolphins	National Football League (NFL)	Football	Hard Rock Stadium	Miami Gardens	1965	2
Inter Miami CF	Major League Soccer (MLS)	Soccer	Nu Stadium	Miami (Grapeland Heights)	2018	1
Miami Heat	National Basketball Association (NBA)	Basketball	Kaseya Center	Downtown Miami	1988	3
Miami Marlins	Major League Baseball (MLB)	Baseball	LoanDepot Park	Miami (Little Havana)	1993	2
Florida Panthers	National Hockey League (NHL)	Hockey	Amerant Bank Arena	Sunrise	1993	2

=== College sports ===
The most prominent college sports program in the Miami metropolitan area are the Miami Hurricanes of the University of Miami in Coral Gables, who compete in Division I of the National Collegiate Athletic Association. The University of Miami's football team has won five national championships since 1983 and its baseball team has won four national championships since 1982.

Other collegiate sports programs in the metropolitan area include the Florida Atlantic Owls of Florida Atlantic University in Boca Raton, the FIU Panthers of Florida International University in University Park, the Nova Southeastern Sharks of Nova Southeastern University in Davie, and the Barry Buccaneers of Barry University in Miami Shores.

=== Minor league and other sports ===
The Miami area is also host to minor league sports teams, including:

- The Miami Marlins and St. Louis Cardinals conduct spring training in Jupiter at Roger Dean Stadium.
- The Houston Astros and Washington Nationals conduct spring training in West Palm Beach at Cacti Park of the Palm Beaches.
- Inter Miami CF have a reserve team that plays in MLS Next Pro.
- The Homestead–Miami Speedway oval has hosted NASCAR Cup Series and IndyCar Series events. In 2026, it will host the NASCAR Championship Weekend. Temporary street circuits at Museum Park hosted several CART, IMSA GT, and American Le Mans Series races between from 1986 to 1995, as well as a Formula E race in 2015. The Palm Beach International Raceway is a minor road course.
- The Miami Sharks of Major League Rugby play at AutoNation Sports Field in Fort Lauderdale.

Major professional and D-I college teams (attendance > 10,000)
Club	Sport	League	Venue (capacity)	Attendance	League championships
Miami Dolphins	Football	National Football League	Hard Rock Stadium (64,767)	70,035	Super Bowl (2) — 1972, 1973
Miami Heat	Basketball	National Basketball Association	Kaseya Center (19,600)	19,710	NBA Finals (3) — 2006, 2012, 2013
Miami Marlins	Baseball	Major League Baseball	LoanDepot Park (36,742)	21,386	World Series (2) — 1997, 2003
Inter Miami CF	Soccer	Major League Soccer	Nu Stadium (26,700)	21,550 (Note: Attendance figures are for Chase Stadium in Fort Lauderdale (capacity 21,550), which had been home to Inter through the 2025 season.)	MLS Cup (1) — 2025
Florida Panthers	Hockey	National Hockey League	Amerant Bank Arena (19,250)	19,250	Stanley Cup (2) — 2024, 2025
Miami Hurricanes	Football	NCAA D-I FBS (ACC)	Hard Rock Stadium (64,767)	53,837	National titles (5) — 1983, 1987, 1989, 1991, 2001
Florida Atlantic Owls	Football	NCAA D-1 FBS (American)	Flagler Credit Union Stadium (29,571)	18,948	None
FIU Panthers	Football	NCAA D-I FBS (CUSA)	Pitbull Stadium (23,500)	15,453	None

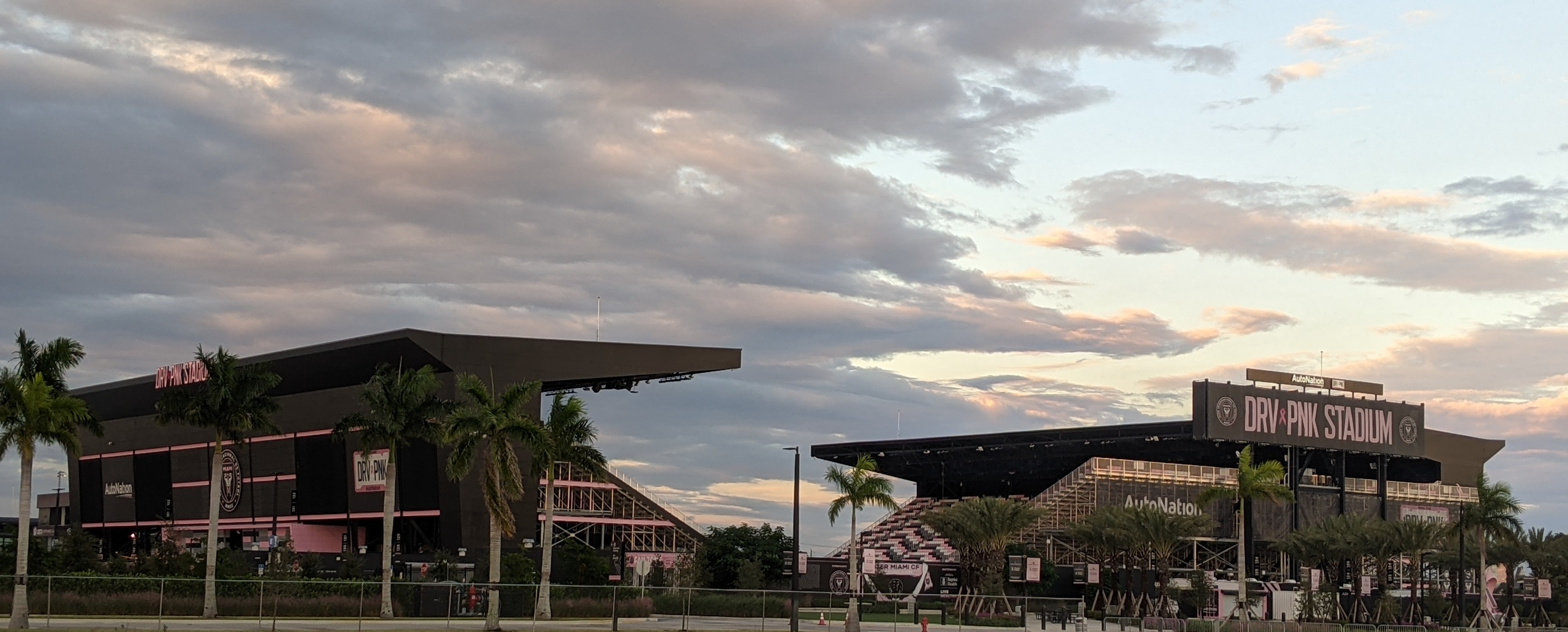
Chase Stadium, former home stadium of Inter Miami of MLS

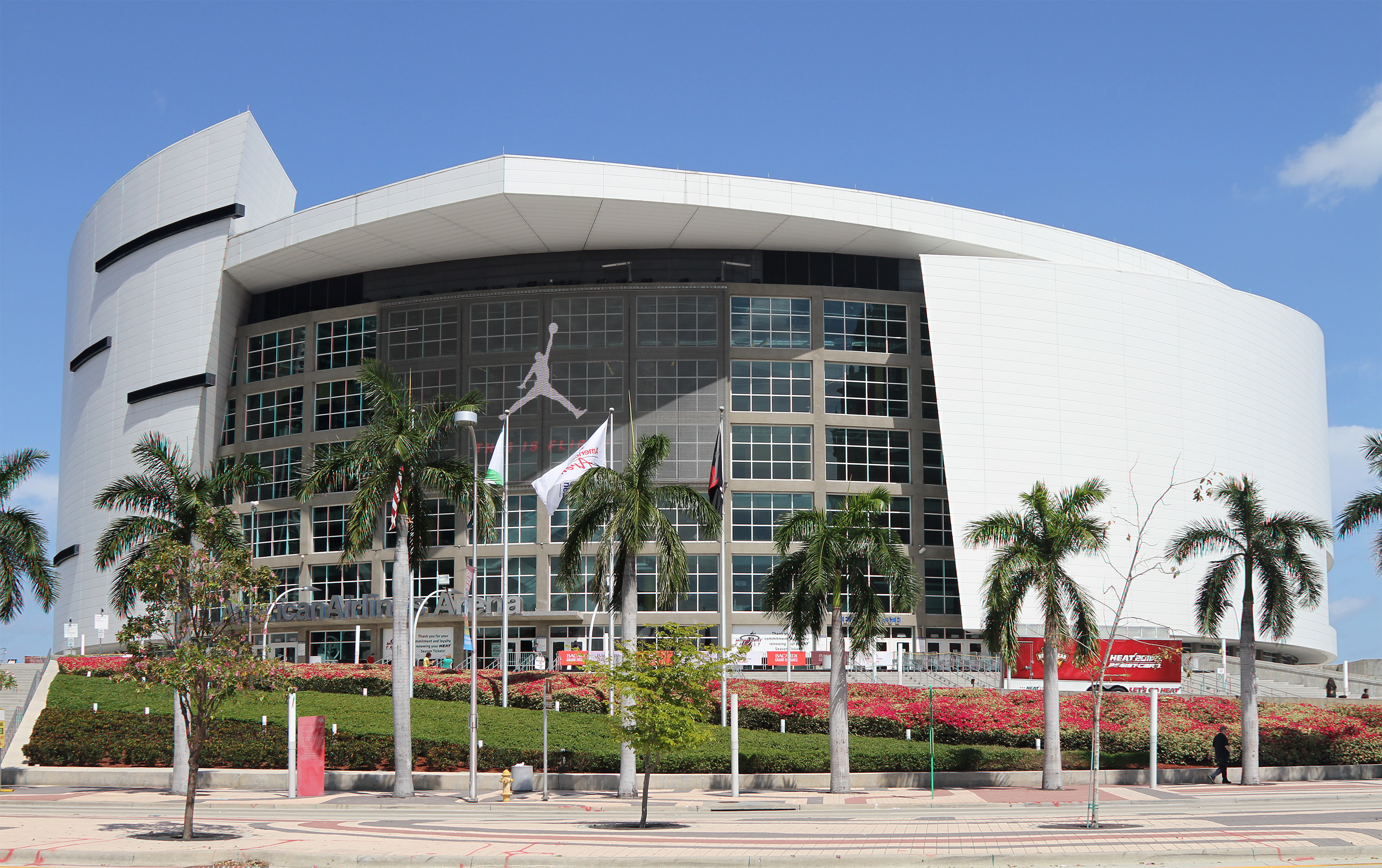
Kaseya Center, home of the Miami Heat of the NBA

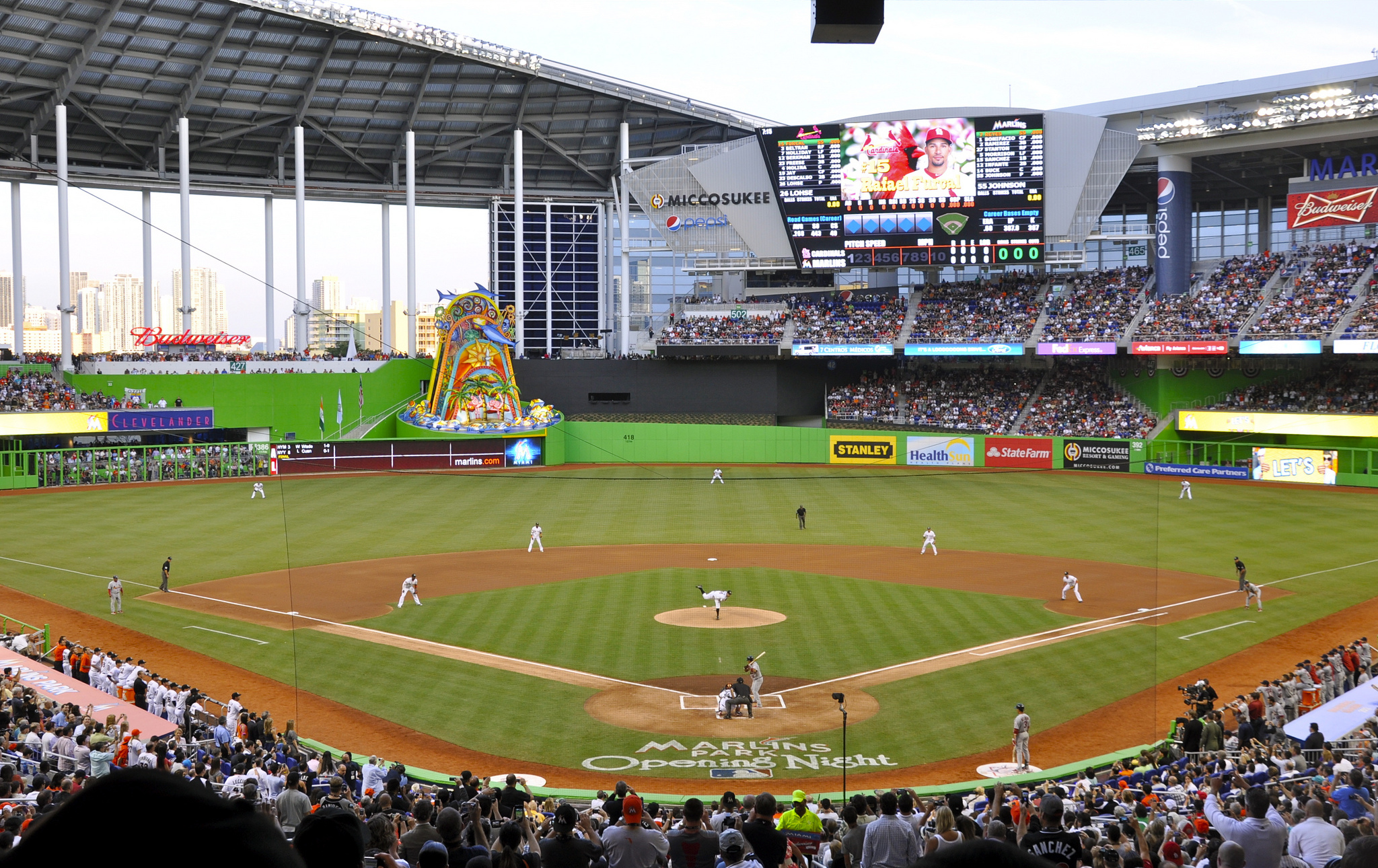
LoanDepot Park, home of the Miami Marlins of MLB

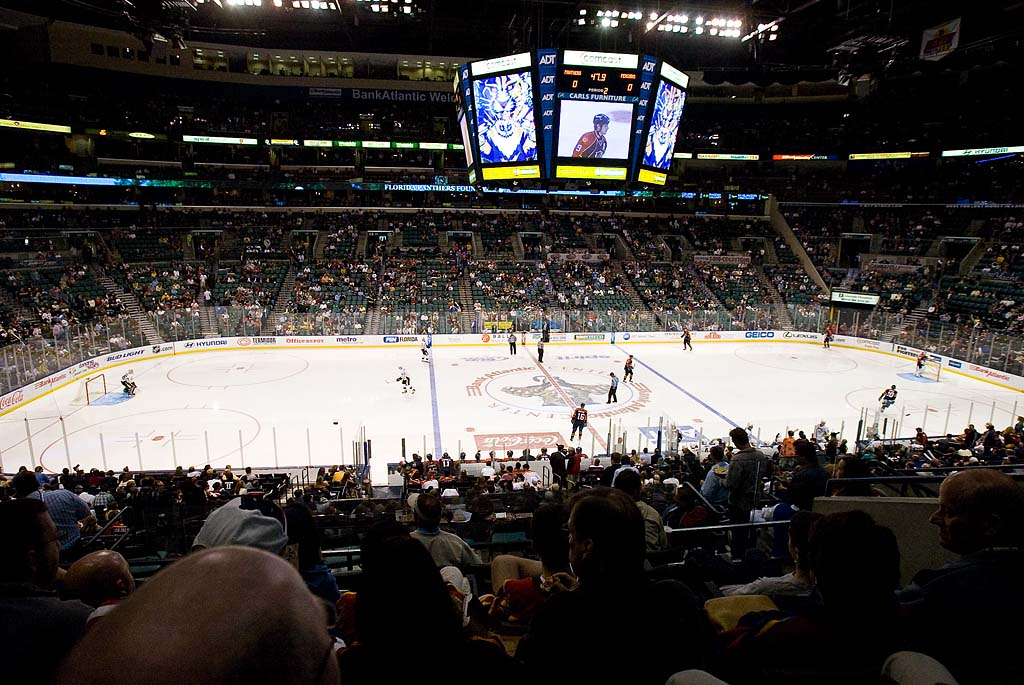
Amerant Bank Arena, home of the Florida Panthers

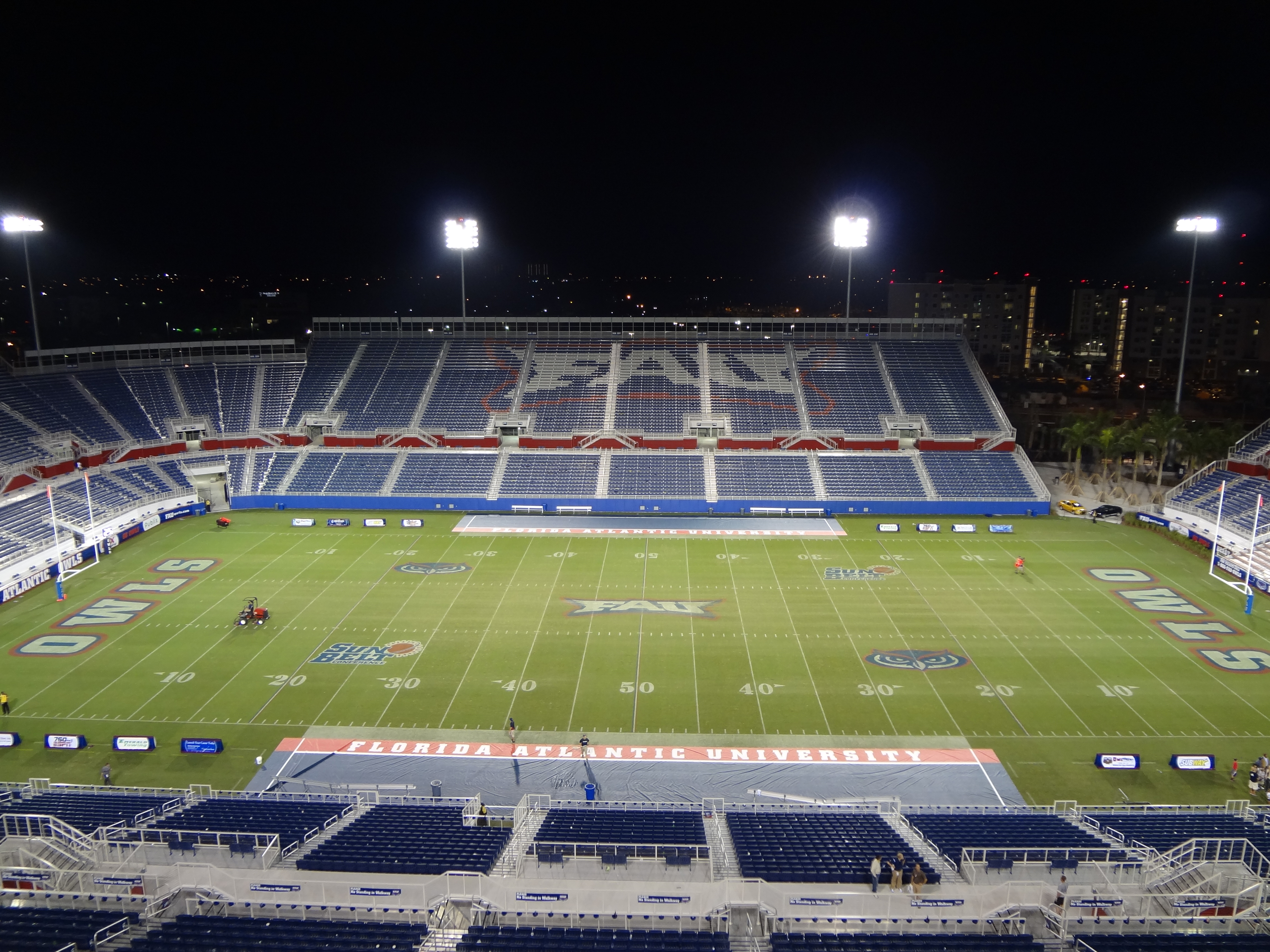
Flagler Credit Union Stadium, home of the Florida Atlantic Owls

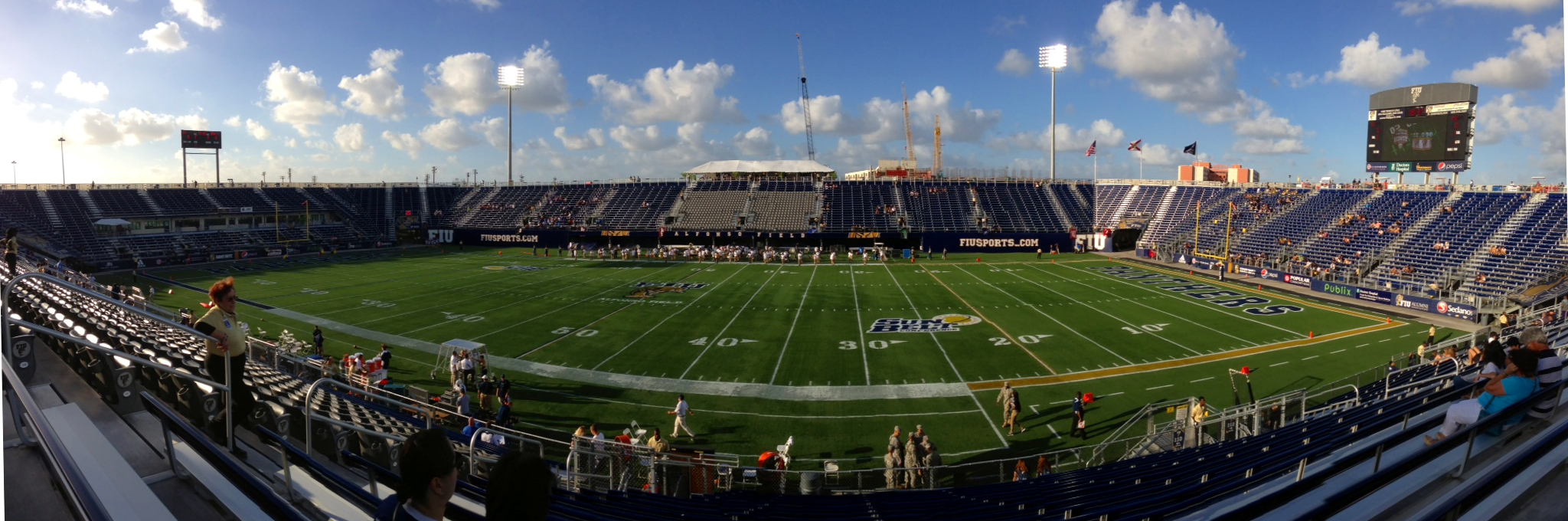
Pitbull Stadium, home of the FIU Panthers

== See also ==
- South Florida
- Florida statistical areas
- United States metropolitan area
- Table of United States Metropolitan Statistical Areas
- Largest metropolitan areas in the Americas
- Everglades - to the west
- Florida Heartland - to the northwest
- Treasure Coast - to the north
- Florida Keys - to the south
