= Dunes Road, Florida =

- unincorporated place
- Interactive map of Dunes Road, Florida
- Coordinates: 26°29′3″N 80°7′7″W
- Country: United States
- State: Florida
- County: Palm Beach

Area
  - Total: 0.50 sq mi (1.3 km^{2})
  - Land: 0.50 sq mi (1.3 km^{2})
  - Water: 0 sq mi (0.0 km^{2})
- Elevation: 16 ft (5 m)

Population (2000)
  - Total: 391
  - Density: 756/sq mi (291.9/km^{2})
- Time zone: UTC-5 (Eastern (EST))
  - Summer (DST): UTC-4 (EDT)
- Area codes: 561, 728
- FIPS code: 12-18612
- GNIS feature ID: 1853246

Dunes Road is a former census-designated place (CDP) and current unincorporated place in Palm Beach County, Florida, United States. The population was 391 at the 2000 census.

== Geography ==
Dunes Road is located at 26°29′3″N 80°7′7″W (26.484050, -80.118514).

According to the United States Census Bureau, the CDP has a total area of 1.3 km^{2} (0.50 sq mi), all land.

== Demographics ==
As of the census of 2000, there were 391 people, 136 households, and 110 families living in the CDP. The population density was 290.3 people/km^{2} (752 people/mi^{2}). There were 142 housing units at an average density of 105.4 units/km^{2} (273 units/mi^{2}). The racial makeup of the CDP was 91.56% White (87.2% were Non-Hispanic White), 6.39% African American, 0.77% Asian, and 1.28% from two or more races. Hispanic or Latino of any race were 4.35% of the population.

In 2000, there were 136 households, out of which 39.7% had children under the age of 18 living with them, 63.2% were married couples living together, 13.2% had a female householder with no husband present, and 18.4% were non-families. 14.0% of all households were made up of individuals, and 4.4% had someone living alone who was 65 years of age or older. The average household size was 2.88 and the average family size was 3.14.

In 2000, in the former CDP, the population was spread out, with 28.6% under the age of 18, 4.1% from 18 to 24, 25.8% from 25 to 44, 32.2% from 45 to 64, and 9.2% who were 65 years of age or older. The median age was 40 years. For every 100 females, there were 98.5 males. For every 100 females age 18 and over, there were 95.1 males.

In 2000, the median income for a household in the CDP was $87,671, and the median income for a family was $73,929. Males had a median income of $42,917 versus $53,000 for females. The per capita income for the CDP was $33,019. About 7.1% of families and 3.4% of the population were below the poverty line, including 3.4% of those under age 18 and none of those age 65 or over.

As of 2000, English was the first language for 100% of the population.
