= Florida's 22nd congressional district =

U.S. House district for Florida

Coordinates: 26°24′12″N 80°04′40″W

- Map of district boundaries
- Representative: Lois Frankel; D–West Palm Beach
- Area: 262 mi^{2} (680 km^{2})
- Distribution: 100% urban; 0% rural
- Population (2025): 808,589
- Median household income: $84,558
- Ethnicity: 50.7% White; 27.3% Hispanic; 15.6% Black; 2.9% Two or more races; 2.8% Asian; 0.8% other
- Cook PVI: R+4

Florida's 22nd congressional district is a U.S. congressional district in Southeast Florida. In the 2020 redistricting cycle, it was drawn as a successor to the previous 21st district and includes Palm Beach, West Palm Beach, Boynton Beach and Delray Beach, as well as unincorporated Palm Beach County. The previous iteration of the 22nd district, which extended from Fort Lauderdale to Boca Raton, was instead renamed the 23rd district.

The district was created in 1993 in response to the 1990 United States census, mostly out of the former 15th District. Clay Shaw, who had represented the 15th and its predecessors since 1981, represented this district until 2007, when he lost re-election to Democrat Ron Klein. However, Klein himself was ousted by Republican Allen West during the 2010 midterms. After redistricting made the 22nd friendlier to Democrats, West left the district for an unsuccessful bid for re-election in the 18th district.

The 22nd Congressional District was the center of the disputed 2000 presidential election in Florida and the ensuing recount. From 2017 to 2023, the district encompassed the coastline of Broward County to southern Palm Beach County and included Boca Raton, Fort Lauderdale, Coral Springs and part of Pompano Beach. It also included Florida Atlantic University and Port Everglades, the third busiest cruise port in the world.

The new district is represented by Democrat Lois Frankel, an incumbent from the 21st district who was re-elected in 2022. Fellow Democrat Ted Deutch represented the old 22nd congressional district from 2017 after he was redistricted from Florida's 21st congressional district until his resignation on September 30, 2022.

The new 22nd district has one of the highest populations of Jewish Americans in the country. In 2020, the election between two Jewish candidates, Democratic incumbent Rep. Lois Frankel and right-wing activist Laura Loomer, for what was then the 21st district, drew national attention. Loomer used Holocaust imagery and Yiddish to attack Frankel as an opponent of Jewish interests.

== Characteristics ==
- Male: 48.8%
- Female: 51.2%
- Median age: 43.0
- 18 years and over: 81.1%
- 65 years and over: 20.8%
- Employed: 58.1%
- Median household income: $51,200
- Families below poverty level: 4.6%
- Bachelor's degree or higher: 34.1%

== Recent election results from statewide races ==
| Year | Office | Results |
|---|---|---|
| 2008 | President | Obama 64% - 36% |
| 2010 | Governor | Sink 63% - 37% |
| 2010 | Attorney General | Gelber 55% - 39% |
| 2010 | Chief Financial Officer | Atwater 47.0% - 46.9% |
| 2012 | President | Obama 61% - 39% |
| 2012 | Senate | Nelson 67% - 33% |
| 2014 | Governor | Crist 64% - 36% |
| 2016 | President | Clinton 59% - 39% |
| 2016 | Senate | Murphy 56% - 42% |
| 2018 | Senate | Nelson 61% - 39% |
| 2018 | Governor | Gillum 61% - 38% |
| 2018 | Attorney General | Shaw 58% - 40% |
| 2018 | Chief Financial Officer | Ring 61% - 39% |
| 2020 | President | Biden 58% - 41% |
| 2022 | Senate | Demings 53% - 46% |
| 2022 | Governor | Crist 51% - 48% |
| 2022 | Attorney General | Ayala 51% - 49% |
| 2022 | Chief Financial Officer | Hattersley 52% - 48% |
| 2024 | President | Harris 52% - 47% |
| 2024 | Senate | Mucarsel-Powell 53% - 46% |

== Composition ==
For the 118th and successive Congresses (based on redistricting following the 2020 census), the district contains all or portions of the following counties and communities:

Palm Beach County (26)

Acacia Villas, Atlantis, Boynton Beach, Briny Breezes, Cloud Lake, Delray Beach, Glen Ridge, Golf, Greenacres, Gulf Stream, Gun Club Estates, Hypoluxo, Kenwood Estates, Lake Clarke Shores, Lake Worth Beach, Lantana, Manalapan, Ocean Ridge, Palm Beach, Palm Springs, Pine Air, San Castle, Seminole Manor, South Palm Beach, Wellington, West Palm Beach

== List of members representing the district ==
| Member | Party | Years | Cong ress | Electoral history | District location |
|---|---|---|---|---|---|
District created January 3, 1993
| Clay Shaw (Fort Lauderdale) | Republican | January 3, 1993 – January 3, 2007 | 103rd 104th 105th 106th 107th 108th 109th | Redistricted from the 15th district and re-elected in 1992. Re-elected in 1994. Re-elected in 1996. Re-elected in 1998. Re-elected in 2000. Re-elected in 2002. Re-elected in 2004. Lost re-election. | 1993–2003; Parts of Broward, Miami-Dade, and Palm Beach |
| Clay Shaw (Fort Lauderdale) | Republican | January 3, 1993 – January 3, 2007 | 103rd 104th 105th 106th 107th 108th 109th | Redistricted from the 15th district and re-elected in 1992. Re-elected in 1994. Re-elected in 1996. Re-elected in 1998. Re-elected in 2000. Re-elected in 2002. Re-elected in 2004. Lost re-election. | 2003–2013 Parts of Broward and Palm Beach |
| Ron Klein (Boca Raton) | Democratic | January 3, 2007 – January 3, 2011 | 110th 111th | Elected in 2006. Re-elected in 2008. Lost re-election. | 2003–2013 Parts of Broward and Palm Beach |
| Allen West (Plantation) | Republican | January 3, 2011 – January 3, 2013 | 112th | Elected in 2010. Redistricted to the 18th district and lost re-election. | 2003–2013 Parts of Broward and Palm Beach |
| Lois Frankel (West Palm Beach) | Democratic | January 3, 2013 – January 3, 2017 | 113th 114th | Elected in 2012. Re-elected in 2014. Redistricted to the 21st district. | 2013–2017 Parts of Broward and Palm Beach |
| Ted Deutch (Boca Raton) | Democratic | January 3, 2017 – September 30, 2022 | 115th 116th 117th | Redistricted from the 21st district and re-elected in 2016. Re-elected in 2018. Re-elected in 2020. Retired and resigned to become CEO of the American Jewish Committee. | 2017–2023 Parts of Broward and Palm Beach |
| Vacant | | September 30, 2022 – January 3, 2023 | 117th | | 2017–2023 Parts of Broward and Palm Beach |
| Lois Frankel (West Palm Beach) | Democratic | January 3, 2023 – present | 118th 119th | Redistricted from the 21st district and re-elected in 2022. Re-elected in 2024. Redistricted to the 23rd district. | 2023–2027: Parts of Palm Beach |
| Pia Dandiya (Palm Beach Gardens) | Democratic | Assuming office on January 3, 2027 | | Elected in 2026. | 2027–present: |

== Election results ==
=== 1992 ===
Florida's 22nd Congressional District Election (1992)
| Party | Candidate | Votes | % |
|---|---|---|---|
| Republican | Clay Shaw | 128,400 | 51.97% |
| Democratic | Gwen Margolis | 91,652 | 37.09% |
| Independent | Richard "Even" Stephens | 15,469 | 6.30% |
| Independent | Michael F. Petrie | 6,312 | 2.60% |
| Independent | Bernard Anscher | 5,274 | 2.10% |
| No party | Others | 8 | 0.00% |
| Total votes | | 247,088 | 100.00% |
| Republican hold | | | |

=== 1994 ===
Incumbent Clay Shaw received a primary challenger – Pompano Beach business execute John Stahl. During the primary, Stahl described himself as a "productive-class taxpayer" and labeled Shaw a "career politician". Shaw responded by saying, "I understand business, running a business and my voting record is proof of that." Stahl also accused Shaw of abusing his congressional franking privilege; a report from the National Taxpayers Union indicated that Shaw spent $240,000 for mailings in 1993. Additionally, Stahl vowed to cut his salary to $100,000 if elected. By July 15, 1994, Shaw's campaign contributions totaled $283,390, while Stahl raised only $900. Nevertheless, Shaw defeated Stahl in the primary elected by a vote of 24,252 to 6,925 (77.8%-22.2%).

In the general election, Shaw faced-off against Palm Beach Town Council President Hermine Wiener, a Democrat who left the Republican Party about a year earlier. Wiener did not receive a challenger for the Democratic nomination. Throughout the year, she raised $216,596 and vowed to spend as much as $1 million, if necessary. Shaw signed the Contract with America and specifically promised to reform welfare during the next congress. On October 25, the League of Women Voters hosted a debate between the two candidates at the Broward County Main Library in Fort Lauderdale. Shaw was endorsed by The News, a Boca Raton-based newspaper, and the Sun-Sentinel. The former cited Wiener's lack of specifics on key issues such as health care and immigration as their rationale for favoring Shaw. However, The News also stated that Shaw "hasn't paid enough attention to his new constituents." The Sun-Sentinel praised Shaw for his positions on various issues, and remarked that "[he is an] intelligent, hard-working congressman who has shown effectiveness and leadership ability while maintaining a high level of integrity during his entire political career."

Overall, Wiener received little support from prominent local elected officials, as Shaw was favored to win re-election. Shaw did, in fact, handily defeat Wiener in the general election by a margin of 63.36%-36.64%.

Florida's 22nd Congressional District Election (1994)
| Party | Candidate | Votes | % |
|---|---|---|---|
| Republican | Clay Shaw (Incumbent) | 119,696 | 63.36% |
| Democratic | Hermine L. Wiener | 69,221 | 36.64% |
| Total votes | | 188,917 | 100.00% |
| Republican hold | | | |

=== 1996 ===
Florida's 22nd Congressional District Election (1996)
| Party | Candidate | Votes | % |
|---|---|---|---|
| Republican | Clay Shaw (Incumbent) | 137,098 | 61.86% |
| Democratic | Kenneth D. Cooper | 84,517 | 38.14% |
| No party | Others | 3 | 0.00% |
| Total votes | | 221,618 | 100.00% |
| Republican hold | | | |

=== 1998 ===
On January 19, 1998, incumbent Clay Shaw announced that he would seek re-election for a ninth term. Shaw faced no opposition in either the primary on September 1 or the general election on November 3.

Florida's 22nd Congressional District Election (1998)
| Party | Candidate | Votes | % |
|---|---|---|---|
| Republican | Clay Shaw (Incumbent) | | 100.00% |
| Total votes | | | 100.00% |
| Republican hold | | | |

=== 2000 ===
Florida's 22nd Congressional District Election (2000)
| Party | Candidate | Votes | % |
|---|---|---|---|
| Republican | Clay Shaw (Incumbent) | 105,855 | 50.14% |
| Democratic | Elaine Bloom | 105,256 | 49.86% |
| No party | Others | 1 | 0.00% |
| Total votes | | 211,112 | 100.00% |
| Republican hold | | | |

=== 2002 ===
Florida's 22nd Congressional District Election (2002)
| Party | Candidate | Votes | % |
|---|---|---|---|
| Republican | Clay Shaw (Incumbent) | 131,930 | 60.77% |
| Democratic | Carol Roberts | 83,265 | 38.35% |
| Independent | Juan Xuna | 1,902 | 0.88% |
| No party | Others | 18 | 0.01% |
| Total votes | | 217,115 | 100.00% |
| Republican hold | | | |

=== 2004 ===
Florida's 22nd Congressional District Election (2004)
| Party | Candidate | Votes | % |
|---|---|---|---|
| Republican | Clay Shaw (Incumbent) | 192,581 | 62.79% |
| Democratic | Robin Rorapaugh | 108,258 | 35.30% |
| Constitution | Jack McLain | 5,260 | 1.72% |
| No party | Others | 627 | 0.20% |
| Total votes | | 306,726 | 100.00% |
| Republican hold | | | |

=== 2006 ===
Florida's 22nd Congressional District Election (2006)
| Party | Candidate | Votes | % |
|---|---|---|---|
| Democratic | Ron Klein | 108,688 | 50.88% |
| Republican | Clay Shaw | 100,663 | 47.13% |
| Independent | Neil Evangelista | 4,254 | 1.99% |
| Total votes | | 213,605 | 100.00% |
| Democratic gain from Republican | | | |

=== 2008 ===
Florida's 22nd Congressional District Election (2008)
| Party | Candidate | Votes | % |
|---|---|---|---|
| Democratic | Ron Klein (Incumbent) | 169,041 | 54.68% |
| Republican | Allen B. West | 140,104 | 45.32% |
| Total votes | | 309,145 | 100.00% |
| Democratic hold | | | |

=== 2010 ===
Florida's 22nd Congressional District Election (2010)
| Party | Candidate | Votes | % |
|---|---|---|---|
| Republican | Allen B. West | 118,890 | 54.36% |
| Democratic | Ron Klein (Incumbent) | 99,804 | 45.64% |
| Total votes | | 218,694 | 100.00% |
| Republican gain from Democratic | | | |

=== 2012 ===
Florida 22nd Congressional District 2012
| Party | Candidate | Votes | % |
|---|---|---|---|
| Democratic | Lois Frankel | 171,021 | 54.63% |
| Republican | Adam Hasner | 142,050 | 45.37% |
| Total votes | | 313,071 | 100.00% |
| Democratic gain from Republican | | | |

=== 2014 ===
Florida 22nd Congressional District 2014
| Party | Candidate | Votes | % |
|---|---|---|---|
| Democratic | Lois Frankel (incumbent) | 125,404 | 58.03% |
| Republican | Paul Spain | 90,685 | 41.97% |
| No party | Others | 7 | 0.00% |
| Total votes | | 216,096 | 100.00% |
| Democratic hold | | | |

=== 2016 ===
Florida 22nd Congressional District 2016
| Party | Candidate | Votes | % |
|---|---|---|---|
| Democratic | Ted Deutch | 199,113 | 58.94% |
| Republican | Andrea McGee | 138,737 | 41.06% |
| Total votes | | 337,850 | 100.00% |
| Democratic hold | | | |

=== 2018 ===
Florida 22nd Congressional District 2018
| Party | Candidate | Votes | % |
|---|---|---|---|
| Democratic | Ted Deutch (incumbent) | 184,634 | 62.02% |
| Republican | Nicolas Kimaz | 113,049 | 37.98% |
| Total votes | | 297,683 | 100.00% |
| Democratic hold | | | |

=== 2020 ===
2020 United States House of Representatives elections in Florida
| Party | Candidate | Votes | % |
|---|---|---|---|
| Democratic | Ted Deutch (incumbent) | 235,764 | 58.60% |
| Republican | James Pruden | 166,553 | 41.39% |
| Total votes | | 402,317 | 100.00% |
| Democratic hold | | | |

=== 2022 ===
2022 United States House of Representatives elections in Florida
| Party | Candidate | Votes | % |
|---|---|---|---|
| Democratic | Lois Frankel (incumbent) | 150,010 | 55.11% |
| Republican | Dan Franzese | 122,194 | 44.89% |
| Total votes | | 272,204 | 100.00% |
| Democratic hold | | | |

=== 2024 ===
2024 United States House of Representatives elections in Florida
| Party | Candidate | Votes | % |
|---|---|---|---|
| Democratic | Lois Frankel (incumbent) | 201,608 | 54.96% |
| Republican | Dan Franzese | 165,248 | 45.04% |
| Total votes | | 366,856 | 100.00% |
| Democratic hold | | | |

=== 2026 ===
2026 United States House of Representatives elections in Florida
| Party | Candidate | Votes | % |
|---|---|---|---|
| Democratic | Pia Dandiya | 153,177 | 51.9% |
| Republican | Casey Askar | 141,939 | 48.1% |
| Total votes | | | |
