= List of municipalities in Florida =

Map of the United States with Florida highlighted

Florida Municipalities and Counties

Florida is a state located in the Southern United States. There are 267 cities, 123 towns, and 21 villages in the U.S. state of Florida, a total of 411 municipalities. They are distributed across 67 counties, in addition to 66 county governments. Jacksonville has the only consolidated city–county government in the state, so there is no Duval County government. However, smaller municipal governments exist within the consolidated municipality, e.g., Baldwin and the Jacksonville Beaches. All but two of Florida's county seats are municipalities (the exceptions are Crawfordville, county seat of rural Wakulla County; and East Naples, county seat of Collier County).

Municipalities in Florida may be called cities, towns, or villages, but there is no legal distinction between the different terms. As of the 2010 U.S. Census, more than 10 million Floridians, 55% of the state's total population of 18,801,310, lived in municipalities. The remainder lived in unincorporated areas. However, 92% of the population lives in urban areas, thus the actual number of residents living in truly rural areas is small. There are ten counties in the state with just one municipality and ten counties with only two.

In 1822, St. Augustine and Pensacola became the first municipalities to incorporate. The most recent incorporation was Indiantown in 2017. The largest municipality by population and land area is Jacksonville with 949,611 residents and 874.6 square miles (2,265 km^{2}). The smallest by population is Marineland with 15 people, while the smallest by land area is Lazy Lake at 0.022 square miles (0.057 km^{2}).

The formation and dissolution of municipalities is governed by Chapter 165 of the Florida Statutes. All Florida municipalities must be operated under a municipal charter approved by a majority of the registered voters in the geographic area of the municipality, which must be confirmed by the state legislature through special legislation.

The largest cities in Florida (population over 200,000) utilize the strong mayor–council form of government. The mayor typically appoints a chief administrative officer who performs the same function as a city manager which is utilized by 70% of Florida's municipalities, whose mayors are primarily symbolic and ceremonial.

== Incorporated cities, towns, and villages ==
Key
| † | County seat | # | State capital |

| Population Rank | Place name | County | Population (2020) | Land area | | Government | Label | Year Incorporated |
| Population Rank | Place name | County | Population (2020) | sq mi | km^{2} | Government | Label | Year Incorporated |
|---|---|---|---|---|---|---|---|---|
| 165 | Alachua | Alachua | 10,574 | 36.2 sq mi | 93.7 km^{2} | Commission–manager | City | 1905 |
| 370 | Alford | Jackson | 484 | 1.1 sq mi | 2.7 km^{2} | Mayor–council | Town | 1959 |
| 65 | Altamonte Springs | Seminole | 46,231 | 9.1 sq mi | 23.5 km^{2} | Commission–manager | City | 1920 |
| 369 | Altha | Calhoun | 496 | 1.3 sq mi | 3.5 km^{2} | Mayor–council | Town | 1946 |
| 329 | Anna Maria | Manatee | 968 | 0.74 sq mi | 1.9 km^{2} | Mayor–commission | City | 1923 |
| 278 | Apalachicola† | Franklin | 2,341 | 1.9 sq mi | 5.0 km^{2} | Mayor–commission | City | 1831 |
| 54 | Apopka | Orange | 54,873 | 34.6 sq mi | 89.5 km^{2} | Mayor–commission | City | 1882 |
| 187 | Arcadia† | DeSoto | 7,420 | 4.4 sq mi | 11.5 km^{2} | Mayor–council | City | 1886 |
| 325-T | Archer | Alachua | 1,140 | 6.4 sq mi | 16.5 km^{2} | Commission–manager | City | 1850 |
| 296 | Astatula | Lake | 1,889 | 3.1 sq mi | 8.1 km^{2} | Mayor–council | Town | 1927 |
| 147 | Atlantic Beach | Duval | 13,513 | 3.7 sq mi | 9.5 km^{2} | Commission–manager | City | 1926 |
| 285-T | Atlantis | Palm Beach | 2,142 | 1.4 sq mi | 3.5 km^{2} | Council–manager | City | 1959 |
| 138 | Auburndale | Polk | 15,616 | 13.6 sq mi | 35.1 km^{2} | Commission–manager | City | 1911 |
| 75 | Aventura | Miami-Dade | 40,242 | 2.6 sq mi | 6.9 km^{2} | Council–manager | City | 1995 |
| 172 | Avon Park | Highlands | 9,658 | 10.1 sq mi | 26.2 km^{2} | Council–manager | City | 1891 |
| 254 | Bal Harbour | Miami-Dade | 3,093 | 0.38 sq mi | 0.99 km^{2} | Council–manager | Village | 1946 |
| 317 | Baldwin | Duval | 1,396 | 2.0 sq mi | 5.2 km^{2} | Mayor–council | Town | 1876 |
| 116 | Bartow† | Polk | 19,309 | 46.3 sq mi | 120.0 km^{2} | Commission–manager | City | 1882 |
| 405 | Bascom | Jackson | 87 | 0.24 sq mi | 0.62 km^{2} | Mayor–council | Town | 1961 |
| 210 | Bay Harbor Islands | Miami-Dade | 5,922 | 0.40 sq mi | 1.0 km^{2} | Council–manager | Town | 1947 |
| 409 | Bay Lake | Orange | 29 | 21.5 sq mi | 55.7 km^{2} | Council–manager | City | 1967 |
| 365 | Bell | Gilchrist | 518 | 1.6 sq mi | 4.2 km^{2} | Council–manager | Town | 1903 |
| 129 | Belle Glade | Palm Beach | 16,698 | 7.0 sq mi | 18.1 km^{2} | Council–manager | City | 1928 |
| 195 | Belle Isle | Orange | 7,032 | 2.4 sq mi | 6.2 km^{2} | Council–manager | City | 1924 |
| 233 | Belleair | Pinellas | 4,273 | 1.7 sq mi | 4.5 km^{2} | Council–manager | Town | 1924 |
| 306 | Belleair Beach | Pinellas | 1,633 | 0.48 sq mi | 1.2 km^{2} | Council–manager | City | 1950 |
| 280 | Belleair Bluffs | Pinellas | 2,311 | 0.46 sq mi | 1.2 km^{2} | Mayor–commission | City | 1963 |
| 407 | Belleair Shore | Pinellas | 73 | 0.06 sq mi | 0.15 km^{2} | Mayor–commission | Town | 1955 |
| 217 | Belleview | Marion | 5,413 | 3.9 sq mi | 10.1 km^{2} | Mayor–commission | City | 1885 |
| 371 | Beverly Beach | Flagler | 474 | 0.34 sq mi | 0.87 km^{2} | Mayor–commission | Town | 1955 |
| 253 | Biscayne Park | Miami-Dade | 3,117 | 0.62 sq mi | 1.6 km^{2} | Commission–manager | Village | 1933 |
| 281 | Blountstown† | Calhoun | 2,266 | 3.2 sq mi | 8.3 km^{2} | Council–manager | City | 1903 |
| 23 | Boca Raton | Palm Beach | 97,422 | 29.2 sq mi | 75.6 km^{2} | Council–manager | City | 1925 |
| 267 | Bonifay† | Holmes | 2,759 | 4.7 sq mi | 12.2 km^{2} | Mayor–council | City | 1886 |
| 57 | Bonita Springs | Lee | 53,644 | 38.4 sq mi | 99.5 km^{2} | Council–manager | City | 1999 |
| 273 | Bowling Green | Hardee | 2,405 | 1.3 sq mi | 3.3 km^{2} | Commission–manager | City | 1927 |
| 34 | Boynton Beach | Palm Beach | 80,380 | 16.2 sq mi | 41.8 km^{2} | Commission–manager | City | 1907 |
| 53 | Bradenton† | Manatee | 55,698 | 14.3 sq mi | 37.2 km^{2} | Mayor–council | City | 1903 |
| 333 | Bradenton Beach | Manatee | 908 | 0.52 sq mi | 1.3 km^{2} | Mayor–commission | City | 1952 |
| 351 | Branford | Suwannee | 711 | 1.1 sq mi | 2.9 km^{2} | Mayor–council | Town | 1961 |
| 368 | Briny Breezes | Palm Beach | 502 | 0.06 sq mi | 0.15 km^{2} | Council-manager | Town | 1963 |
| 331 | Bristol† | Liberty | 918 | 1.6 sq mi | 4.2 km^{2} | Mayor–council | City | 1958 |
| 325-T | Bronson† | Levy | 1,140 | 4.3 sq mi | 11.1 km^{2} | Mayor–council | Town | 1951 |
| 386 | Brooker | Bradford | 322 | 0.53 sq mi | 1.4 km^{2} | Mayor–council | Town | 1952 |
| 178 | Brooksville† | Hernando | 8,890 | 11.2 sq mi | 29.1 km^{2} | Council–manager | City | 1856 |
| 250 | Bunnell† | Flagler | 3,276 | 139.8 sq mi | 362.0 km^{2} | Commission–manager | City | 1913 |
| 256 | Bushnell† | Sumter | 3,047 | 12.4 sq mi | 32.2 km^{2} | Council–manager | City | 1911 |
| 310 | Callahan | Nassau | 1,526 | 1.8 sq mi | 4.7 km^{2} | Commission–manager | Town | 1911 |
| 152 | Callaway | Bay | 13,045 | 9.4 sq mi | 24.4 km^{2} | Commission–manager | City | 1996 |
| 401 | Campbellton | Jackson | 191 | 2.6 sq mi | 6.7 km^{2} | Mayor–council | Town | 1925 |
| 169 | Cape Canaveral | Brevard | 9,972 | 2.2 sq mi | 5.8 km^{2} | Council–manager | City | 1963 |
| 9 | Cape Coral | Lee | 194,016 | 106.0 sq mi | 274.6 km^{2} | Council–manager | City | 1970 |
| 271 | Carrabelle | Franklin | 2,606 | 4.8 sq mi | 12.4 km^{2} | Commission–manager | City | 1893 |
| 388-T | Caryville | Washington | 301 | 3.0 sq mi | 7.8 km^{2} | Chair-council | Town | 1965 |
| 92 | Casselberry | Seminole | 28,794 | 7.0 sq mi | 18.0 km^{2} | Commission–manager | City | 1940 |
| 352 | Cedar Key | Levy | 687 | 1.0 sq mi | 2.6 km^{2} | Mayor–commission | City | 1923 |
| 338 | Center Hill | Sumter | 846 | 6.1 sq mi | 15.8 km^{2} | Mayor–council | City | 1925 |
| 299 | Century | Escambia | 1,713 | 3.2 sq mi | 8.3 km^{2} | Mayor–council | Town | 1945 |
| 263 | Chattahoochee | Gadsden | 2,955 | 5.6 sq mi | 14.5 km^{2} | Council–manager | City | 1921 |
| 279 | Chiefland | Levy | 2,316 | 6.8 sq mi | 17.5 km^{2} | Commission–manager | City | 1913 |
| 241 | Chipley† | Washington | 3,660 | 4.2 sq mi | 11.0 km^{2} | Mayor–council | City | 1901 |
| 375 | Cinco Bayou | Okaloosa | 457 | 0.17 sq mi | 0.44 km^{2} | Council–manager | Town | 1950 |
| 18 | Clearwater† | Pinellas | 117,292 | 26.1 sq mi | 67.6 km^{2} | Council–manager | City | 1891 |
| 72 | Clermont | Lake | 43,021 | 18.0 sq mi | 46.6 km^{2} | Council–manager | City | 1916 |
| 189 | Clewiston | Hendry | 7,327 | 4.5 sq mi | 11.7 km^{2} | Commission–manager | City | 1925 |
| 403 | Cloud Lake | Palm Beach | 134 | 0.05 sq mi | 0.14 km^{2} | Mayor–council | Town | 1948 |
| 118 | Cocoa | Brevard | 19,041 | 13.5 sq mi | 34.9 km^{2} | Commission–manager | City | 1895 |
| 162 | Cocoa Beach | Brevard | 11,354 | 4.7 sq mi | 12.1 km^{2} | Commission–manager | City | 1925 |
| 52 | Coconut Creek | Broward | 57,833 | 11.2 sq mi | 28.9 km^{2} | Commission–manager | City | 1967 |
| 355 | Coleman | Sumter | 642 | 2.2 sq mi | 5.8 km^{2} | Mayor–council | City | 1908 |
| 86 | Cooper City | Broward | 34,401 | 8.0 sq mi | 20.8 km^{2} | Commission–manager | City | 1959 |
| 59 | Coral Gables | Miami-Dade | 49,248 | 12.9 sq mi | 33.5 km^{2} | Commission–manager | City | 1925 |
| 15 | Coral Springs | Broward | 134,394 | 22.9 sq mi | 59.2 km^{2} | Commission–manager | City | 1963 |
| 337 | Cottondale | Jackson | 848 | 3.3 sq mi | 8.5 km^{2} | Mayor–commission | Town | 1905 |
| 304 | Crescent City | Putnam | 1,654 | 2.1 sq mi | 5.3 km^{2} | Commission–manager | City | 1883 |
| 94 | Crestview† | Okaloosa | 27,134 | 16.6 sq mi | 42.9 km^{2} | Council-manager | City | 1916 |
| 302 | Cross City† | Dixie | 1,689 | 1.8 sq mi | 4.8 km^{2} | Council–manager | Town | 1924 |
| 246 | Crystal River | Citrus | 3,396 | 7.5 sq mi | 19.4 km^{2} | Council–manager | City | 1903 |
| 66 | Cutler Bay | Miami-Dade | 45,425 | 9.9 sq mi | 25.6 km^{2} | Commission–manager | Town | 2005 |
| 191 | Dade City† | Pasco | 7,275 | 6.2 sq mi | 16.0 km^{2} | Commission–manager | City | 1889 |
| 88 | Dania Beach | Broward | 31,723 | 7.8 sq mi | 20.2 km^{2} | Commission–manager | City | 1904 |
| 176 | Davenport | Polk | 9,043 | 3.7 sq mi | 9.7 km^{2} | Commission–manager | City | 1915 |
| 22 | Davie | Broward | 105,691 | 34.9 sq mi | 90.4 km^{2} | Commission–manager | Town | 1925 |
| 39 | Daytona Beach | Volusia | 72,647 | 65.6 sq mi | 169.9 km^{2} | Commission–manager | City | 1876 |
| 221 | Daytona Beach Shores | Volusia | 5,179 | 0.85 sq mi | 2.2 km^{2} | Council–manager | City | 1960 |
| 110 | DeBary | Volusia | 22,260 | 19.0 sq mi | 49.1 km^{2} | Council–manager | City | 1993 |
| 28 | Deerfield Beach | Broward | 86,859 | 14.9 sq mi | 38.7 km^{2} | Commission–manager | City | 1925 |
| 211 | DeFuniak Springs† | Walton | 5,919 | 14.0 sq mi | 36.1 km^{2} | Council–manager | City | 1901 |
| 81 | DeLand† | Volusia | 37,351 | 19.0 sq mi | 49.3 km^{2} | Commission–manager | City | 1882 |
| 42 | Delray Beach | Palm Beach | 66,846 | 15.9 sq mi | 41.2 km^{2} | Commission–manager | City | 1911 |
| 25 | Deltona | Volusia | 93,692 | 37.3 sq mi | 96.7 km^{2} | Commission–manager | City | 1995 |
| 144 | Destin | Okaloosa | 13,931 | 7.7 sq mi | 20.0 km^{2} | Council–manager | City | 1984 |
| 36 | Doral | Miami-Dade | 75,874 | 13.8 sq mi | 35.8 km^{2} | Council–manager | City | 2003 |
| 220 | Dundee | Polk | 5,235 | 10.5 sq mi | 27.2 km^{2} | Council–manager | Town | 1925 |
| 83 | Dunedin | Pinellas | 36,068 | 10.4 sq mi | 27.0 km^{2} | Commission–manager | City | 1899 |
| 295 | Dunnellon | Marion | 1,928 | 8.8 sq mi | 22.8 km^{2} | Council–manager | City | 1891 |
| 260 | Eagle Lake | Polk | 3,008 | 2.0 sq mi | 5.1 km^{2} | Commission–manager | City | 1921 |
| 277 | Eatonville | Orange | 2,349 | 0.99 sq mi | 2.6 km^{2} | Mayor–council | Town | 1887 |
| 395 | Ebro | Washington | 237 | 4.7 sq mi | 12.2 km^{2} | Mayor–council | Town | 1967 |
| 107 | Edgewater | Volusia | 23,097 | 24.6 sq mi | 63.7 km^{2} | Council–manager | City | 1924 |
| 270 | Edgewood | Orange | 2,685 | 1.2 sq mi | 3.2 km^{2} | Mayor–council | City | 1924 |
| 291-T | El Portal | Miami-Dade | 1,986 | 0.42 sq mi | 1.1 km^{2} | Council–manager | Village | 1937 |
| 82 | Estero | Lee | 36,939 | 24.4 sq mi | 63.1 km^{2} | Council-manager | Village | 2014 |
| 385 | Esto | Holmes | 341 | 2.2 sq mi | 5.6 km^{2} | President-council | Town | 1963 |
| 106 | Eustis | Lake | 23,189 | 10.9 sq mi | 28.3 km^{2} | Council–manager | City | 1883 |
| 384 | Everglades City | Collier | 352 | 0.92 sq mi | 2.4 km^{2} | Mayor–council | City | 1953 |
| 324 | Fanning Springs | Levy; Gilchrist | 1,182 | 4.9 sq mi | 12.6 km^{2} | Mayor–council | City | 1965 |
| 228 | Fellsmere | Indian River | 4,834 | 57.6 sq mi | 149.1 km^{2} | Council–manager | City | 1911 |
| 151 | Fernandina Beach† | Nassau | 13,052 | 11.8 sq mi | 30.6 km^{2} | Commission–manager | City | 1825 |
| 222 | Flagler Beach | Flagler | 5,160 | 3.6 sq mi | 9.3 km^{2} | Commission–manager | City | 1925 |
| 150 | Florida City | Miami-Dade | 13,085 | 6.0 sq mi | 15.5 km^{2} | Mayor–commission | City | 1914 |
| 10 | Fort Lauderdale† | Broward | 182,760 | 34.6 sq mi | 89.6 km^{2} | Commission–manager | City | 1911 |
| 223 | Fort Meade | Polk | 5,100 | 8.2 sq mi | 21.2 km^{2} | Commission–manager | City | 1885 |
| 29 | Fort Myers† | Lee | 86,395 | 39.8 sq mi | 103.2 km^{2} | Council–manager | City | 1886 |
| 215 | Fort Myers Beach | Lee | 5,582 | 2.8 sq mi | 7.2 km^{2} | Council–manager | Town | 1995 |
| 62 | Fort Pierce† | St. Lucie | 47,297 | 23.8 sq mi | 61.6 km^{2} | Commission–manager | City | 1901 |
| 111 | Fort Walton Beach | Okaloosa | 20,922 | 7.6 sq mi | 19.8 km^{2} | Council–manager | City | 1941 |
| 357 | Fort White | Columbia | 618 | 2.4 sq mi | 6.3 km^{2} | Mayor–council | Town | 1884 |
| 212 | Freeport | Walton | 5,861 | 18.9 sq mi | 49.1 km^{2} | Mayor–council | City | 1963 |
| 251 | Frostproof | Polk | 3,273 | 10.7 sq mi | 27.8 km^{2} | Council–manager | City | 1921 |
| 180 | Fruitland Park | Lake | 8,325 | 7.0 sq mi | 18.0 km^{2} | Commission–manager | City | 1927 |
| 13 | Gainesville† | Alachua | 141,085 | 63.2 sq mi | 163.6 km^{2} | Commission–manager | City | 1869 |
| 397-T | Glen Ridge | Palm Beach | 217 | 0.17 sq mi | 0.44 km^{2} | Council–manager | Town | 1947 |
| 372-T | Glen St. Mary | Baker | 463 | 0.46 sq mi | 1.2 km^{2} | Mayor–council | Town | 1957 |
| 330 | Golden Beach | Miami-Dade | 961 | 0.33 sq mi | 0.84 km^{2} | Council–manager | Town | 1929 |
| 393 | Golf | Palm Beach | 255 | 0.82 sq mi | 2.1 km^{2} | Council–manager | Village | 1957 |
| 284 | Graceville | Jackson | 2,153 | 4.3 sq mi | 11.2 km^{2} | Commission–manager | City | 1902 |
| 335 | Grand Ridge | Jackson | 882 | 4.3 sq mi | 11.3 km^{2} | Council–manager | Town | 1951 |
| 230 | Grant-Valkaria | Brevard | 4,509 | 27.2 sq mi | 70.5 km^{2} | Mayor–council | Town | 2006 |
| 170 | Green Cove Springs† | Clay | 9,786 | 7.5 sq mi | 19.5 km^{2} | Council–manager | City | 1874 |
| 69 | Greenacres | Palm Beach | 43,990 | 5.9 sq mi | 15.4 km^{2} | Council–manager | City | 1926 |
| 374 | Greensboro | Gadsden | 461 | 2.3 sq mi | 5.9 km^{2} | Mayor–council | Town | 1911 |
| 346 | Greenville | Madison | 746 | 1.3 sq mi | 3.4 km^{2} | Mayor–council | Town | 1907 |
| 363 | Greenwood | Jackson | 539 | 4.6 sq mi | 11.8 km^{2} | Mayor–council | Town | 1927 |
| 319 | Gretna | Gadsden | 1,357 | 8.6 sq mi | 22.2 km^{2} | Commission–manager | City | 1909 |
| 121 | Groveland | Lake | 18,505 | 19.7 sq mi | 50.9 km^{2} | Council–manager | City | 1922 |
| 204 | Gulf Breeze | Santa Rosa | 6,302 | 4.7 sq mi | 12.1 km^{2} | Council–manager | City | 1961 |
| 336 | Gulf Stream | Palm Beach | 880 | 0.79 sq mi | 2.0 km^{2} | Commission–manager | Town | 1925 |
| 158 | Gulfport | Pinellas | 11,783 | 2.8 sq mi | 7.2 km^{2} | Council–manager | City | 1910 |
| 98 | Haines City | Polk | 26,669 | 18.8 sq mi | 48.6 km^{2} | Council–manager | City | 1914 |
| 74 | Hallandale Beach | Broward | 41,217 | 4.2 sq mi | 10.9 km^{2} | Commission–manager | City | 1927 |
| 377 | Hampton | Bradford | 432 | 1.1 sq mi | 2.7 km^{2} | Mayor–council | City | 1870 |
| 300 | Havana | Gadsden | 1,707 | 2.8 sq mi | 7.2 km^{2} | Council–manager | Town | 1906 |
| 282 | Haverhill | Palm Beach | 2,187 | 0.63 sq mi | 1.6 km^{2} | Council–manager | Town | 1950 |
| 312 | Hawthorne | Alachua | 1,478 | 7.4 sq mi | 19.1 km^{2} | Commission–manager | City | 1881 |
| 6 | Hialeah | Miami-Dade | 223,109 | 21.6 sq mi | 55.9 km^{2} | Mayor–council | City | 1925 |
| 108 | Hialeah Gardens | Miami-Dade | 23,068 | 3.2 sq mi | 8.3 km^{2} | Mayor–council | City | 1948 |
| 207 | High Springs | Alachua | 6,215 | 21.8 sq mi | 56.4 km^{2} | Commission–manager | City | 1892 |
| 231 | Highland Beach | Palm Beach | 4,295 | 0.54 sq mi | 1.4 km^{2} | Commission–manager | Town | 1949 |
| 391 | Highland Park | Polk | 264 | 0.55 sq mi | 1.4 km^{2} | Mayor–commission | Village | 1927 |
| 394 | Hillcrest Heights | Polk | 243 | 0.16 sq mi | 0.41 km^{2} | Mayor–commission | Town | 1923 |
| 262 | Hilliard | Nassau | 2,967 | 5.5 sq mi | 14.3 km^{2} | Mayor–council | Town | 1947 |
| 290 | Hillsboro Beach | Broward | 1,987 | 0.37 sq mi | 0.95 km^{2} | Mayor–commission | Town | 1939 |
| 153 | Holly Hill | Volusia | 12,958 | 4.0 sq mi | 10.3 km^{2} | Commission–manager | City | 1901 |
| 12 | Hollywood | Broward | 153,067 | 27.3 sq mi | 70.6 km^{2} | Commission–manager | City | 1925 |
| 258-T | Holmes Beach | Manatee | 3,010 | 1.7 sq mi | 4.3 km^{2} | Mayor–commission | City | 1950 |
| 33 | Homestead | Miami-Dade | 80,737 | 15.1 sq mi | 39.1 km^{2} | Council–manager | City | 1913 |
| 402 | Horseshoe Beach | Dixie | 165 | 0.47 sq mi | 1.2 km^{2} | Mayor–council | Town | 1963 |
| 305 | Howey-in-the-Hills | Lake | 1,643 | 3.2 sq mi | 8.2 km^{2} | Council-manager | Town | 1925 |
| 269 | Hypoluxo | Palm Beach | 2,687 | 0.57 sq mi | 1.5 km^{2} | Mayor–council | Town | 1955 |
| 258-T | Indialantic | Brevard | 3,010 | 0.97 sq mi | 2.5 km^{2} | Council–manager | Town | 1952 |
| 406 | Indian Creek | Miami-Dade | 84 | 0.43 sq mi | 1.1 km^{2} | Council–manager | Village | 1939 |
| 177 | Indian Harbour Beach | Brevard | 9,019 | 2.1 sq mi | 5.4 km^{2} | Council–manager | City | 1955 |
| 234 | Indian River Shores | Indian River | 4,241 | 5.1 sq mi | 13.3 km^{2} | Council–manager | Town | 1953 |
| 232 | Indian Rocks Beach | Pinellas | 4,286 | 0.85 sq mi | 2.2 km^{2} | Commission–manager | City | 1956 |
| 323 | Indian Shores | Pinellas | 1,190 | 0.33 sq mi | 0.87 km^{2} | Mayor–council | Town | 1949 |
| 201 | Indiantown | Martin | 6,560 | 14.2 sq mi | 36.7 km^{2} | Mayor–council | Village | 2017 |
| 313 | Inglis | Levy | 1,476 | 3.4 sq mi | 8.8 km^{2} | Mayor–commission | Town | 1956 |
| 316 | Interlachen | Putnam | 1,441 | 6.1 sq mi | 15.8 km^{2} | Mayor–council | Town | 1888 |
| 185 | Inverness† | Citrus | 7,543 | 8.3 sq mi | 21.6 km^{2} | Council–manager | City | 1919 |
| 194 | Islamorada | Monroe | 7,107 | 6.4 sq mi | 16.7 km^{2} | Council–manager | Village | 1997 |
| 1 | Jacksonville† | Duval | 949,611 | 747.3 sq mi | 1,935.5 km^{2} | Mayor–council | City | 1832 |
| 105 | Jacksonville Beach | Duval | 23,830 | 7.3 sq mi | 19.0 km^{2} | Council–manager | City | 1907 |
| 397-T | Jacob City | Jackson | 217 | 3.0 sq mi | 7.9 km^{2} | Council–manager | City | 1983 |
| 242 | Jasper† | Hamilton | 3,621 | 2.4 sq mi | 6.3 km^{2} | Council–manager | City | 1858 |
| 364 | Jay | Santa Rosa | 524 | 1.7 sq mi | 4.3 km^{2} | Mayor–council | Town | 1951 |
| 345 | Jennings | Hamilton | 749 | 2.7 sq mi | 6.9 km^{2} | Council–manager | Town | 1900 |
| 239 | Juno Beach | Palm Beach | 3,858 | 2.0 sq mi | 5.3 km^{2} | Council–manager | Town | 1953 |
| 47 | Jupiter | Palm Beach | 61,047 | 21.6 sq mi | 56.0 km^{2} | Council–manager | Town | 1925 |
| 380 | Jupiter Inlet Colony | Palm Beach | 405 | 0.16 sq mi | 0.40 km^{2} | Mayor–commission | Town | 1959 |
| 341 | Jupiter Island | Martin | 804 | 2.7 sq mi | 7.0 km^{2} | Commission–manager | Town | 1953 |
| 224 | Kenneth City | Pinellas | 5,047 | 0.71 sq mi | 1.8 km^{2} | Council-manager | Town | 1957 |
| 142 | Key Biscayne | Miami-Dade | 14,809 | 1.2 sq mi | 3.2 km^{2} | Council–manager | Village | 1991 |
| 342 | Key Colony Beach | Monroe | 790 | 0.44 sq mi | 1.1 km^{2} | Mayor–commission | City | 1957 |
| 99 | Key West† | Monroe | 26,444 | 5.6 sq mi | 14.5 km^{2} | Commission–manager | City | 1828 |
| 315 | Keystone Heights | Clay | 1,446 | 1.1 sq mi | 2.8 km^{2} | Council–manager | City | 1925 |
| 35 | Kissimmee† | Osceola | 79,226 | 21.5 sq mi | 55.7 km^{2} | Commission–manager | City | 1883 |
| 225 | LaBelle† | Hendry | 4,966 | 14.5 sq mi | 37.5 km^{2} | Mayor–commission | City | 1925 |
| 387 | LaCrosse | Alachua | 316 | 4.6 sq mi | 12.0 km^{2} | Mayor–council | Town | 1957 |
| 134 | Lady Lake | Lake | 15,970 | 8.3 sq mi | 21.5 km^{2} | Commission–manager | Town | 1883 |
| 203 | Lake Alfred | Polk | 6,374 | 9.3 sq mi | 24.0 km^{2} | Commission–manager | City | 1915 |
| 410 | Lake Buena Vista | Orange | 24 | 3.0 sq mi | 7.8 km^{2} | Council–manager | City | 1967 |
| 291-T | Lake Butler† | Union | 1,986 | 2.3 sq mi | 6.0 km^{2} | Commission–manager | City | 1893 |
| 156 | Lake City† | Columbia | 12,329 | 11.8 sq mi | 30.7 km^{2} | Council–manager | City | 1859 |
| 243 | Lake Clarke Shores | Palm Beach | 3,564 | 0.92 sq mi | 2.4 km^{2} | Mayor–council | Town | 1957 |
| 309 | Lake Hamilton | Polk | 1,537 | 3.1 sq mi | 8.1 km^{2} | Mayor–council | Town | 1925 |
| 266 | Lake Helen | Volusia | 2,842 | 4.6 sq mi | 11.8 km^{2} | Commission-manager | City | 1888 |
| 127 | Lake Mary | Seminole | 16,798 | 9.1 sq mi | 23.5 km^{2} | Commission–manager | City | 1973 |
| 175 | Lake Park | Palm Beach | 9,047 | 2.1 sq mi | 5.4 km^{2} | Commission–manager | Town | 1921 |
| 276 | Lake Placid | Highlands | 2,360 | 4.7 sq mi | 12.0 km^{2} | Mayor–council | Town | 1927 |
| 131 | Lake Wales | Polk | 16,361 | 18.8 sq mi | 48.8 km^{2} | Commission–manager | City | 1917 |
| 73 | Lake Worth Beach | Palm Beach | 42,219 | 5.9 sq mi | 15.3 km^{2} | Commission–manager | City | 1912 |
| 19 | Lakeland | Polk | 112,641 | 66.2 sq mi | 171.3 km^{2} | Commission–manager | City | 1885 |
| 160 | Lantana | Palm Beach | 11,504 | 2.4 sq mi | 6.1 km^{2} | Council–manager | Town | 1921 |
| 32 | Largo | Pinellas | 82,485 | 18.5 sq mi | 48.0 km^{2} | Commission–manager | City | 1905 |
| 84 | Lauderdale Lakes | Broward | 35,954 | 3.7 sq mi | 9.5 km^{2} | Commission–manager | City | 1961 |
| 208 | Lauderdale-by-the-Sea | Broward | 6,198 | 0.88 sq mi | 2.3 km^{2} | Commission–manager | Town | 1924 |
| 38 | Lauderhill | Broward | 74,482 | 8.5 sq mi | 22.1 km^{2} | Commission–manager | City | 1959 |
| 360 | Laurel Hill | Okaloosa | 584 | 4.2 sq mi | 10.9 km^{2} | Mayor–council | City | 1905 |
| 356 | Lawtey | Bradford | 636 | 1.5 sq mi | 3.9 km^{2} | Mayor–council | City | 1905 |
| 399 | Layton | Monroe | 210 | 0.16 sq mi | 0.42 km^{2} | Mayor–council | City | 1963 |
| 408 | Lazy Lake | Broward | 33 | 0.02 sq mi | 0.06 km^{2} | Mayor–council | Village | 1953 |
| 382 | Lee | Madison | 375 | 2.4 sq mi | 6.3 km^{2} | Council–manager | Town | 1909 |
| 95 | Leesburg | Lake | 27,000 | 38.4 sq mi | 99.6 km^{2} | Commission–manager | City | 1875 |
| 166 | Lighthouse Point | Broward | 10,486 | 2.3 sq mi | 6.0 km^{2} | Mayor–commission | City | 1956 |
| 198 | Live Oak† | Suwannee | 6,735 | 7.6 sq mi | 19.8 km^{2} | Mayor–council | City | 1878 |
| 186 | Longboat Key | Manatee; Sarasota | 7,505 | 4.1 sq mi | 10.6 km^{2} | Commission–manager | Town | 1955 |
| 140 | Longwood | Seminole | 15,087 | 5.5 sq mi | 14.2 km^{2} | Mayor–commission | City | 1875 |
| 249 | Loxahatchee Groves | Palm Beach | 3,355 | 12.5 sq mi | 32.4 km^{2} | Council–manager | Town | 2006 |
| 120 | Lynn Haven | Bay | 18,695 | 10.5 sq mi | 27.1 km^{2} | Commission–manager | City | 1913 |
| 190 | Macclenny† | Baker | 7,304 | 4.9 sq mi | 12.6 km^{2} | Commission–manager | City | 1939 |
| 237 | Madeira Beach | Pinellas | 3,895 | 0.98 sq mi | 2.5 km^{2} | Commission–manager | City | 1947 |
| 265 | Madison† | Madison | 2,912 | 2.6 sq mi | 6.8 km^{2} | Commission–manager | City | 1945 |
| 112 | Maitland | Orange | 19,543 | 5.4 sq mi | 13.9 km^{2} | Council–manager | City | 1885 |
| 264 | Malabar | Brevard | 2,949 | 10.7 sq mi | 27.7 km^{2} | Mayor–council | Town | 1962 |
| 294 | Malone | Jackson | 1,959 | 3.0 sq mi | 7.9 km^{2} | Mayor–council | Town | 1911 |
| 379 | Manalapan | Palm Beach | 419 | 0.45 sq mi | 1.2 km^{2} | Commission–manager | Town | 1931 |
| 285-T | Mangonia Park | Palm Beach | 2,142 | 0.75 sq mi | 1.9 km^{2} | Council–manager | Town | 1947 |
| 171 | Marathon | Monroe | 9,689 | 8.4 sq mi | 21.9 km^{2} | Council–manager | City | 1999 |
| 136 | Marco Island | Collier | 15,760 | 12.2 sq mi | 31.5 km^{2} | Council–manager | City | 1997 |
| 51 | Margate | Broward | 58,712 | 8.8 sq mi | 22.7 km^{2} | Commission–manager | City | 1955 |
| 206 | Marianna† | Jackson | 6,245 | 18.6 sq mi | 48.2 km^{2} | Commission–manager | City | 1825 |
| 411 | Marineland | Flagler; St. Johns | 15 | 0.21 sq mi | 0.55 km^{2} | Commission–manager | Town | 1940 |
| 236 | Mary Esther | Okaloosa | 3,982 | 1.5 sq mi | 3.8 km^{2} | Council–manager | City | 1946 |
| 199 | Mascotte | Lake | 6,609 | 12.4 sq mi | 32.1 km^{2} | Council–manager | City | 1925 |
| 328 | Mayo† | Lafayette | 1,055 | 0.90 sq mi | 2.3 km^{2} | Mayor–council | Town | 1903 |
| 372-T | McIntosh | Marion | 463 | 0.71 sq mi | 1.8 km^{2} | Council–manager | Town | 1913 |
| 327 | Medley | Miami-Dade | 1,056 | 5.1 sq mi | 13.2 km^{2} | Mayor–council | Town | 1949 |
| 30 | Melbourne | Brevard | 84,678 | 44.1 sq mi | 114.3 km^{2} | Council–manager | City | 1888 |
| 252 | Melbourne Beach | Brevard | 3,231 | 0.99 sq mi | 2.6 km^{2} | Commission–manager | Town | 1923 |
| 353 | Melbourne Village | Brevard | 681 | 0.58 sq mi | 1.5 km^{2} | Mayor–commission | Town | 1957 |
| 332 | Mexico Beach | Bay | 916 | 2.3 sq mi | 5.9 km^{2} | Council–manager | City | 1967 |
| 2 | Miami† | Miami-Dade | 442,241 | 36.0 sq mi | 93.2 km^{2} | Mayor–commission | City | 1896 |
| 31 | Miami Beach | Miami-Dade | 82,890 | 7.7 sq mi | 19.9 km^{2} | Commission–manager | City | 1915 |
| 21 | Miami Gardens | Miami-Dade | 111,640 | 18.2 sq mi | 47.2 km^{2} | Council–manager | City | 2003 |
| 89 | Miami Lakes | Miami-Dade | 30,467 | 5.7 sq mi | 14.7 km^{2} | Council–manager | Town | 2000 |
| 159 | Miami Shores | Miami-Dade | 11,567 | 2.5 sq mi | 6.4 km^{2} | Council–manager | Village | 1932 |
| 145 | Miami Springs | Miami-Dade | 13,859 | 2.9 sq mi | 7.5 km^{2} | Council–manager | City | 1926 |
| 354 | Micanopy | Alachua | 648 | 1.0 sq mi | 2.7 km^{2} | Mayor–commission | Town | 1837 |
| 244 | Midway | Gadsden | 3,537 | 9.6 sq mi | 24.9 km^{2} | Council–manager | City | 1986 |
| 168 | Milton† | Santa Rosa | 10,197 | 5.6 sq mi | 14.4 km^{2} | Council–manager | City | 1844 |
| 146 | Minneola | Lake | 13,843 | 11.1 sq mi | 28.8 km^{2} | Council–manager | City | 1926 |
| 14 | Miramar | Broward | 134,721 | 28.9 sq mi | 74.7 km^{2} | Commission–manager | City | 1955 |
| 272 | Monticello† | Jefferson | 2,589 | 4.0 sq mi | 10.4 km^{2} | Council–manager | City | 1859 |
| 303 | Montverde | Lake | 1,655 | 1.7 sq mi | 4.3 km^{2} | Mayor–council | Town | 1925 |
| 307 | Moore Haven† | Glades | 1,566 | 1.1 sq mi | 2.8 km^{2} | Council–manager | City | 1917 |
| 133 | Mount Dora | Lake | 16,341 | 8.0 sq mi | 20.8 km^{2} | Council–manager | City | 1910 |
| 237 | Mulberry | Polk | 3,952 | 6.2 sq mi | 16.0 km^{2} | Commission–manager | City | 1901 |
| 117 | Naples | Collier | 19,115 | 12.3 sq mi | 31.9 km^{2} | Council–manager | City | 1925 |
| 193 | Neptune Beach | Duval | 7,217 | 2.3 sq mi | 6.1 km^{2} | Council–manager | City | 1931 |
| 128 | New Port Richey | Pasco | 16,728 | 4.5 sq mi | 11.8 km^{2} | Council–manager | City | 1924 |
| 90 | New Smyrna Beach | Volusia | 30,142 | 37.7 sq mi | 97.7 km^{2} | Commission–manager | City | 1887 |
| 188 | Newberry | Alachua | 7,342 | 57.6 sq mi | 149.2 km^{2} | Commission–manager | City | 1908 |
| 135 | Niceville | Okaloosa | 15,772 | 13.1 sq mi | 33.8 km^{2} | Council–manager | City | 1938 |
| 400 | Noma | Holmes | 208 | 1.1 sq mi | 2.8 km^{2} | Mayor–council | Town | 1977 |
| 181 | North Bay Village | Miami-Dade | 8,159 | 0.37 sq mi | 0.96 km^{2} | Commission–manager | City | 1945 |
| 67 | North Lauderdale | Broward | 44,794 | 4.6 sq mi | 12.0 km^{2} | Commission–manager | City | 1963 |
| 48 | North Miami | Miami-Dade | 60,191 | 8.4 sq mi | 21.8 km^{2} | Council–manager | City | 1926 |
| 70 | North Miami Beach | Miami-Dade | 43,676 | 4.8 sq mi | 12.5 km^{2} | Council–manager | City | 1926 |
| 149 | North Palm Beach | Palm Beach | 13,162 | 3.3 sq mi | 8.5 km^{2} | Council–manager | Village | 1956 |
| 37 | North Port | Sarasota | 74,793 | 99.4 sq mi | 257.4 km^{2} | Commission–manager | City | 1959 |
| 311 | North Redington Beach | Pinellas | 1,495 | 0.26 sq mi | 0.68 km^{2} | Mayor–commission | Town | 1953 |
| 291-T | Oak Hill | Volusia | 1,986 | 6.7 sq mi | 17.4 km^{2} | Mayor–commission | City | 1927 |
| 245 | Oakland | Orange | 3,516 | 2.3 sq mi | 6.0 km^{2} | Commission–manager | Town | 1887 |
| 68 | Oakland Park | Broward | 44,229 | 7.5 sq mi | 19.5 km^{2} | Commission–manager | City | 1929 |
| 43 | Ocala† | Marion | 63,591 | 47.3 sq mi | 122.4 km^{2} | Council–manager | City | 1869 |
| 388-T | Ocean Breeze | Martin | 301 | 0.17 sq mi | 0.43 km^{2} | Council–manager | Town | 1960 |
| 297 | Ocean Ridge | Palm Beach | 1,830 | 0.76 sq mi | 2.0 km^{2} | Commission–manager | Town | 1931 |
| 63 | Ocoee | Orange | 47,295 | 15.6 sq mi | 40.4 km^{2} | Commission–manager | City | 1923 |
| 219 | Okeechobee† | Okeechobee | 5,254 | 4.1 sq mi | 10.5 km^{2} | Mayor–council | City | 1915 |
| 141 | Oldsmar | Pinellas | 14,898 | 8.9 sq mi | 23.2 km^{2} | Council–manager | City | 1936 |
| 130 | Opa-locka | Miami-Dade | 16,463 | 4.3 sq mi | 11.2 km^{2} | Commission–manager | City | 1926 |
| 155 | Orange City | Volusia | 12,632 | 7.8 sq mi | 20.2 km^{2} | Council–manager | City | 1882 |
| 174 | Orange Park | Clay | 9,089 | 3.6 sq mi | 9.4 km^{2} | Council–manager | Town | 1879 |
| 366 | Orchid | Indian River | 516 | 1.2 sq mi | 3.2 km^{2} | Council–manager | Town | 1965 |
| 4 | Orlando† | Orange | 307,573 | 110.6 sq mi | 286.5 km^{2} | Mayor–council | City | 1875 |
| 71 | Ormond Beach | Volusia | 43,475 | 34.7 sq mi | 89.9 km^{2} | Commission–manager | City | 1880 |
| 404 | Otter Creek | Levy | 108 | 1.4 sq mi | 3.5 km^{2} | Mayor–council | Town | 1969 |
| 76 | Oviedo | Seminole | 40,059 | 15.5 sq mi | 40.1 km^{2} | Council–manager | City | 1925 |
| 216 | Pahokee | Palm Beach | 5,524 | 5.3 sq mi | 13.8 km^{2} | Commission–manager | City | 1922 |
| 167 | Palatka† | Putnam | 10,446 | 9.8 sq mi | 25.3 km^{2} | Commission–manager | City | 1853 |
| 16 | Palm Bay | Brevard | 119,760 | 86.4 sq mi | 223.8 km^{2} | Council–manager | City | 1960 |
| 173 | Palm Beach | Palm Beach | 9,245 | 3.8 sq mi | 9.8 km^{2} | Council–manager | Town | 1911 |
| 49 | Palm Beach Gardens | Palm Beach | 59,182 | 58.7 sq mi | 152.1 km^{2} | Council–manager | City | 1959 |
| 320 | Palm Beach Shores | Palm Beach | 1,330 | 0.29 sq mi | 0.76 km^{2} | Commission–manager | Town | 1951 |
| 27 | Palm Coast | Flagler | 89,258 | 95.4 sq mi | 247.0 km^{2} | Council–manager | City | 1999 |
| 322 | Palm Shores | Brevard | 1,200 | 0.60 sq mi | 1.6 km^{2} | Mayor–council | Town | 1959 |
| 96 | Palm Springs | Palm Beach | 26,890 | 4.2 sq mi | 10.9 km^{2} | Council–manager | Village | 1957 |
| 148 | Palmetto | Manatee | 13,323 | 5.4 sq mi | 13.9 km^{2} | Mayor–council | City | 1897 |
| 104 | Palmetto Bay | Miami-Dade | 24,439 | 8.3 sq mi | 21.5 km^{2} | Council–manager | Village | 2002 |
| 87 | Panama City† | Bay | 32,939 | 35.1 sq mi | 90.9 km^{2} | Commission–manager | City | 1909 |
| 123 | Panama City Beach | Bay | 18,094 | 19.3 sq mi | 50.0 km^{2} | Council–manager | City | 1977 |
| 235 | Parker | Bay | 4,010 | 1.9 sq mi | 4.9 km^{2} | Mayor–council | City | 1967 |
| 85 | Parkland | Broward | 34,670 | 12.5 sq mi | 32.4 km^{2} | Commission–manager | City | 1963 |
| 361 | Paxton | Walton | 556 | 3.7 sq mi | 9.6 km^{2} | Mayor–council | Town | 1952 |
| 205 | Pembroke Park | Broward | 6,260 | 1.4 sq mi | 3.6 km^{2} | Commission–manager | Town | 1957 |
| 11 | Pembroke Pines | Broward | 171,178 | 32.7 sq mi | 84.6 km^{2} | Commission–manager | City | 1960 |
| 340 | Penney Farms | Clay | 821 | 1.5 sq mi | 3.8 km^{2} | Council–manager | Town | 1927 |
| 56 | Pensacola† | Escambia | 54,312 | 22.7 sq mi | 58.7 km^{2} | Mayor–council | City | 1822 |
| 196 | Perry† | Taylor | 6,898 | 9.4 sq mi | 24.4 km^{2} | Council–manager | City | 1903 |
| 308 | Pierson | Volusia | 1,542 | 10.2 sq mi | 26.4 km^{2} | Mayor–council | Town | 1926 |
| 122 | Pinecrest | Miami-Dade | 18,388 | 7.5 sq mi | 19.3 km^{2} | Council–manager | Village | 1996 |
| 58 | Pinellas Park | Pinellas | 53,093 | 16.1 sq mi | 41.7 km^{2} | Council–manager | City | 1915 |
| 77 | Plant City | Hillsborough | 39,764 | 27.6 sq mi | 71.4 km^{2} | Commission–manager | City | 1885 |
| 26 | Plantation | Broward | 91,750 | 21.8 sq mi | 56.3 km^{2} | Mayor–council | City | 1953 |
| 268 | Polk City | Polk | 2,713 | 4.5 sq mi | 11.7 km^{2} | Council–manager | City | 1925 |
| 343 | Pomona Park | Putnam | 784 | 3.0 sq mi | 7.9 km^{2} | Mayor–council | Town | 1894 |
| 20 | Pompano Beach | Broward | 112,046 | 24.0 sq mi | 62.2 km^{2} | Commission–manager | City | 1908 |
| 367 | Ponce de Leon | Holmes | 504 | 5.0 sq mi | 12.8 km^{2} | Mayor–council | Town | 1963 |
| 247 | Ponce Inlet | Volusia | 3,364 | 4.5 sq mi | 11.6 km^{2} | Council–manager | Town | 1963 |
| 44 | Port Orange | Volusia | 62,596 | 26.8 sq mi | 69.4 km^{2} | Council–manager | City | 1867 |
| 255 | Port Richey | Pasco | 3,052 | 2.2 sq mi | 5.7 km^{2} | Council–manager | City | 1925 |
| 248 | Port St. Joe† | Gulf | 3,357 | 9.4 sq mi | 24.3 km^{2} | Commission–manager | City | 1913 |
| 7 | Port St. Lucie | St. Lucie | 204,851 | 119.2 sq mi | 308.8 km^{2} | Council–manager | City | 1961 |
| 113 | Punta Gorda† | Charlotte | 19,471 | 15.5 sq mi | 40.1 km^{2} | Council–manager | City | 1900 |
| 183 | Quincy† | Gadsden | 7,970 | 11.6 sq mi | 30.2 km^{2} | Commission–manager | City | 1828 |
| 396 | Raiford | Union | 224 | 0.55 sq mi | 1.4 km^{2} | Mayor–council | Town | 1971 |
| 376 | Reddick | Marion | 449 | 1.3 sq mi | 3.3 km^{2} | Mayor–council | Town | 1925 |
| 318 | Redington Beach | Pinellas | 1,376 | 0.36 sq mi | 0.93 km^{2} | Mayor–commission | Town | 1944 |
| 283 | Redington Shores | Pinellas | 2,176 | 0.33 sq mi | 0.85 km^{2} | Mayor–commission | Town | 1955 |
| 80 | Riviera Beach | Palm Beach | 37,604 | 8.3 sq mi | 21.4 km^{2} | Council–manager | City | 1922 |
| 93 | Rockledge | Brevard | 27,678 | 13.2 sq mi | 34.2 km^{2} | Council–manager | City | 1887 |
| 78 | Royal Palm Beach | Palm Beach | 38,932 | 11.3 sq mi | 29.4 km^{2} | Council–manager | Village | 1959 |
| 126 | Safety Harbor | Pinellas | 17,072 | 4.9 sq mi | 12.8 km^{2} | Commission–manager | City | 1917 |
| 321 | San Antonio | Pasco | 1,297 | 1.4 sq mi | 3.5 km^{2} | Mayor–commission | City | 1891 |
| 46 | Sanford† | Seminole | 61,051 | 23.6 sq mi | 61.1 km^{2} | Commission–manager | City | 1877 |
| 202 | Sanibel | Lee | 6,382 | 16.2 sq mi | 41.9 km^{2} | Council–manager | City | 1974 |
| 55 | Sarasota† | Sarasota | 54,842 | 14.7 sq mi | 38.1 km^{2} | Commission–manager | City | 1902 |
| 163 | Satellite Beach | Brevard | 11,226 | 2.9 sq mi | 7.6 km^{2} | Council–manager | City | 1957 |
| 362 | Sea Ranch Lakes | Broward | 540 | 0.17 sq mi | 0.45 km^{2} | Mayor–council | Village | 1959 |
| 103 | Sebastian | Indian River | 25,054 | 15.8 sq mi | 40.9 km^{2} | Council–manager | City | 1924 |
| 164 | Sebring† | Highlands | 10,729 | 10.1 sq mi | 26.2 km^{2} | Council–manager | City | 1924 |
| 114 | Seminole | Pinellas | 19,364 | 5.2 sq mi | 13.4 km^{2} | Council–manager | City | 1970 |
| 289 | Sewall's Point | Martin | 1,991 | 1.2 sq mi | 3.1 km^{2} | Commission–manager | Town | 1957 |
| 348 | Shalimar | Okaloosa | 737 | 0.29 sq mi | 0.75 km^{2} | Commission–manager | Town | 1947 |
| 301 | Sneads | Jackson | 1,699 | 4.4 sq mi | 11.4 km^{2} | Council–manager | Town | 1894 |
| 378 | Sopchoppy | Wakulla | 426 | 1.7 sq mi | 4.3 km^{2} | Mayor–council | City | 1955 |
| 227 | South Bay | Palm Beach | 4,860 | 2.9 sq mi | 7.4 km^{2} | Commission–manager | City | 1941 |
| 154 | South Daytona | Volusia | 12,865 | 3.7 sq mi | 9.6 km^{2} | Council–manager | City | 1938 |
| 157 | South Miami | Miami-Dade | 12,026 | 2.3 sq mi | 5.9 km^{2} | Commission–manager | City | 1926 |
| 314 | South Palm Beach | Palm Beach | 1,471 | 0.11 sq mi | 0.28 km^{2} | Council–manager | Town | 1955 |
| 218 | South Pasadena | Pinellas | 5,353 | 0.61 sq mi | 1.6 km^{2} | Mayor–commission | City | 1955 |
| 184 | Southwest Ranches | Broward | 7,607 | 13.0 sq mi | 33.6 km^{2} | Mayor–council | Town | 2000 |
| 182 | Springfield | Bay | 8,075 | 4.2 sq mi | 10.8 km^{2} | Mayor–commission | City | 1935 |
| 143 | St. Augustine† | St. Johns | 14,329 | 9.5 sq mi | 24.7 km^{2} | Commission–manager | City | 1822 |
| 197 | St. Augustine Beach | St. Johns | 6,803 | 2.1 sq mi | 5.5 km^{2} | Commission–manager | City | 1959 |
| 50 | St. Cloud | Osceola | 58,964 | 25.5 sq mi | 65.9 km^{2} | Council–manager | City | 1911 |
| 275 | St. Leo | Pasco | 2,362 | 1.1 sq mi | 2.9 km^{2} | Mayor–commission | Town | 1891 |
| 358 | St. Lucie Village | St. Lucie | 613 | 0.90 sq mi | 2.3 km^{2} | Mayor–council | Town | 1961 |
| 390 | St. Marks | Wakulla | 274 | 2.0 sq mi | 5.1 km^{2} | Commission–manager | City | 1963 |
| 179 | St. Pete Beach | Pinellas | 8,879 | 2.1 sq mi | 5.5 km^{2} | Commission–manager | City | 1957 |
| 5 | St. Petersburg | Pinellas | 258,308 | 61.8 sq mi | 160.1 km^{2} | Mayor–commission | City | 1903 |
| 213 | Starke† | Bradford | 5,796 | 7.2 sq mi | 18.6 km^{2} | Commission–manager | City | 1870 |
| 124 | Stuart† | Martin | 17,425 | 7.0 sq mi | 18.3 km^{2} | Commission–manager | City | 1914 |
| 109 | Sunny Isles Beach | Miami-Dade | 22,342 | 1.0 sq mi | 2.6 km^{2} | Commission–manager | City | 1997 |
| 24 | Sunrise | Broward | 97,335 | 16.2 sq mi | 42.0 km^{2} | Commission–manager | City | 1961 |
| 214 | Surfside | Miami-Dade | 5,689 | 0.56 sq mi | 1.4 km^{2} | Commission–manager | Town | 1935 |
| 115 | Sweetwater | Miami-Dade | 19,363 | 2.2 sq mi | 5.7 km^{2} | Mayor–commission | City | 1941 |
| 8 | Tallahassee # † | Leon | 196,169 | 100.9 sq mi | 261.4 km^{2} | Commission–manager | City | 1825 |
| 40 | Tamarac | Broward | 71,897 | 11.6 sq mi | 30.0 km^{2} | Commission–manager | City | 1963 |
| 3 | Tampa† | Hillsborough | 384,959 | 114.0 sq mi | 295.3 km^{2} | Mayor–council | City | 1855 |
| 102 | Tarpon Springs | Pinellas | 25,117 | 9.1 sq mi | 23.6 km^{2} | Commission–manager | City | 1887 |
| 119 | Tavares† | Lake | 19,003 | 12.2 sq mi | 31.5 km^{2} | Mayor–council | City | 1885 |
| 97 | Temple Terrace | Hillsborough | 26,690 | 7.3 sq mi | 19.0 km^{2} | Council–manager | City | 1925 |
| 209 | Tequesta | Palm Beach | 6,158 | 1.8 sq mi | 4.7 km^{2} | Council–manager | Village | 1957 |
| 61 | Titusville† | Brevard | 48,789 | 29.2 sq mi | 75.7 km^{2} | Council–manager | City | 1887 |
| 200 | Treasure Island | Pinellas | 6,584 | 1.5 sq mi | 4.0 km^{2} | Commission–manager | City | 1955 |
| 288 | Trenton† | Gilchrist | 2,015 | 3.4 sq mi | 8.8 km^{2} | Commission–manager | City | 1911 |
| 240 | Umatilla | Lake | 3,685 | 3.6 sq mi | 9.3 km^{2} | Council–manager | City | 1904 |
| 229 | Valparaiso | Okaloosa | 4,752 | 11.8 sq mi | 30.7 km^{2} | Mayor–commission | City | 1921 |
| 101 | Venice | Sarasota | 25,463 | 15.9 sq mi | 41.3 km^{2} | Council–manager | City | 1926 |
| 349 | Vernon | Washington | 732 | 4.8 sq mi | 12.3 km^{2} | Mayor–council | City | 1926 |
| 132 | Vero Beach† | Indian River | 16,354 | 11.4 sq mi | 29.6 km^{2} | Commission–manager | City | 1919 |
| 274 | Virginia Gardens | Miami-Dade | 2,364 | 0.29 sq mi | 0.76 km^{2} | Mayor–council | Village | 1947 |
| 338-T | Waldo | Alachua | 846 | 2.2 sq mi | 5.6 km^{2} | Council–manager | City | 1907 |
| 226 | Wauchula† | Hardee | 4,900 | 3.3 sq mi | 8.5 km^{2} | Commission–manager | City | 1902 |
| 383 | Wausau | Washington | 371 | 1.2 sq mi | 3.0 km^{2} | Mayor–council | Town | 1963 |
| 344 | Webster | Sumter | 778 | 1.6 sq mi | 4.1 km^{2} | Mayor–commission | City | 1957 |
| 350 | Welaka | Putnam | 714 | 1.5 sq mi | 3.8 km^{2} | Mayor–council | Town | 1887 |
| 45 | Wellington | Palm Beach | 61,637 | 45.0 sq mi | 116.5 km^{2} | Council–manager | Village | 1995 |
| 100 | West Melbourne | Brevard | 25,924 | 10.7 sq mi | 27.6 km^{2} | Council–manager | City | 1959 |
| 192 | West Miami | Miami-Dade | 7,233 | 0.71 sq mi | 1.8 km^{2} | Commission–manager | City | 1947 |
| 17 | West Palm Beach† | Palm Beach | 117,415 | 53.8 sq mi | 139.4 km^{2} | Mayor–commission | City | 1894 |
| 139 | West Park | Broward | 15,130 | 2.2 sq mi | 5.7 km^{2} | Commission–manager | City | 2005 |
| 334 | Westlake | Palm Beach | 906 | 6.4 sq mi | 16.5 km^{2} | Mayor–council | City | 2016 |
| 41 | Weston | Broward | 68,107 | 24.6 sq mi | 63.7 km^{2} | Commission–manager | City | 1996 |
| 392 | Westville | Holmes | 261 | 7.2 sq mi | 18.7 km^{2} | Mayor–council | Town | 1970 |
| 287 | Wewahitchka | Gulf | 2,074 | 6.7 sq mi | 17.3 km^{2} | Commission–manager | City | 1959 |
| 347 | White Springs | Hamilton | 740 | 1.8 sq mi | 4.7 km^{2} | Council–manager | Town | 1885 |
| 137 | Wildwood | Sumter | 15,730 | 56.3 sq mi | 145.8 km^{2} | Commission–manager | City | 1877 |
| 261 | Williston | Levy | 2,976 | 6.8 sq mi | 17.7 km^{2} | Council–manager | City | 1929 |
| 161 | Wilton Manors | Broward | 11,426 | 2.0 sq mi | 5.1 km^{2} | Commission–manager | City | 1947 |
| 257 | Windermere | Orange | 3,030 | 1.9 sq mi | 5.0 km^{2} | Council–manager | Town | 1925 |
| 64 | Winter Garden | Orange | 46,964 | 16.3 sq mi | 42.2 km^{2} | Commission–manager | City | 1908 |
| 60 | Winter Haven | Polk | 49,219 | 32.5 sq mi | 84.1 km^{2} | Commission–manager | City | 1923 |
| 91 | Winter Park | Orange | 29,795 | 8.8 sq mi | 22.7 km^{2} | Commission–manager | City | 1887 |
| 79 | Winter Springs | Seminole | 38,342 | 14.9 sq mi | 38.5 km^{2} | Commission–manager | City | 1959 |
| 381 | Worthington Springs | Union | 378 | 0.96 sq mi | 2.5 km^{2} | Mayor–council | Town | 1963 |
| 359 | Yankeetown | Levy | 588 | 7.7 sq mi | 20.0 km^{2} | Mayor–council | Town | 1925 |
| 125 | Zephyrhills | Pasco | 17,194 | 9.5 sq mi | 24.6 km^{2} | Council–manager | City | 1914 |
| 298 | Zolfo Springs | Hardee | 1,737 | 1.7 sq mi | 4.5 km^{2} | Commission–manager | Town | 1904 |

== See also ==
- List of counties in Florida
- List of places in Florida
- List of former municipalities in Florida
- List of census-designated places in Florida

== Bibliography ==
- Florida House of Representatives Local Government & Veterans Affairs Committee (2003), Local Government Formation Manual (PDF), Tallahassee
- Robert E. Lang (2003), Beyond Edge City: Office Sprawl in South Florida (PDF), Washington, DC: Brookings Institution

== See also ==
- List of census-designated places in Florida
- List of counties in Florida
