= Lake of the Clouds (disambiguation) =

Lake of the Clouds is a lake in Ontonagon County, Michigan.

Lake(s) of the Clouds may also refer to:

- Lake of the Clouds, a room in the Carlsbad Caverns of New Mexico
- Lake of the Clouds, a lake in the Rocky Mountain National Park of Colorado
- Lakes of the Clouds, a set of small tarns in the White Mountains of New Hampshire
  - Lakes of the Clouds Hut, a shelter on Mount Washington in New Hampshire

== See also ==
- Cloud Lake, Florida, a town in Palm Beach County
