= Edgewood, Florida =

City in Florida, US

- City
- City of Edgewood
- Logo

- Location in Orange County and the state of Florida
- Coordinates: 28°29′43″N 81°22′29″W
- Country: United States
- State: Florida
- County: Orange
- Settled: c. 1873–1881
- Incorporated (town): April 24, 1924
- Reincorporated (city): 1973

Government
  - Type: Mayor–Council
  - Mayor: John Dowless
  - Council President: Richard A. Horn
  - Council Members: Casey McElroy, Ryan Santurri, Beth Steele, and Council President Pro-Tem Susan Lomas
  - Administrative Project Manager: Brett Sollazzo
  - City Clerk: Sandy Riffle

Area
  - Total: 1.54 sq mi (3.98 km^{2})
  - Land: 1.24 sq mi (3.20 km^{2})
  - Water: 0.30 sq mi (0.77 km^{2})
- Elevation: 92 ft (28 m)

Population (2020)
  - Total: 2,685
  - Density: 2,170.0/sq mi (837.84/km^{2})
- Time zone: UTC-5 (Eastern (EST))
  - Summer (DST): UTC-4 (EDT)
- ZIP codes: 32809, 32839
- Area codes: 407, 689
- FIPS code: 12-19900
- GNIS feature ID: 2403543
- Website: www.edgewood-fl.gov

Edgewood is a city in Orange County, Florida, United States. It is part of the Orlando–Kissimmee–Sanford Metropolitan Statistical Area. The population was 2,685 at the 2020 census.

== Geography ==
According to the United States Census Bureau, the city has a total area of 1.5 square miles (3.9 km^{2}), of which 1.2 square miles (3.1 km^{2}) is land and 0.3 square miles (0.78 km^{2}) (18.24%) is water.

=== Climate ===
The climate for the City of Edgewood is characterized by hot, humid summers and generally mild to cool winters. According to the Köppen Climate Classification system, Edgewood has a humid subtropical climate zone, abbreviated "Cfa" on climate maps.

== Demographics ==
Historical population
Census	Pop.	Note	%±
1930	103		—
1940	34		−67.0%
1950	217		538.2%
1960	436		100.9%
1970	392		−10.1%
1980	1,034		163.8%
1990	1,062		2.7%
2000	1,901		79.0%
2010	2,503		31.7%
2020	2,685		7.3%
U.S. Decennial Census

=== Racial and ethnic composition ===
Edgewood racial composition (Hispanics excluded from racial categories) (NH = Non-Hispanic)
Race	Pop 2010	Pop 2020	% 2010	% 2020
White (NH)	1,748	1,660	69.84%	61.82%
Black or African American (NH)	251	242	10.03%	9.01%
Native American or Alaska Native (NH)	6	8	0.24%	0.30%
Asian (NH)	109	204	4.35%	7.60%
Pacific Islander or Native Hawaiian (NH)	0	7	0.00%	0.26%
Some other race (NH)	7	22	0.28%	0.82%
Two or more races/Multiracial (NH)	47	142	1.88%	5.29%
Hispanic or Latino (any race)	335	400	13.38%	14.90%
Total	2,503	2,685	100.00%	100.00%

=== 2020 census ===
As of the 2020 census, Edgewood had a population of 2,685. The median age was 44.5 years. 18.8% of residents were under the age of 18 and 18.0% of residents were 65 years of age or older. For every 100 females there were 96.0 males, and for every 100 females age 18 and over there were 92.9 males age 18 and over.

100.0% of residents lived in urban areas, while 0.0% lived in rural areas.

There were 1,067 households in Edgewood, of which 30.7% had children under the age of 18 living in them. Of all households, 56.2% were married-couple households, 16.6% were households with a male householder and no spouse or partner present, and 20.6% were households with a female householder and no spouse or partner present. About 23.1% of all households were made up of individuals and 9.1% had someone living alone who was 65 years of age or older.

There were 1,121 housing units, of which 4.8% were vacant. The homeowner vacancy rate was 1.6% and the rental vacancy rate was 7.4%.

The U.S. Census Bureau's 2020 American Community Survey 5-year estimates reported 782 families residing in the city.

=== 2010 census ===
As of the 2010 United States census, there were 2,503 people, 960 households, and 633 families residing in the city.

=== 2000 census ===
At the 2000 census there were 1,901 people in 798 households, including 549 families, in the city. The population density was 1,566.1 inhabitants per square mile (604.7/km^{2}). There were 847 housing units at an average density of 697.8 per square mile (269.4/km^{2}). The racial makeup of the city was 89.69% White, 4.63% African American, 0.37% Native American, 2.26% Asian, 1.32% from other races, and 1.74% from two or more races. Hispanic or Latino of any race were 7.63%.

Of the 798 households in 2000, 24.4% had children under the age of 18 living with them, 60.2% were married couples living together, 6.3% had a female householder with no husband present, and 31.1% were non-families. 25.9% of households were one person and 8.9% were one person aged 65 or older. The average household size was 2.35 and the average family size was 2.80.

In 2000, the age distribution in 2000 was 20.4% under the age of 18, 4.7% from 18 to 24, 30.0% from 25 to 44, 28.0% from 45 to 64, and 16.8% 65 or older. The median age was 42 years. For every 100 females, there were 96.8 males. For every 100 females age 18 and over, there were 96.7 males.

In 2000, the median household income was $56,528 and the median family income was $68,977. Males had a median income of $39,250 versus $30,263 for females. The per capita income for the city was $33,452. About 2.9% of families and 6.2% of the population were below the poverty line, including 4.7% of those under age 18 and 5.8% of those age 65 or over.
