= Jupiter Inlet Colony, Florida =

Town in the state of Florida, United States

- Town
- Town of Jupiter Inlet Colony
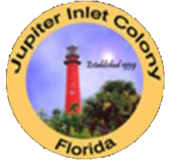
- Seal

- Location of Jupiter Inlet Colony in Palm Beach County, Florida
- Coordinates: 26°56′53″N 80°04′32″W
- Country: United States
- State: Florida
- County: Palm Beach
- Founded: 1958
- Incorporated: 1959

Government
  - Type: Mayor-Commission
  - Mayor: Mark Ciarfella
  - Vice Mayor: William "Bill" Muir
  - Commissioners: Sharon Seagren, Janet Saura, and David "Dave" Shula
  - Town Manager: Heidi Siegel
  - Town Clerk: Jackie Milo

Area
  - Total: 0.21 sq mi (0.54 km^{2})
  - Land: 0.15 sq mi (0.40 km^{2})
  - Water: 0.054 sq mi (0.14 km^{2})
- Elevation: 10 ft (3.0 m)

Population (2020)
  - Total: 405
  - Density: 2,615.0/sq mi (1,009.65/km^{2})
- Time zone: UTC-5 (Eastern (EST))
  - Summer (DST): UTC-4 (EDT)
- ZIP code: 33469
- Area codes: 561, 728
- FIPS code: 12-35900
- GNIS feature ID: 2405928
- Website: www.jupiterinletcolony.gov

Jupiter Inlet Colony is a town in Palm Beach County, Florida, United States. The Town of Jupiter Inlet Colony was platted in 1958 and officially incorporated as a municipality in 1959, and is part of the Miami metropolitan area of South Florida. The population was 405 at the 2020 US census. It is situated towards the north bank of the Jupiter Inlet.

== Geography ==
The Town of Jupiter Inlet Colony is located in the southernmost tip of Jupiter Island.

According to the United States Census Bureau, the town has a total area of 0.2 square miles (0.52 km^{2}), of which 0.2 square miles (0.52 km^{2}) is land and 0.1 square miles (0.26 km^{2}) (21.74%) is water.

=== Roads ===
- Beacon Ln.
- Colony Rd.
- Ocean Dr.
- Beach Rd. (County Road 707)
- Shelter Ln.
- Lighthouse Dr.
- Treasure Pl.

=== Climate ===
The Town of Jupiter Inlet Colony has a tropical climate, similar to the climate found in much of the Caribbean. It is part of the only region in the 48 contiguous states that falls under that category. More specifically, it generally has a tropical savanna climate (Köppen climate classification: Aw), bordering a tropical monsoon climate (Köppen climate classification: Am).

== Demographics ==
Historical population
Census	Pop.	Note	%±
1960	242		—
1970	396		63.6%
1980	378		−4.5%
1990	405		7.1%
2000	368		−9.1%
2010	400		8.7%
2020	405		1.3%
U.S. Decennial Census

=== 2010 and 2020 census ===
Jupiter Inlet Colony racial composition (Hispanics excluded from racial categories) (NH = Non-Hispanic)
Race	Pop 2010	Pop 2020	% 2010	% 2020
White (NH)	378	372	94.50%	91.85%
Black or African American (NH)	0	1	0.00%	0.25%
Native American or Alaska Native (NH)	0	0	0.00%	0.00%
Asian (NH)	3	5	0.75%	1.23%
Pacific Islander or Native Hawaiian (NH)	0	0	0.00%	0.00%
Some other race (NH)	0	0	0.00%	0.00%
Two or more races/Multiracial (NH)	14	16	3.50%	3.95%
Hispanic or Latino (any race)	5	11	1.25%	2.72%
Total	400	405	100.00%	100.00%

As of the 2020 United States census, there were 405 people, 174 households, and 117 families residing in the town.

As of the 2010 United States census, there were 400 people, 198 households, and 135 families residing in the town.

=== 2000 census ===
At the 2000 census there were 368 people, 180 households, and 124 families in the town. The population density was 2,090.1 inhabitants per square mile (807.0/km^{2}). There were 229 housing units at an average density of 1,300.6 per square mile (502.2/km^{2}). The racial makeup of the town was 99.73% White, and 0.27% from other races. Of the 180 households 12.2% had children under the age of 18 living with them, 64.4% were married couples living together, 3.3% had a female householder with no husband present, and 31.1% were non-families. 23.9% of households were one person and 15.0% were one person aged 65 or older. The average household size was 2.04 and the average family size was 2.38.

In 2000, the age distribution was 10.6% under the age of 18, 1.1% from 18 to 24, 12.2% from 25 to 44, 36.1% from 45 to 64, and 39.9% 65 or older. The median age was 60 years. For every 100 females, there were 98.9 males. For every 100 females age 18 and over, there were 92.4 males.

In 2000, the median household income was $65,938 and the median family income was $93,554. Males had a median income of $90,000 versus $41,875 for females. The per capita income for the town was $66,713. About 1.6% of families and 3.9% of the population were below the poverty line, including 10.0% of those under age 18 and 1.2% of those age 65 or over.

As of 2000, 100% of the population spoke English as their first language. It, along with Briny Breezes, Cloud Lake, and Golf, were the only municipalities in Palm Beach county with all residents having the mother tongue of English.

== Notable people ==
- Perry Como, lived on Lighthouse Drive for 29 years, until his death in 2001
- Alan Jackson, moved to Jupiter Island
- Olivia Newton-John, resided there from 2009 to 2013.
- Kid Rock, still lives at Jupiter Inlet Colony
- Tammy Wynette, moved to Jupiter Island
