= Pia Dandiya =

American politician

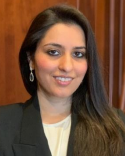

Member-elect of the U.S. House of Representatives from Florida's 22nd district
- Assuming office January 3, 2027
- Succeeding: Lois Frankel (redistricted)

Personal details
- Born: May 12, 1987 (age 39) Palm Beach County, Florida, U.S.
- Party: Republican (before 2020); Democratic (2020–present)
- Children: 1
- Education: Harvard University (BA); Boston University (MEd)
- Website: Campaign website

Pia Prem Dandiya (born May 12, 1987) is an American educator, former technology executive, and politician who is the United States representative-elect from Florida's 22nd congressional district. A former high school principal and White House Fellow, she later led public-sector initiatives at Apple Inc. She was the Democratic nominee for Florida's 22nd congressional district in the 2026 election, defeating Republican nominee Casey Askar.

== Early life and education ==
Dandiya was born and raised in Palm Beach County, Florida. She is a first-generation American; her parents immigrated to the United States from India. Her parents moved from Jaipur to Jupiter, Florida, in the 1980s, where she was raised; her father practiced medicine and her mother founded a Montessori school.

Dandiya earned a Bachelor of Arts in government from Harvard University and a Master of Education from Boston University.

== Career ==
Dandiya began her career in Boston as a Teach for America corps member, teaching middle school mathematics, and later managed teacher leadership development for Teach for America in New York. At age 28, she became the founding principal of Democracy Prep Endurance High School in Harlem, New York.

Dandiya was named to the 2020–2021 class of White House Fellows and placed at the United States Department of Education. Her fellowship spanned the Trump and Biden administrations and included work with the Domestic Policy Council on child development, school nutrition, and access to education.

Beginning in January 2022, Dandiya worked at Apple, where she led public-sector partnerships and initiatives focused on education, health care, and government services.

== U.S. House of Representatives ==
=== Elections ===
==== 2026 ====
Florida's 21st congressional district before 2026 redistricting

Florida's 22nd congressional district after 2026 redistricting

Dandiya announced her candidacy for Florida's 21st congressional district in June 2025, challenging Republican incumbent Brian Mast. State records showed she had been registered as a Republican until switching her registration to Democratic in 2020.

After Governor Ron DeSantis pushed through a mid-decade congressional redistricting in 2026, Dandiya moved her campaign to the newly drawn 22nd district, an open seat. The redrawn district extends from western Palm Beach County through Broward County toward the Gulf Coast. Incumbent Democrat Lois Frankel chose to run in the neighboring 23rd district.

On August 18, 2026, Dandiya defeated attorney Kaysia Earley in the Democratic primary, winning 68.6 percent of the vote according to certified results. She faced Republican nominee Casey Askar in the November 3 general election.

Dandiya's platform focused on lowering the cost of living, including housing, child care, health care, and insurance; strengthening public education, including universal pre-K; and protecting Social Security, Medicare, Medicaid, and reproductive rights. She has called for ending tariffs, saying their costs have reached ordinary consumers. Her government-reform proposals include banning members of Congress from trading individual stocks and limiting the influence of lobbyists.

Her campaign has been endorsed by EMILY's List, the Florida AFL–CIO, Florida Democratic Party chair Nikki Fried, and Frankel, and in August 2026 the Democratic Congressional Campaign Committee added her to its "Red to Blue" program. The South Florida Sun Sentinel editorial board endorsed her in the Democratic primary. By early August 2026, her fundraising had exceeded $2 million.

She won the 2026 general election by almost 3 points.

== Political positions ==
On healthcare, Dandiya supports policies designed to lower costs. These include allowing Medicare to negotiate prescription drug prices and restoring the Affordable Care Act subsidies that had been previously cancelled.

Regarding Social Security, Dandiya favors raising the cap on income subject to Social Security tax as a way to fund Social Security for the future. She said in a 2026 interview on WFLX that:

People have been spending years saving into that Social Security, expecting to have a retirement in dignity. In my view, there is no world in which we can walk back on that promise.

== Personal life ==
Dandiya lives in Palm Beach Gardens, Florida, with her husband and son.

== Electoral history ==
2026 Democratic primary, Florida's 22nd congressional district
Party	Candidate	Votes	%
Democratic	Pia Dandiya	26,067	68.6
Democratic	Kaysia Earley	11,947	31.4
Total votes		38,014	100.0

U.S. House of Representatives
Preceded by Lois Frankel; Redistricted	Member of the U.S. House of Representatives from Florida's 22nd congressional district Taking office 2027	Elect
