= Kenwood Estates, Florida =

- CDP
- Location within Florida
- Coordinates: 26°37′39″N 80°06′55″W
- Country: United States
- State: Florida
- County: Palm Beach

Area
  - Total: 0.17 sq mi (0.45 km^{2})
  - Land: 0.17 sq mi (0.45 km^{2})
  - Water: 0 sq mi (0.00 km^{2})
- Elevation: 16 ft (4.9 m)

Population (2020)
  - Total: 1,435
  - Density: 8,219.6/sq mi (3,173.61/km^{2})
- Time zone: UTC-5 (Eastern (EST))
  - Summer (DST): UTC-4 (EDT)
- Area codes: 561, 728
- GNIS feature ID: 2628522

Kenwood Estates is a census-designated place (CDP) in Palm Beach County, Florida, United States. It is part of the Miami metropolitan area of South Florida. The population had 1,435 residents as of the 2020 census.

== Geography ==
Kenwood Estates is located between Greenacres and Palm Springs; State Road 809 (Military Trail) passes through the community. More specifically, the CDP is defined from Attleboro Avenue westward to Haverhill Road, while the community's southern boundary is the L-11 Canal and the northern extent is generally along the southside of 10th Avenue North.

== History ==
As early as 1925, the Alfred H. Wagg Organization, inc. began advertising the Kenwood development along "the beautiful Pine Ridge of Military Trail" and noting that the area would eventually include a shopping center, apartment complexes, duplexes, and a number of single family homes.

Kenwood Estates has been a priority focus area of the Countywide Community Revitalization Team (CCRT) since the early 2000s. CCRT, established by Board of County Commissioners in 1997, studies and coordinates efforts to improve certain communities in Palm Beach County. Between August 2003 and January 2010, the board approved more than $2.7 million in expenditures to improve Kenwood Estates. Projects undertaken included the addition of a neighborhood park, sidewalks, speed bumps, and streetlights, as well as improvements to drainage and pavement. A community policing deputy was also assigned to the community to restore a sense of security.

== Demographics ==
Historical population
Census	Pop.	Note	%±
2010	1,283		—
2020	1,435		11.8%
U.S. Decennial Census

Kenwood Estates first appeared as a census designated place in the 2010 U.S. census formed from part of thr deleted Lake Worth Corridor CDP.

=== Racial and ethnic composition ===
Kenwood Estates CDP, Florida – Racial and ethnic composition Note: the US Census treats Hispanic/Latino as an ethnic category. This table excludes Latinos from the racial categories and assigns them to a separate category. Hispanics/Latinos may be of any race.
Race / Ethnicity (NH = Non-Hispanic)	Pop 2010	Pop 2020	% 2010	% 2020
White alone (NH)	293	240	22.84%	16.72%
Black or African American alone (NH)	122	157	9.51%	10.94%
Native American or Alaska Native alone (NH)	3	1	0.23%	0.07%
Asian alone (NH)	47	41	3.66%	2.86%
Native Hawaiian or Pacific Islander alone (NH)	0	0	0.00%	0.00%
Other race alone (NH)	4	13	0.31%	0.91%
Mixed race or Multiracial (NH)	15	17	1.17%	1.18%
Hispanic or Latino (any race)	799	966	62.28%	67.32%
Total	1,283	1,435	100.00%	100.00%

=== 2020 census ===
As of the 2020 census, Kenwood Estates had a population of 1,435. The median age was 32.7 years. 26.6% of residents were under the age of 18 and 10.2% of residents were 65 years of age or older. For every 100 females there were 95.0 males, and for every 100 females age 18 and over there were 92.0 males age 18 and over.

100.0% of residents lived in urban areas, while 0.0% lived in rural areas.

There were 427 households in Kenwood Estates, of which 48.5% had children under the age of 18 living in them. Of all households, 43.6% were married-couple households, 22.0% were households with a male householder and no spouse or partner present, and 23.0% were households with a female householder and no spouse or partner present. About 10.8% of all households were made up of individuals and 5.4% had someone living alone who was 65 years of age or older.

There were 444 housing units, of which 3.8% were vacant. The homeowner vacancy rate was 3.1% and the rental vacancy rate was 2.8%.

=== Demographic estimates ===
In the Census Bureau's 2020 American Community Survey 5-year estimates, there were 268 families residing in the CDP.
