= Briny Breezes, Florida =

Town in the state of Florida, United States

- Town
- Town of Briny Breezes
- Seal

- Location of Briny Breezes, Florida
- Coordinates: 26°30′32″N 80°03′09″W
- Country: United States
- State: Florida
- County: Palm Beach
- Settled (Shore Acres Dairy): c. 1905-1919
- Unincorporated (Briny Breezes): 1925
- Incorporated (Town of Briny Breezes): March 19, 1963

Government
  - Type: Council-Manager
  - Mayor: Ted Gross
  - Council President: Elizabeth "Liz" Loper
  - Alderman: Jeff Duncan, David White, Bill Birch, and Holly Reitnauer
  - Town Manager: William "Bill" H. Thrasher
  - Town Clerk: Sandi DuBose

Area
  - Total: 0.10 sq mi (0.27 km^{2})
  - Land: 0.058 sq mi (0.15 km^{2})
  - Water: 0.050 sq mi (0.13 km^{2})
- Elevation: 7 ft (2.1 m)

Population (2020)
  - Total: 502
  - Density: 8,775.9/sq mi (3,388.41/km^{2})
- Time zone: UTC-5 (Eastern (EST))
  - Summer (DST): UTC-4 (EDT)
- ZIP code: 33435
- Area codes: 561, 728
- FIPS code: 12-08575
- GNIS feature ID: 2405323
- Website: www.brinybreezes.us

Briny Breezes is a town in Palm Beach County, Florida, United States. The town is part of the Miami metropolitan area of South Florida. Briny Breezes (or "Briny" as it is known locally) is a small coastal community of approximately 488 mobile homes along State Road A1A. Briny is a private community consisting mostly of "snowbirds" from the Northeastern, the Midwest, and Canada. It and Ocean Breeze are the only two mobile home parks in Florida that are incorporated towns. The population was 502 at the 2020 US census.

== History ==
In 1919, the land housed a dairy farm owned by Michigan lumberman Ward Miller, then known as Shore Acres Dairy. Around the time of the Great Depression, he allowed tourists, who brought their trailers down from the North, to camp on his land. He began advertising the land by placing flyers in Northern newspapers, such as the Chicago Tribune, that touted Briny's "$3 a week rent." In 1958, Miller wanted to retire and made an offer to the campers to buy the land: $2,000 per lot and $2,500 for those near the water. The campers brought their assets together and the Town of Briny Breezes was incorporated on March 19, 1963, complete with its own mayor and post office.

The town's first mayor was Hugh David. He held office until his death in 1997, and was never opposed in an election. His successor, Robert Conkey, also died in office only months into his second term in 2000. Conkey's second term was notable as he won the election by only five votes.

In its beginnings, the town was mainly made up of families that came to live during the winter. Now, the residents are senior citizens that live there either year round or just in the winter.

Parts of the 1992 comedy-drama movie Folks!, starring Tom Selleck and Don Ameche, were filmed in Briny Breezes. The town was used as the setting for the 2005 film In Her Shoes, and many of its residents served as extras in the movie.

=== Development ===
In October 2005, developer Jean Francois Roy, of Ocean Land Investments, made an offer to buy the entire town for $500 million. This would equate to an average of slightly more than $1 million per residential lot. In December 2005, it was announced that 73 percent of the 488 lot owners had voted to hire a lawyer to pursue the sale. Later, Roy raised his offer to $510 million.

Had the sale gone through, it would have meant a huge windfall for each lot owner. Many people paid between $30,000 and $40,000 when they purchased their homes. In comparison, the 2000 census reported $129,000 was the median value of a home in Briny.

A vote to ratify the deal was set for January 10, 2007, and 80 percent of residents approved of the sale, with 97 percent of owners voting. The residents would not receive any compensation until 2009 and the plan was yet to be approved by state and local officials, due to zoning concerns.

However, on July 30, 2007, when the "earnest money" was due to the town, the deal was cancelled by the land developer over a dispute with the town board of directors over how long a period was to be allowed for due diligence.

== Geography ==
The Town of Briny Breezes is about 1.6 miles south of Ocean Ridge and 1.3 miles north of Gulf Stream and sits between the Atlantic Ocean on the east and the Intracoastal Waterway to the west.

According to the United States Census Bureau, the town has a total area of 0.1 square miles (0.26 km^{2}), of which 0.1 square miles (0.26 km^{2}) is land and 0.04 square miles (0.10 km^{2}) (22.22%) is water.

=== Climate ===
The Town of Briny Breezes has a tropical climate, similar to the climate found in much of the Caribbean. It is part of the only region in the 48 contiguous states that falls under that category. More specifically, it generally has a tropical savanna climate (Köppen climate classification: Aw), bordering a tropical monsoon climate (Köppen climate classification: Am).

== Demographics ==
Historical population
Census	Pop.	Note	%±
1970	481		—
1980	387		−19.5%
1990	400		3.4%
2000	411		2.8%
2010	601		46.2%
2020	502		−16.5%
U.S. Decennial Census

=== 2010 and 2020 census ===
Briny Breezes racial composition (Hispanics excluded from racial categories) (NH = Non-Hispanic)
Race	Pop 2010	Pop 2020	% 2010	% 2020
White (NH)	594	479	98.84%	95.42%
Black or African American (NH)	2	0	0.33%	0.00%
Native American or Alaska Native (NH)	0	0	0.00%	0.00%
Asian (NH)	0	2	0.00%	0.40%
Pacific Islander or Native Hawaiian (NH)	0	0	0.00%	0.00%
Some other race (NH)	0	2	0.00%	0.40%
Two or more races/Multiracial (NH)	0	3	0.00%	0.60%
Hispanic or Latino (any race)	5	16	0.83%	3.19%
Total	601	502		

As of the 2020 United States census, there were 502 people, 427 households, and 214 families residing in the town.

As of the 2010 United States census, there were 601 people, 407 households, and 218 families residing in the town.

=== 2000 census ===
As of the census of 2000, there were 411 people, 266 households, and 129 families residing in the town. The population density was 5,912.5 inhabitants per square mile (2,282.8/km^{2}). There were 534 housing units at an average density of 7,682.0 per square mile (2,966.0/km^{2}). The racial makeup of the town was 99.27% White, 0.49% Asian, and 0.24% from other races. Hispanic or Latino of any race were 0.49% of the population.

In 2000, there were 266 households, out of which 1.9% had children under the age of 18 living with them, 44.7% were married couples living together, 2.6% had a female householder with no husband present, and 51.5% were non-families. 48.5% of all households were made up of individuals, and 34.2% had someone living alone who was 65 years of age or older. The average household size was 1.55 and the average family size was 2.06.

In 2000, in the town, the population was skewed toward mostly older persons with 1.9% under the age of 18, 1.5% from 18 to 24, 4.9% from 25 to 44, 25.3% from 45 to 64, and 66.4% who were 65 years of age or older. The median age was 70 years. For every 100 females, there were 77.9 males. For every 100 females age 18 and over, there were 76.0 males.

In 2000, the median income for a household in the town was $34,583, and the median income for a family was $55,500. Males had a median income of $31,250 versus $33,333 for females. The per capita income for the town was $35,338. About 1.5% of families and 6.6% of the population were below the poverty line, including none of those under age 18 and 5.6% of those age 65 or over.

As of 2000, speakers of English as a first language accounted for 100% of all residents. It, along with Cloud Lake, and Golf, and Jupiter Inlet Colony were the only municipalities in Palm Beach county with all residents having the mother tongue of English.
