= Gun Club Estates, Florida =

- CDP
- Interactive map of Gun Club Estates, Florida
- Coordinates: 26°40′31″N 80°06′29″W
- Country: United States
- State: Florida
- County: Palm Beach

Area
  - Total: 0.13 sq mi (0.33 km^{2})
  - Land: 0.12 sq mi (0.31 km^{2})
  - Water: 0.0077 sq mi (0.02 km^{2})
- Elevation: 16 ft (4.9 m)

Population (2020)
  - Total: 816
  - Density: 6,831.7/sq mi (2,637.75/km^{2})
- Time zone: UTC-5 (Eastern (EST))
  - Summer (DST): UTC-4 (EDT)
- ZIP code: 33406
- Area codes: 561, 728
- FIPS code: 12-28305
- GNIS feature ID: 2402558

Gun Club Estates is a census-designated place (CDP) in Palm Beach County, Florida, United States. It is part of the Miami metropolitan area of South Florida. The population was 816 at the 2020 US census.

== History ==
The CDP and Gun Club Road are both named after the Palm Beach Gun Club, a skeet and target shooting range that originally opened in the town of Palm Beach in 1911 and remained there until relocating to the modern-day Gun Club Estates area prior to the Korean War. A biography on Arthur Jackson dating to approximately 1952 notes that during the war, military personnel stationed at PBI (then known as the Palm Beach Air Force Base) used the gun ranges for training. By the mid-1950s, however, the owners of the club relocated it to just north of the intersection of Jog Road and Lake Worth Road (State Road 802) as homes for Gun Club Estates were being constructed.

== Geography ==
According to the United States Census Bureau, the CDP has a total area of 0.3 km^{2} (0.1 mi^{2}), all land.

The CDP is located in an unincorporated area near the southwest corner of President Donald J. Trump International Airport and is bounded by West Palm Beach Canal on the north, Kirk Road on the east, Gun Club Road on the south, and Military Trail (State Road 809) on the west.

== Demographics ==
Historical population
Census	Pop.	Note	%±
2000	711		—
2010	776		9.1%
2020	816		5.2%
U.S. Decennial Census

=== 2020 census ===
Gun Club Estates racial composition (Hispanics excluded from racial categories) (NH = Non-Hispanic)
Race	Number	Percentage
White (NH)	113	13.85%
Black or African American (NH)	75	9.19%
Native American or Alaska Native (NH)	0	0.00%
Asian (NH)	5	0.61%
Pacific Islander or Native Hawaiian (NH)	0	0.00%
Some Other Race (NH)	0	0.00%
Mixed/Multiracial (NH)	10	1.23%
Hispanic or Latino (any race)	613	75.12%
Total	816	100.00%

As of the 2020 United States census, there were 816 people, 342 households, and 134 families residing in the CDP.

=== 2010 census ===
Gun Club Estates racial composition (Hispanics excluded from racial categories) (NH = Non-Hispanic)
Race	Number	Percentage
White (NH)	230	29.64%
Black or African American (NH)	50	6.44%
Native American or Alaska Native (NH)	0	0.00%
Asian (NH)	8	1.03%
Pacific Islander or Native Hawaiian (NH)	0	0.00%
Some Other Race (NH)	2	0.26%
Mixed/Multiracial (NH)	0	0.00%
Hispanic or Latino (any race)	486	62.63%
Total	776	100.00%

As of the 2010 United States census, there were 776 people, 275 households, and 227 families residing in the CDP.

=== 2000 census ===
At the 2000 census, there were 711 people, 250 households and 182 families living in the CDP. The population density was 2,287.7/km^{2} (6,010.7/mi^{2}). There were 268 housing units at an average density of 862.3/km^{2} (2,265.7/mi^{2}). The racial makeup of the CDP was 87.34% White (55.8% were Non-Hispanic White), 2.25% African American, 0.14% Native American, 0.14% Asian, 3.52% from other races, and 6.61% from two or more races. Hispanic or Latino of any race were 39.80% of the population.

In 2000, there were 250 households, of which 34.8% had children under the age of 18 living with them, 45.2% were married couples living together, 17.2% had a female householder with no husband present, and 26.8% were non-families. 17.2% of all households were made up of individuals, and 5.2% had someone living alone who was 65 years of age or older. The average household size was 2.84 and the average family size was 3.09.

In 2000, 26.2% of the population were under the age of 18, 9.3% from 18 to 24, 36.0% from 25 to 44, 21.2% from 45 to 64, and 7.3% who were 65 years of age or older. The median age was 34 years. For every 100 females, there were 108.5 males. For every 100 females age 18 and over, there were 105.9 males.

In 2000, the median household income was $33,380, and the median family income was $28,375. Males had a median income of $19,943 compared with $21,372 for females. The per capita income for the CDP was $12,560. None of the families and 3.7% of the population were living below the poverty line, including no under eighteens and none of those over 64.

As of 2000, English was the first language for 53.50% of all residents, while Spanish was the mother tongue for 46.49% of the population.
