= Glen Ridge, Florida =

- Town
- Town of Glen Ridge
- Location of Glen Ridge, Florida
- Coordinates: 26°40′17″N 80°04′30″W
- Country: United States
- State: Florida
- County: Palm Beach
- Founded: 1932
- Incorporated: December 11, 1947

Government
  - Type: Council-Manager
  - Mayor: Alice McLane
  - Council Members: Taylor Jantz, Leila Rothe, Kevin Wellman, Thomas Lisi, and Eusebio Morales
  - Town Manager: John J. Deal
  - Town Attorney: B. Douglas MacGibbon

Area
  - Total: 0.19 sq mi (0.50 km^{2})
  - Land: 0.17 sq mi (0.44 km^{2})
  - Water: 0.019 sq mi (0.05 km^{2})
- Elevation: 10 ft (3.0 m)

Population (2020)
  - Total: 217
  - Density: 1,269.6/sq mi (490.21/km^{2})
- Time zone: UTC-5 (Eastern (EST))
  - Summer (DST): UTC-4 (EDT)
- ZIP code: 33406
- Area codes: 561, 728
- FIPS code: 12-26050
- GNIS feature ID: 2406576
- Website: www.townofglenridgefl.com

Glen Ridge is a town and registered bird sanctuary in Palm Beach County, Florida, United States. It is part of the Miami metropolitan area of South Florida. The population was 217 in the 2020 US census.

== History ==
In 1932, the Trout family constructed and moved into the first house built in the area that became Glen Ridge. Twin brothers Kenyon and Karl Riddle purchased land west of the Seaboard Air Line Railroad, south of Southern Boulevard, and northeast of the West Palm Beach Canal in 1935. For reasons not entirely certain, the housing development split, with part of it becoming the neighboring town of Cloud Lake, in 1951. Glen Ridge, a 100 acres (40 ha) municipality, was incorporated on December 11, 1947, and received its name by resident Helen Mosler's suggestion, stating that the wooded canal bank resembled the ridge of a glen.

Upon incorporation, residents elected John D. Watts as mayor; Ernest T. Delburn, Allison T. French, Max Mosler, Richard W. Owen, and John B. Tschirgi as aldermen; Josephyne H. French as town clerk; and John P. Stine as town manager. Three years later, the 1950 census recorded a population of 126 in Glen Ridge. Council elections were held in the mayor's garage and meetings occurred in the members' houses through the mid-1990s, when the town began renting a storefront along Southern Boulevard. Glen Ridge opened a permanent town hall and community center in September 2002, after expending approximately $110,000 to repurpose a former residence. A 2014 Palm Beach Post profile on Glen Ridge reported that the town contained about 100 homes and levied no property taxes. Glen Ridge was also described as a bird sanctuary because the "dense green foliage forms a canopy over the street as you drive in."

== Geography ==
According to the United States Census Bureau, the town has a total area of 0.2 square miles (0.52 km^{2}), all land.

=== Climate ===
The Town of Glen Ridge has a tropical climate, similar to the climate found in much of the Caribbean. It is part of the only region in the 48 contiguous states that falls under that category. More specifically, it generally has a tropical savanna climate (Köppen climate classification: Aw), bordering a tropical monsoon climate (Köppen climate classification: Am).

== Demographics ==
Historical population
Census	Pop.	Note	%±
1950	126		—
1960	226		79.4%
1970	216		−4.4%
1980	235		8.8%
1990	207		−11.9%
2000	276		33.3%
2010	219		−20.7%
2020	217		−0.9%
U.S. Decennial Census

=== 2010 and 2020 census ===
Glen Ridge racial composition (Hispanics excluded from racial categories) (NH = Non-Hispanic)
Race	Pop 2010	Pop 2020	% 2010	% 2020
White (NH)	152	144	69.41%	66.36%
Black or African American (NH)	3	6	1.37%	2.77%
Native American or Alaska Native (NH)	2	0	0.91%	0.00%
Asian (NH)	0	5	0.00%	2.30%
Pacific Islander or Native Hawaiian (NH)	0	0	0.00%	0.00%
Some other race (NH)	0	0	0.00%	0.00%
Two or more races/Multiracial (NH)	0	4	0.00%	1.84%
Hispanic or Latino (any race)	62	58	28.31%	26.73%
Total	219	217	100.00%	100.00%

As of the 2020 United States census, there were 217 people, 82 households, and 58 families residing in the town.

As of the 2010 United States census, there were 219 people, 95 households, and 54 families residing in the town.

=== 2000 census ===
As of the census of 2000, there were 276 people, 96 households, and 67 families residing in the town. The population density was 1,222.9 inhabitants per square mile (472.2/km^{2}). There were 105 housing units at an average density of 465.2 per square mile (179.6/km^{2}). The racial makeup of the town was 81.88% White (71.4% were Non-Hispanic White), 9.06% African American, 0.72% Native American, 0.36% Asian, and 7.97% from two or more races. Hispanic or Latino of any race were 10.87% of the population.

As of 2000, there were 96 households, out of which 36.5% had children under the age of 18 living with them, 50.0% were married couples living together, 10.4% had a female householder with no husband present, and 29.2% were non-families. 18.8% of all households were made up of individuals, and 8.3% had someone living alone who was 65 years of age or older. The average household size was 2.88 and the average family size was 3.35.

In 2000, in the town, the population was spread out, with 30.1% under the age of 18, 5.1% from 18 to 24, 29.3% from 25 to 44, 21.7% from 45 to 64, and 13.8% who were 65 years of age or older. The median age was 36 years. For every 100 females, there were 98.6 males. For every 100 females age 18 and over, there were 85.6 males.

In 2000, the median income for a household in the town was $39,500, and the median income for a family was $51,563. Males had a median income of $24,643 versus $29,583 for females. The per capita income for the town was $21,871. About 3.1% of families and 4.8% of the population were below the poverty line, including 1.7% of those under the age of eighteen and 7.0% of those 65 or over.

As of 2000, speakers of English as a first language accounted for 91.30% of all residents, while Spanish as a mother tongue made up 8.69% of the population.
