= Golf, Florida =

- Village
- Village of Golf
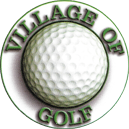
- Seal

- Location of Village of Golf, Florida
- Coordinates: 26°30′05″N 80°06′27″W
- Country: United States
- State: Florida
- County: Palm Beach
- Founded: 1956
- Incorporated: May 30, 1957
- Named after: Golf, Illinois

Government
  - Type: Council-Manager
  - Mayor: Peter B. Hamilton
  - Vice Mayor: Robert C. Buchanan
  - Council Members: Angela Holiday, Betsy Hvide, and Jeffrey Kruck
  - Village Manager: Christine M. Thrower-Skinner
  - Village Clerk: Donn M. Lynn

Area
  - Total: 0.83 sq mi (2.15 km^{2})
  - Land: 0.82 sq mi (2.12 km^{2})
  - Water: 0.012 sq mi (0.03 km^{2})
- Elevation: 20 ft (6.1 m)

Population (2020)
  - Total: 255
  - Density: 310.9/sq mi (120.02/km^{2})
- Time zone: UTC-5 (Eastern (EST))
  - Summer (DST): UTC-4 (EDT)
- ZIP code: 33436
- Area codes: 561, 728
- FIPS code: 12-26550
- GNIS feature ID: 2407467
- Website: www.villageofgolf.org

Golf is a village in Palm Beach County, Florida, United States. It is part of the Miami metropolitan area of South Florida. As of the 2020 census, Golf had a population of 255.

== History ==
Golf was founded in the 1956 as a planned community on a golf course. As some of the early settlers were originally from Golf, Illinois, this was their preference for a name. The village was officially incorporated in 1957.

== Geography ==
According to the United States Census Bureau, the village has a total area of 0.8 square miles (2.1 km^{2}), of which 0.8 square miles (2.1 km^{2}) is land and 1.19% is water.

The village is completely landlocked and enveloped by the incorporated parts of the city of Boynton Beach to its east and south, while on its west and north it borders a few unincorporated suburbs and includes their golf courses, recreational parks, and wetlands (all of which also have Boynton Beach mailing addresses).

=== Climate ===
Golf has a tropical climate, similar to the climate found in much of the Caribbean. It is part of the only region in the 48 contiguous states that falls under that category. More specifically, it generally has a tropical savanna climate (Köppen climate classification: Aw), bordering a tropical monsoon climate (Köppen climate classification: Am).

== Demographics ==
Historical population
Census	Pop.	Note	%±
1960	35		—
1970	50		42.9%
1980	110		120.0%
1990	234		112.7%
2000	230		−1.7%
2010	252		9.6%
2020	255		1.2%
U.S. Decennial Census

=== 2010 and 2020 census ===
Golf racial composition (Hispanics excluded from racial categories) (NH = Non-Hispanic)
Race	Pop 2010	Pop 2020	% 2010	% 2020
White (NH)	249	249	98.81%	97.65%
Black or African American (NH)	1	0	0.40%	0.00%
Native American or Alaska Native (NH)	0	0	0.00%	0.00%
Asian (NH)	0	2	0.00%	0.78%
Pacific Islander or Native Hawaiian (NH)	0	0	0.00%	0.00%
Some other race (NH)	0	0	0.00%	0.00%
Two or more races/Multiracial (NH)	0	2	0.00%	0.78%
Hispanic or Latino (any race)	2	2	0.79%	0.78%
Total	252	255		

As of the 2020 United States census, there were 255 people, 124 households, and 101 families residing in the village.

As of the 2010 United States census, there were 252 people, 141 households, and 111 families residing in the village.

=== 2000 census ===
At the 2000 census there were 230 people, 119 households, and 84 families in the village. The population density was 277.2 inhabitants per square mile (107.0/km^{2}). There were 146 housing units at an average density of 176.0 per square mile (68.0/km^{2}). The racial makeup of the village was 97.39% White, 0.87% African American, 1.74% from other races. Hispanic or Latino of any race were 2.17%.

In 2000, of the 119 households, 9.2% had children under the age of 18 living with them, 68.1% were married couples living together, 1.7% had a female householder with no husband present, and 29.4% were non-families. 28.6% of households were one person and 26.1% were one person aged 65 or older. The average household size was 1.93 and the average family size was 2.31.

In 2000, the age distribution was 9.1% under the age of 18, 2.6% from 18 to 24, 6.1% from 25 to 44, 27.0% from 45 to 64, and 55.2% 65 or older. The median age was 67 years. For every 100 females, there were 91.7 males. For every 100 females age 18 and over, there were 88.3 males.

In 2000, the median household income was in excess of $200,000, as is the median family income. Males had a median income of over $100,000 versus $50,833 for females. The per capita income for the village was $144,956. None of the families and 1.7% of the population were below the poverty line. No one under 18 below poverty, and 3.4% of those 65 and older were living below the poverty line.

As of 2000, English as a first language accounted for 100% of the population. It, as well as Briny Breezes, Cloud Lake, and Jupiter Inlet Colony were the only municipalities in Palm Beach county with all residents having the mother tongue of English.
