= Pine Air, Florida =

- CDP
- Location within Florida
- Coordinates: 26°39′31″N 80°06′27″W
- Country: United States
- State: Florida
- County: Palm Beach

Area
  - Total: 0.31 sq mi (0.80 km^{2})
  - Land: 0.31 sq mi (0.80 km^{2})
  - Water: 0 sq mi (0.00 km^{2})
- Elevation: 20 ft (6.1 m)

Population (2020)
  - Total: 2,190
  - Density: 7,070.9/sq mi (2,730.08/km^{2})
- Time zone: UTC-5 (Eastern (EST))
  - Summer (DST): UTC-4 (EDT)
- ZIP code: 33406
- Area codes: 561, 728
- GNIS feature ID: 2628530

Pine Air is a census-designated place (CDP) in Palm Beach County, Florida, United States. It is a part of the Miami metropolitan area of South Florida. The population was 2,190 as of the 2020 census.

== Geography ==
It is bordered by Military Trail (State Road 809) to the west and the village of Palm Springs to the south.

== Demographics ==
Historical population
Census	Pop.	Note	%±
2010	2,024		—
2020	2,190		8.2%
U.S. Decennial Census

Pine Air first appeared as a census designated place in the 2010 U.S. census.

=== 2020 census ===
As of the 2020 census, Pine Air had a population of 2,190. The median age was 35.8 years. 24.1% of residents were under the age of 18 and 11.3% of residents were 65 years of age or older. For every 100 females there were 102.4 males, and for every 100 females age 18 and over there were 102.9 males age 18 and over.

100.0% of residents lived in urban areas, while 0.0% lived in rural areas.

There were 693 households in Pine Air, of which 37.8% had children under the age of 18 living in them. Of all households, 50.2% were married-couple households, 17.7% were households with a male householder and no spouse or partner present, and 23.2% were households with a female householder and no spouse or partner present. About 15.0% of all households were made up of individuals and 6.1% had someone living alone who was 65 years of age or older.

There were 716 housing units, of which 3.2% were vacant. The homeowner vacancy rate was 0.5% and the rental vacancy rate was 4.0%.

Pine Air racial composition (Hispanics excluded from racial categories) (NH = Non-Hispanic)
Race	Number	Percentage
White (NH)	400	18.26%
Black or African American (NH)	154	7.03%
Native American or Alaska Native (NH)	6	0.27%
Asian (NH)	38	1.74%
Pacific Islander or Native Hawaiian (NH)	0	0.00%
Some Other Race (NH)	14	0.64%
Mixed/Multiracial (NH)	36	1.64%
Hispanic or Latino	1,542	70.41%
Total	2,190	

=== Demographic estimates ===
According to the 2020 ACS 5-year estimates, there were 425 families residing in the CDP.

=== 2010 census ===
Pine Air racial composition (Hispanics excluded from racial categories) (NH = Non-Hispanic)
Race	Number	Percentage
White (NH)	584	28.85%
Black or African American (NH)	145	7.16%
Native American or Alaska Native (NH)	1	0.05%
Asian (NH)	30	1.48%
Pacific Islander or Native Hawaiian (NH)	0	0.00%
Some Other Race (NH)	5	0.25%
Mixed/Multiracial (NH)	8	0.40%
Hispanic or Latino	1,251	61.80%
Total	2,024	

As of the 2010 United States census, there were 2,024 people, 672 households, and 503 families residing in the CDP.
