= Acacia Villas, Florida =

- CDP
- Location of Acacia Villas in Palm Beach County, Florida.
- Coordinates: 26°38′45″N 80°06′38″W
- Country: United States
- State: Florida
- County: Palm Beach

Area
  - Total: 0.069 sq mi (0.18 km^{2})
  - Land: 0.069 sq mi (0.18 km^{2})
  - Water: 0 sq mi (0.00 km^{2})
- Elevation: 16 ft (4.9 m)

Population (2020)
  - Total: 398
  - Density: 5,659.9/sq mi (2,185.29/km^{2})
- Time zone: UTC-5 (Eastern (EST))
  - Summer (DST): UTC-4 (EDT)
- ZIP code: 33406
- Area codes: 561, 728
- GNIS feature ID: 2628517

Acacia Villas is a census-designated place (CDP) in Palm Beach County, Florida, United States. It is part of the Miami metropolitan area of South Florida. The population was 398 as of the 2020 census.

== Geography ==
Acacia Villas is located on the east side of Military Trail; it borders Palm Springs on its north, east, and south sides.

== Demographics ==
Historical population
Census	Pop.	Note	%±
2010	427		—
2020	398		−6.8%
U.S. Decennial Census

Acacia Villages first appeared as a census designated place in the 2010 U.S. census.

=== 2020 census ===
Acacia Villas CDP, Florida – Racial and ethnic composition Note: the US Census treats Hispanic/Latino as an ethnic category. This table excludes Latinos from the racial categories and assigns them to a separate category. Hispanics/Latinos may be of any race.
Race / Ethnicity (NH = Non-Hispanic)	Pop 2010	Pop 2020	% 2010	% 2020
White alone (NH)	99	85	23.19%	21.36%
Black or African American alone (NH)	37	9	8.67%	2.26%
Native American or Alaska Native alone (NH)	0	0	0.00%	0.00%
Asian alone (NH)	16	8	3.75%	2.01%
Native Hawaiian or Pacific Islander alone (NH)	0	0	0.00%	0.00%
Other race alone (NH)	1	2	0.23%	0.50%
Mixed race or Multiracial (NH)	4	14	0.94%	3.52%
Hispanic or Latino (any race)	270	280	63.23%	70.35%
Total	427	398	100.00%	100.00%

As of the 2020 United States census, there were 398 people, 149 households, and 107 families residing in the CDP.

=== 2010 census ===
As of the 2010 United States census, there were 427 people, 110 households, and 110 families residing in the CDP.
