= Cloud Lake, Florida =

Town in the state of Florida, United States

- Town
- Town of Cloud Lake
- Location of Cloud Lake in Palm Beach County, Florida
- Coordinates: 26°40′28″N 80°04′23″W
- Country: United States
- State: Florida
- County: Palm Beach
- Founded: 1935
- Incorporated: 1948

Government
  - Type: Mayor-Council
  - Mayor: Russell "Russ" E. Nidy
  - Vice Mayor: Marion Chateau-Flagg
  - Councilmembers: Kathleen "Katie" Hoock, John Tyson, and Alexandra Powell-Sardinas
  - Town Clerk: Dorothy C. Gravelin
  - Town Attorney: William P. Doney

Area
  - Total: 0.066 sq mi (0.17 km^{2})
  - Land: 0.054 sq mi (0.14 km^{2})
  - Water: 0.012 sq mi (0.03 km^{2})
- Elevation: 10 ft (3.0 m)

Population (2020)
  - Total: 134
  - Density: 2,480/sq mi (957.4/km^{2})
- Time zone: UTC-5 (Eastern (EST))
  - Summer (DST): UTC-4 (EDT)
- ZIP code: 33406
- Area codes: 561, 728
- FIPS code: 12-13050
- GNIS feature ID: 2406282
- Website: cloudlakefl.us

Cloud Lake is a town in Palm Beach County, Florida, United States. It is part of the Miami metropolitan area of South Florida. As of the 2020 US census, the town had a population of 134 residents.

== History ==
The Town of Cloud Lake was platted in 1935, and incorporated in 1948; it was built largely by the efforts of twin brothers Karl and Kenyon Riddle, the former of whom served as the city manager and superintendent of public works of West Palm Beach in the 1920s. The name is derived from Seminole Chief Yaholoochee, meaning "The Cloud".

== Geography ==
The town is bounded by Glen Ridge to the west and the south, State Road 80 to the north, and Interstate 95 to the east. According to the United States Census Bureau, the town has a total area of 0.1 square miles (0.26 km^{2}), all land.

The town is situated adjacent to Glen Ridge and West Palm Beach and is located near President Donald J. Trump International Airport.

=== Climate ===
Cloud Lake has a tropical climate, similar to the climate found in much of the Caribbean. It is part of the only region in the 48 contiguous states that falls under that category. More specifically, it generally has a tropical rainforest climate (Köppen climate classification: Af), bordering a tropical monsoon climate (Köppen climate classification: Am).

== Demographics ==
Historical population
Census	Pop.	Note	%±
1950	132		—
1960	148		12.1%
1970	136		−8.1%
1980	160		17.6%
1990	121		−24.4%
2000	167		38.0%
2010	135		−19.2%
2020	134		−0.7%
U.S. Decennial Census

=== 2010 and 2020 census ===
Cloud Lake racial composition (Hispanics excluded from racial categories) (NH = Non-Hispanic)
Race	Pop 2010	Pop 2020	% 2010	% 2020
White (NH)	96	67	71.11%	50.00%
Black or African American (NH)	8	4	5.93%	2.98%
Native American or Alaska Native (NH)	0	1	0.00%	0.75%
Asian (NH)	0	1	0.00%	0.75%
Pacific Islander or Native Hawaiian (NH)	0	0	0.00%	0.00%
Some other race (NH)	0	0	0.00%	0.00%
Two or more races/Multiracial (NH)	0	5	0.00%	3.73%
Hispanic or Latino (any race)	31	56	22.96%	41.79%
Total	135	134	100.00%	100.00%

As of the 2020 United States census, there were 134 people, 98 households, and 64 families residing in the town.

As of the 2010 United States census, there were 135 people, 77 households, and 46 families residing in the town.

=== 2000 census ===
As of the census of 2000, there were 167 people, 62 households, and 43 families residing in the town. The population density was 1,074.7/km^{2} (2,651.8/mi^{2}). There were 68 housing units at an average density of 437.6/km^{2} (1,079.8/mi^{2}). The racial makeup of the town was 87.43% White (68.9% Non-Hispanic White), 2.99% African American, 7.78% Asian, and 1.80% from two or more races. Hispanic or Latino of any race were 30.54% of the population.

In 2000, there were 62 households out of which 30.6% had children under the age of 18 living with them, 56.5% were married couples living together, 9.7% had a female householder with no husband present, and 30.6% were non-families. 25.8% of all households were made up of individuals and 9.7% had someone living alone who was 65 years of age or older. The average household size was 2.69 and the average family size was 3.33. The median income for a household in the town was $55,625, and the median income for a family was $57,292. Males had a median income of $31,250 versus $30,833 for females. The per capita income for the town was $24,311. None of the population or families were below the poverty line.

As of 2000, English was the first language of 100% of its residents. It, along with Briny Breezes, Golf, and Jupiter Inlet Colony were the only municipalities in Palm Beach county with all residents having the mother tongue of English.
