= Administrative divisions of Florida =

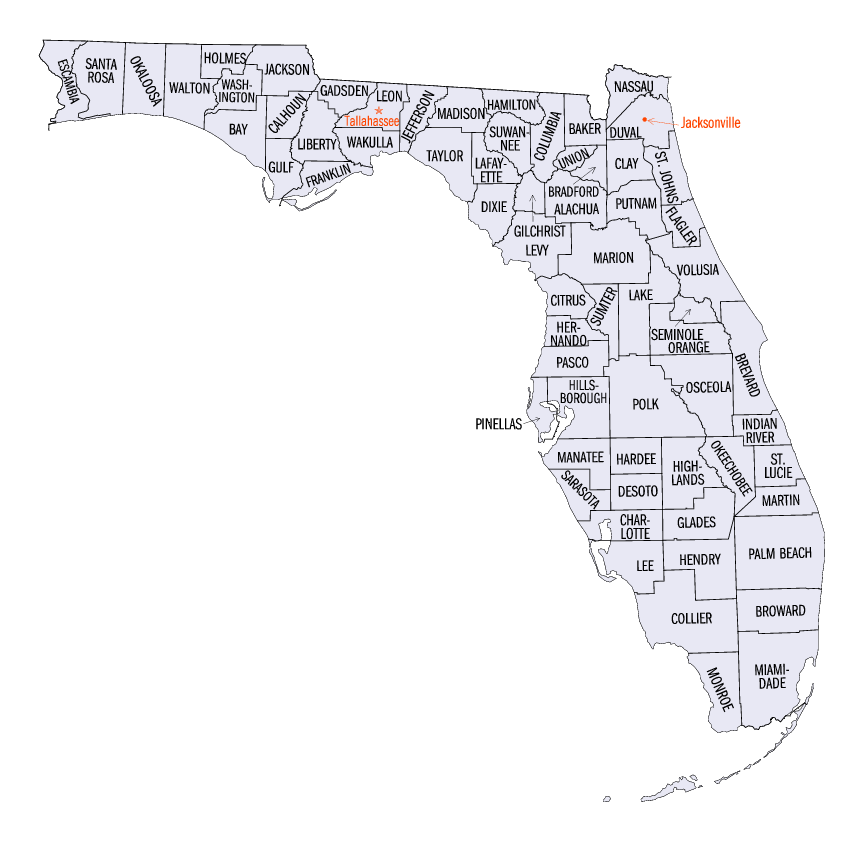
A map of Florida showing county names and boundaries

Local governments in Florida are established by the state government, and are given varying amounts of non-exclusive authority over their jurisdictions. The laws governing the creation of local governments are contained in the Florida Constitution and the Florida Statutes. Local governments are incorporated by special acts of the Florida Legislature. These include four types: counties, municipalities, school districts, and special districts.

In some cases, municipal and county governments have merged into a consolidated government. However, smaller municipal governments can be created inside of a consolidated municipality/county. In Jacksonville, the municipal government has taken over the responsibilities normally given to Duval County, and smaller municipalities exist within it.

Both counties and cities may have a legislative branch (commissions or councils) and executive branch (mayor or manager) and local police, but violations are brought before a county court. Counties and municipalities are authorized to pass laws (ordinances), levy taxes, and provide public services within their jurisdictions. Every area of Florida is in a county, but only some areas have been incorporated as municipalities. Every municipality is in a county, and the county jurisdiction overlays the municipal jurisdiction. If there is a conflict between a county ordinance and a municipal ordinance, the municipal ordinance usually has precedence within the municipality's borders; however, if the county has been designated a charter county by the Florida Legislature, the county's ordinances have precedence.

Counties and municipalities may create community development agencies, which may take part of the money from taxes on increases in property values from their area of interest. They then use the money received in reinvestment (improvements) in the area.

Local government is not required to pay for health care insurance for government retirees. As of 2010, none do.

In 2011, researchers at Florida State University said that Florida's cities and counties have promised pensions they cannot afford. Pension obligations constituted 8% of total spending by local governments in 2009.

== Counties ==
Florida has 67 counties, most of which are named for local or national political leaders. Some are named for Spanish explorers or conquistadors, marking the influence of 200 years of Spanish rule. Natural features of the region, including rivers, lakes, and flora, are also commonly used for county names. Florida has counties named for participants on both sides of Second Seminole War: Miami-Dade County is partially named for Francis L. Dade, a Major in the U.S. Army at the time; Osceola County is named for a Native American resistance leader during the war.

Each county has officers considered "state" officers, who are elected locally and have their offices and salaries paid for locally, but who cannot be removed or replaced locally; only the state governor has that authority. These are the sheriff, state attorney, public defender, tax collector, county clerk, a county appraiser who established the value of real estate for tax purposes, and county judges.

Each sheriff operates under Florida Statute 30.15.

By state law there is one school district in each of the counties in Florida.

To provide liquidity to counties when tax bills are not paid, Florida operates under the tax lien sale process, whereby liens are sold for the amount of back taxes, interest, and costs. In Florida, bidders bid on the rate of interest (beginning at 18%) they will accept; the bidder offering the lowest rate is awarded the tax lien certificate. Once a lien has been outstanding for approximately 22 months (technically, April 1 of the second year following the year when the tax lien was originally offered for sale), the tax lien holder may petition the circuit court (via the county tax collector) to begin the process for the tax deed sale of the property.

== Municipalities ==
Municipalities in Florida may be called towns, cities, or villages, but there is no legal distinction between the different terms. Municipalities often have police and fire departments, and provide essential services such as water, waste collection, etc. In unincorporated areas of a county, the county itself provides these services. Municipalities may also enter agreements with the county to have the county provide certain services. Each county has a sheriff who also tends to have concurrent jurisdiction with municipal police departments.

== School districts ==
There is one school district for each county; the Florida Constitution allows adjoining counties to merge their districts upon voter approval. The superintendent is by default an elected official; however, the Florida Constitution allows county voters to make the position an appointed one.

== Special districts ==
Among special districts are "community development districts" which have virtually all the power of a city or county (except, notably, they do not have police power). Chapter 190 of the Florida Statutes governs these districts. Notable CDD's include the Reedy Creek Improvement District (the location of Walt Disney World) and substantially all of The Villages (the giant Central Florida retirement community).

Many counties have a "Soil and Water Conservation District", a residue of Dust Bowl politics. Elected officials are unpaid. Much of their budget is spent on engineering staff. Critics are trying to dismantle these districts, as being obsolete.
