= Aircraft rescue and firefighting =

Emergency response to aircraft emergencies

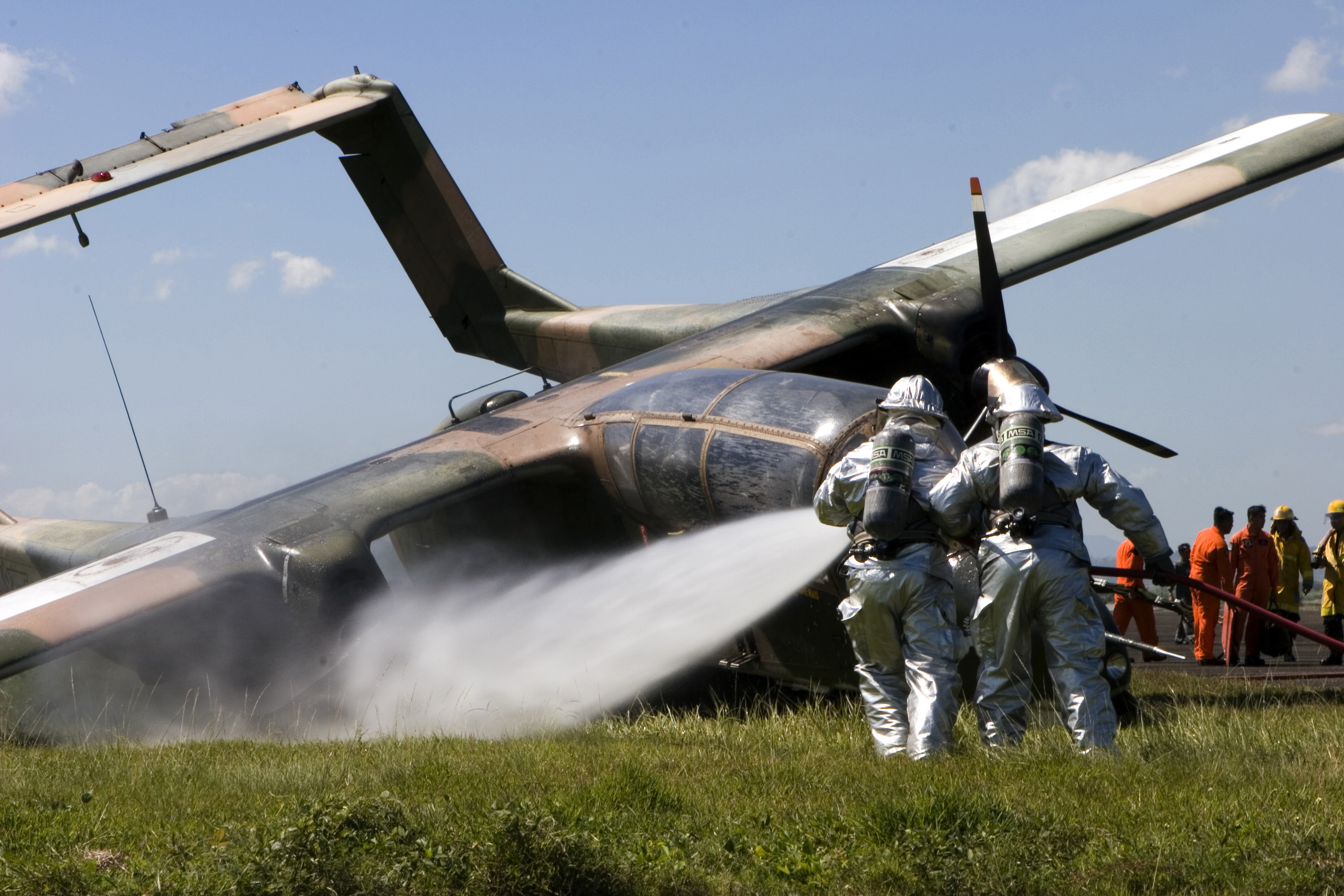
Firefighters at the scene of a crashed OV-10 Bronco.

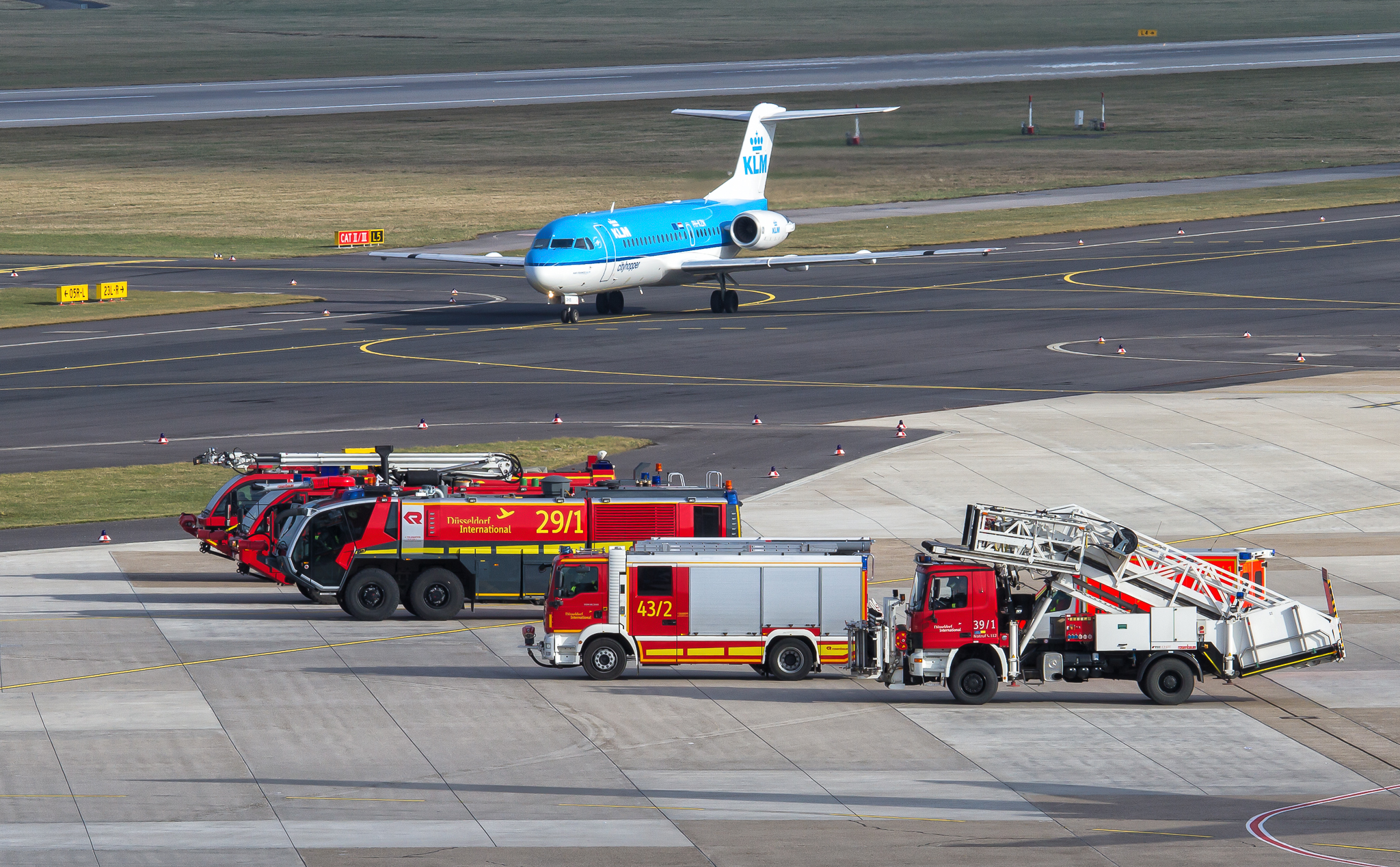
Firefighters at the Düsseldorf Airport, Germany

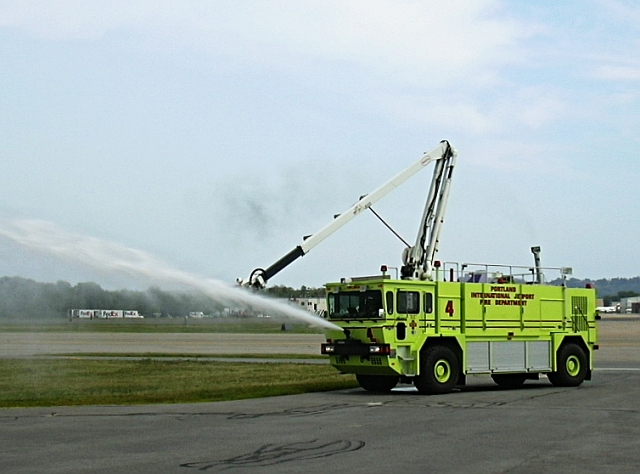
A demonstration of an airport crash tender's abilities at the Portland International Jetport

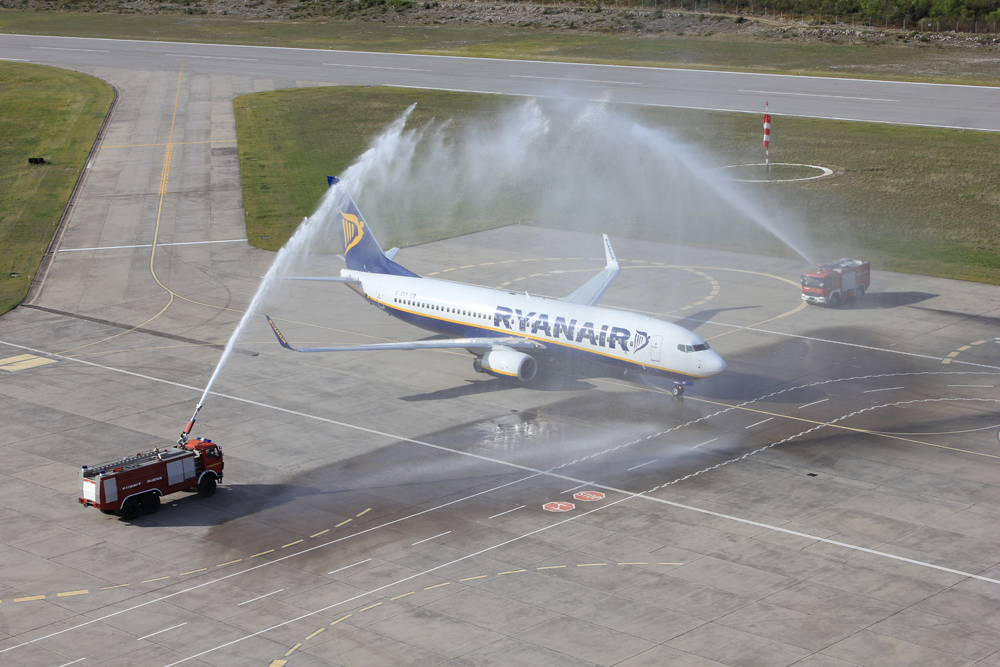
Firefighters conducting a water salute in Rijeka, Croatia

Aircraft rescue and firefighting (ARFF) is a type of firefighting that involves the emergency response, mitigation, evacuation, and rescue of passengers and crew of aircraft involved in aviation accidents and incidents.

Airports with scheduled passenger flights are obliged to have firefighters and firefighting apparatus on location ready for duty any time aircraft operate. Airports may have regulatory oversight by an arm of their individual national governments or voluntarily under standards of the International Civil Aviation Organization.

== Duties ==
Due to the mass casualty potential of an aviation emergency, the speed with which emergency response equipment and personnel arrive at the scene of the emergency is of paramount importance. Their arrival and initial mission to secure the aircraft against all hazards, particularly fire, increases the survivability of the passengers and crew on board. Airport firefighters have advanced training in the application of firefighting foams, dry chemical and clean agents used to extinguish burning aviation fuel in and around an aircraft in order to maintain a path for evacuating passengers to exit the fire hazard area. Further, should fire either be encountered in the cabin or extend there from an external fire, the ARFF responders must work to control/extinguish these fires as well.

Primary to the hazard mitigation and safe evacuation of ambulatory passengers is the need to perform rescue operations. Passengers unable to extricate themselves must be removed from the aircraft and provided medical care. This process is extremely labor-intensive, requiring both firefighters and support personnel. Due to the nature of a mass casualty incident, rescue workers employ triage to classify the victims and direct their efforts where they can maximize survival.

Subsequent to the emergency being declared under control, the ARFF function reverts to one of protecting the scene, eliminating any peripheral or slowly evolving hazards and assisting to preserve the scene for investigators.

In 2016, an Emirati fire fighter died from burns when trying to fight the fire in the Emirates Flight 521 crash. The man was the only fatality.

Due to the rarity of aircraft fires, firefighters often have other usual duties such as baggage loaders or security guards, which they have to abandon at fire alarms.

== Apparatus ==
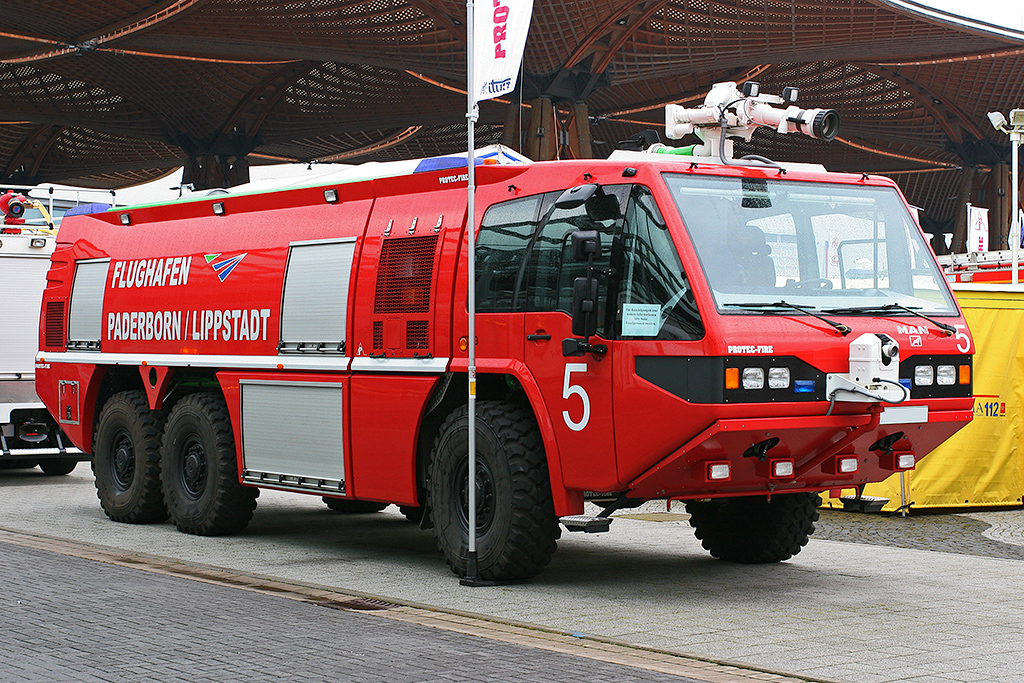
German Crash tender at Paderborn Lippstadt Airport

Specialized fire apparatus are required for the ARFF function, the design of which is predicated on many factors but primarily: speed, water-carrying capacity, off-road performance, and agent discharge rates. Since an accident could occur anywhere on or off airport property, sufficient water and other agents must be carried to contain the fire to allow for the best possibility of extinguishment, maximum possibility for evacuation and/or until additional resources arrive on the scene.

=== Personal protective equipment ===
Due to the intense radiant heat generated by burning fuels, firefighters wear protective ensembles that are coated with a silvered material to reflect heat away from their bodies, called a fire proximity suit, which are aluminized to reflect up to 90% of radiant heat, allowing them to work near high-temperature fires for limited periods. They also must wear self-contained breathing apparatus to provide a source of clean air, enabling them to work in the presence of smoke or other super-heated gases, such as when making entry into the burning cabin of an aircraft.

== ARFF in the United States ==
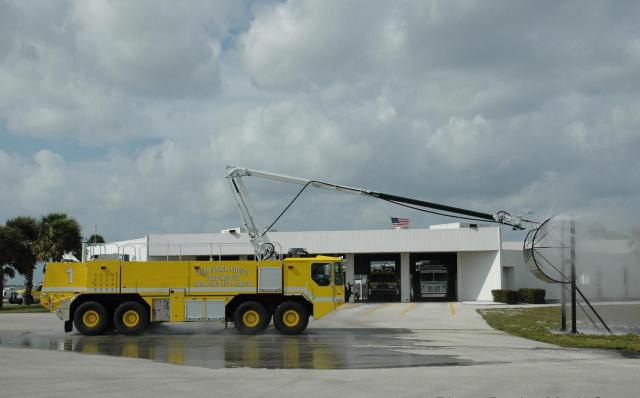
Dragon 1 of Palm Beach County Fire-Rescue at Palm Beach International Airport in West Palm Beach, Florida demonstrates use of its snozzle.

The Federal Aviation Administration (FAA) mandates ARFF operations at all U.S. airports that serve scheduled passenger air carriers. These are the only civilian fire protection services that are specifically regulated by any governmental entity. Military bases may have their own ARFF services with specialized duties and training.

Airports required to have ARFF services are inspected at least annually by the FAA for compliance with FAR, Part 139. Military ARFF operations must meet the mission requirements for their individual branch of the service.

In many cases the FAA will perform the investigatory duties after an incident, but in instances where significant injuries or any fatal accident the National Transportation Safety Board (NTSB) will investigate and the ARFF contingent will assist where needed.

=== Airport index ===
An index is assigned to each FAA Part 139 certificate holder based on a combination of the air carrier aircraft length and the average number of daily departures. If the longest air carrier aircraft at the airport has five or more average daily departures, the matching index is used. If the longest aircraft has less than five average daily departures, the next lower index is used. That index determines the required number of ARFF vehicles and required amount of extinguishing agents.

Index	Aircraft length	Vehicles	Extinguishing agents
A	<90 ft (<27m)	1	either 500 pounds of sodium-based dry chemical, halon 1211, or clean agent; or 450 pounds of potassium-based dry chemical and water with a commensurate quantity of AFFF to total 100 gallons for simultaneous dry chemical and AFFF application.
B	90 ft (27m) to <126 ft (<38m)	1	500 pounds of sodium-based dry chemical, halon 1211, or clean agent and 1,500 gallons of water and the commensurate quantity of AFFF for foam production
B	90 ft (27m) to <126 ft (<38m)	2	one vehicle carrying the extinguishing agents as specified for Index A; and one vehicle carrying an amount of water and the commensurate quantity of AFFF so the total quantity of water for foam production carried by both vehicles is at least 1,500 gallons.
C	126 ft (38m) to <159 ft (<48m)	2	one vehicle carrying the extinguishing agents as specified for Index B; and one vehicle carrying water and the commensurate quantity of AFFF so the total quantity of water for foam production carried by both vehicles is at least 3,000 gallons
C	126 ft (38m) to <159 ft (<48m)	3	one vehicle carrying the extinguishing agents as specified for Index A; and two vehicles carrying an amount of water and the commensurate quantity of AFFF so the total quantity of water for foam production carried by all three vehicles is at least 3,000 gallons
D	159 ft (48m) to <200 ft (<61m)	3	one vehicle carrying the extinguishing agents as specified for Index A; and two vehicles carrying an amount of water and the commensurate quantity of AFFF so the total quantity of water for foam production carried by all three vehicles is at least 4,000 gallons
E	200 ft (61m) and longer	3	one vehicle carrying the extinguishing agents as specified for Index A; and two vehicles carrying an amount of water and the commensurate quantity of AFFF so the total quantity of water for foam production carried by all three vehicles is at least 6,000 gallons

== See also ==
- Airport crash tender
- Water salute
