= Quint (fire apparatus) =

Combination fire engine and ladder truck

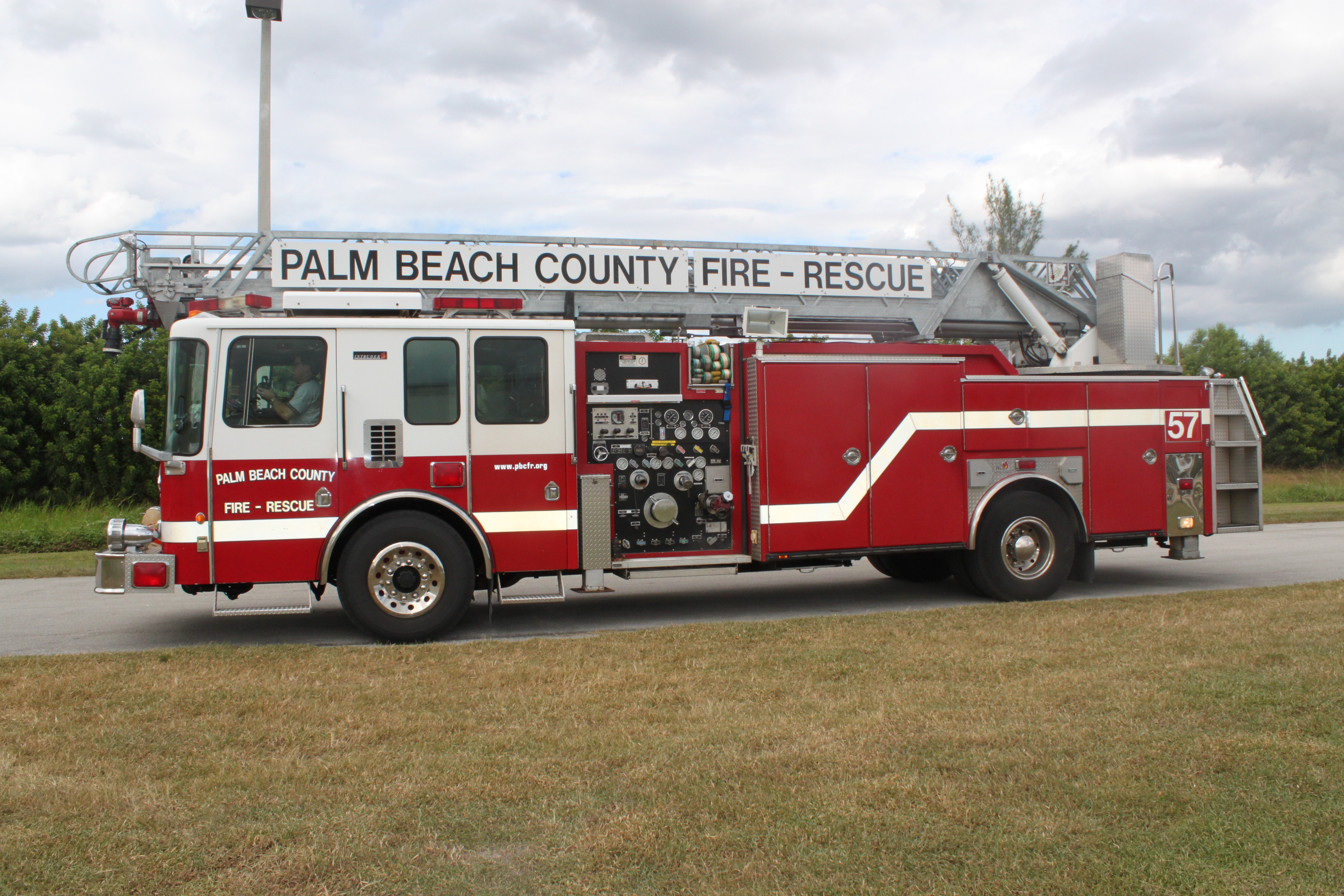
Palm Beach County Fire-Rescue Quint 57, stationed in suburban Boca Raton, Florida: This unit was manufactured by Ferrara Fire Apparatus, and is an example of a typical US quint setup.

A quintuple combination pumper or quint is a fire-fighting apparatus that serves the dual purpose of an engine and a ladder truck. "Quintuple" refers to the five functions that a quint provides: pump, water tank, fire hose, aerial device, and ground ladders. Tillers and tractor-drawn aerials also have quint features, and are dubbed "quillers".
