= Trauma Hawk Aero-Medical Program =

Air ambulance for Palm Beach County, Florida

Traumahawk Air Ambulance
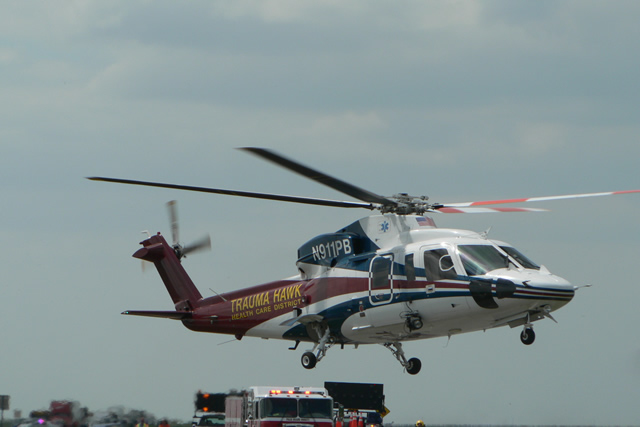
- Departing a crash scene with a trauma victim.

Multi-Department Specifications
- Air Ambulance Establishment: Multi-Department Establishment in 1990
- Helicopter(s) Owner/Operator: Health Care District of Palm Beach County
- Medical Treatment Provider: Palm Beach County Fire-Rescue

Helicopter Specifications
- Make: Leonardo AW169
- Year Made: 2023
- Amount: 2

Staffing
- Multi Department Crew
- Pilot/Flight Crew: 1 - Health Care District
- Medical Crew: 2 - Palm Beach County Fire-Rescue
- Medical Crew (EXT): Palm Beach County Fire-Rescue Paramedic & RN

Miscellaneous
- Average Daily Flights: 2-5

The Trauma Hawk Aero-Medical Program provides air ambulance services for Palm Beach County, Florida. On-scene paramedics will decide whether or not a Traumahawk is necessary in a situation. On average, a Traumahawk is dispatched between 1 and 5 times a day for traumatic injuries, including those from vehicle accidents to sports injuries, as well as transport for stroke and cardiac patients. Operated by the Health Care District of Palm Beach County, the service uses two identical 1999 Sikorsky S76-C+ helicopters as air ambulances.

== History ==
Prior to 1990, Palm Beach County Sheriff's Office helicopters were used for air transport of critically ill and injured patients to area hospitals. With Palm Beach County's population rapidly growing, it was evident that a formal countywide Trauma System was necessary. In November 1990, the Trauma Hawk Aero-Medical Transport Program was established with the purchase of a Bell 412 helicopter. The mission of the program is to save lives and reduce injury mortality through the rapid transport of patients to specialized healthcare facilities such as; trauma, burn, spinal cord, and pediatric hospitals. The helicopter was owned by the Health Care District of Palm Beach County. Originally, the Palm Beach County Sheriff's Department provided the pilots and performed the maintenance, and Palm Beach County Fire-Rescue provided two flight Paramedics.

Today, Palm Beach County Fire-Rescue and the Health Care District operate two air ambulances in Palm Beach County. The two Sikorsky S76-C+ Trauma Hawk air ambulances are identically equipped helicopters that can carry two patients each and up to four medical attendants if needed. The aircraft are available to respond and provide emergency services to all municipalities throughout Palm Beach County. On special occasions, the Traumahawk will be asked to provide emergency transportation for hospitals, and other Fire-Rescue departments throughout the state.

== General information ==
The two Traumahawks are hangared at Palm Beach Int'l Airport in West Palm Beach, FL. They are located at the South-East corner of the airport, next to the Palm Beach County Sheriff's Office hangar.

=== Crew Assignments ===
Each helicopter is staffed with one pilot, one Registered Nurse (RN) and one Paramedic. The RN's and paramedics are Palm Beach County Fire Rescue employees. Palm Beach County Fire Rescue maintains the Advance Life Support Transport License issued by the State of Florida. The pilots are Health Care District (HCD) employees.

=== How the Traumahawk is dispatched ===
To the Palm Beach County Fire-Rescue Communications Center (dispatch), the Traumahawk Hangar is known as "Station 82". When alerted to standby for an incident, the crews are paged as "TH A" for the primary crew, and "TH B" for the secondary crew; once the aircraft is requested to respond, the Traumahawks are referred to as "Traumahawk 1" or "Traumahawk 2". They receive pages and alerts just like every other fire station in the county. When Fire-Rescue arrives on the scene (vehicle accident, misc. traumatic injury, fall, etc.), Paramedics will assess the situation, and request that the Traumahawk be dispatched to the scene, via portable radios. In some cases, the dispatcher may automatically dispatch Traumahawk based on information that a 9-1-1 caller will give when calling in an emergency. The dispatcher will then page Traumahawk, and a crew will prepare for takeoff. Unless the call meets the criteria for an "auto-fly" (confirmed shooting, multiple calls for a bad vehicle crash, etc.), the crew does not fly until on-scene Paramedics verify the situation to meet either "Trauma Alert", "Cardiac Alert", or "Stroke Alert" criteria, and they are told to do so by Dispatch. Both of the helicopters, as well as each crew member have portable radios for communication. Each radio is programmed with miscellaneous channels and Talkgroups within the Palm Beach County Motorola Type II SmartZone Radio System. (wiki) These radios are used to communicate with dispatch, police, and Fire-Rescue Paramedics already on the scene. Most often, they are used to getting patient/stability information from Paramedics on the ground, before they arrive. Once the patient is on board, the crew will change their radio channel to the hospital's radio channel, to which they are transporting. This communication structure has been demonstrated numerous times in the T.V. Shows "EMERGENCY!" and "ER".

== Gallery ==
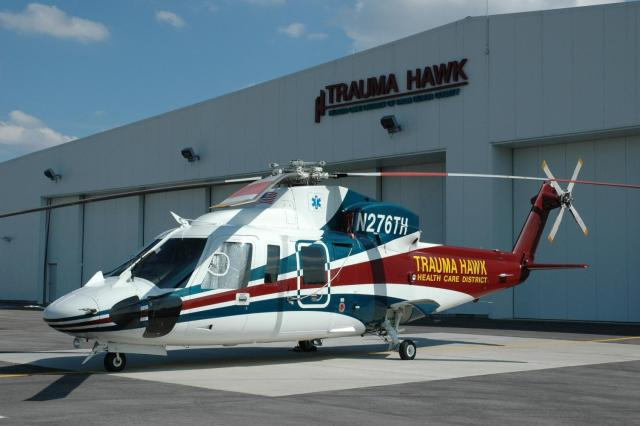
Traumahawk 1 at its hangar at Palm Beach Int'l Airport

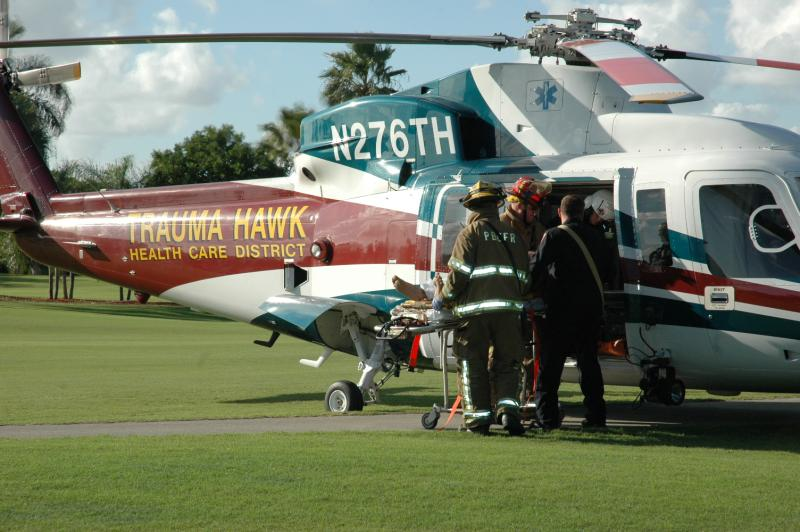
Palm Beach County Firefighter/Paramedics load a construction accident victim for transport.

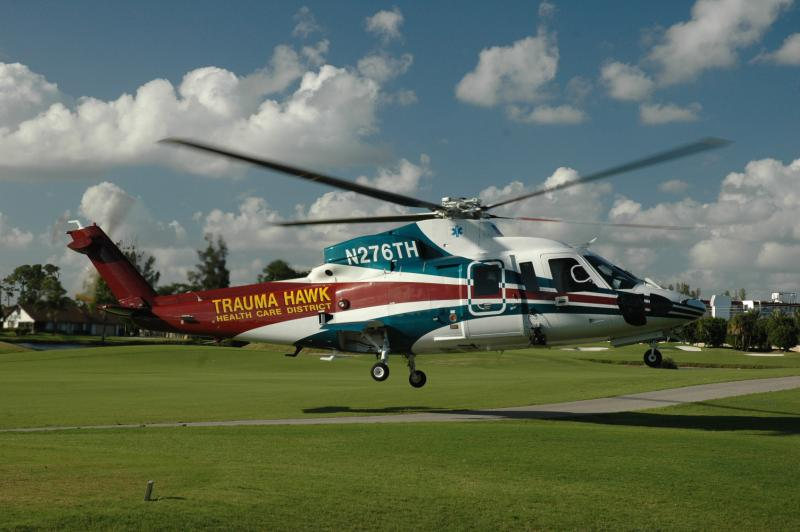
The Traumahawk ascends for take-off to a trauma center.

Palm Beach County Firefighter/Paramedics load a vehicle accident victim for transport.

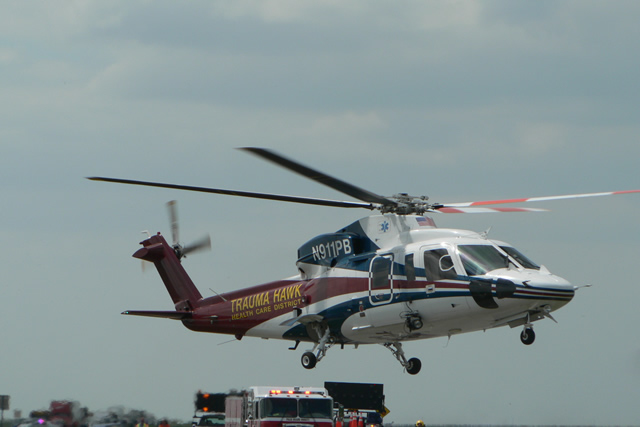
The Traumahawk ascends for take-off to a trauma center.

== See also ==
- Palm Beach County Fire-Rescue
- Air Ambulance
- Traumatic Injury
- Advanced Life Support (ALS)
- Emergency Medical Services
- Paramedic
- Registered Nurse
- Emergency medical technician
- Fire apparatus
- Palm Beach International Airport
