= Palm Beach County Fire Rescue =

Fire rescue agency for Palm Beach County, Florida, US

Coordinates: 26°42′N 80°3′W

Operational area
- Country: United States
- State: Florida
- County: Palm Beach

Agency overview
- Established: October 1st 1984; 42 years ago
- Annual calls: 156,526 (FY 2025)
- Employees: 2,057 (plus 100 volunteers)
- Annual budget: $847 million (FY 2025)
- Staffing: Career
- Fire chief: Patrick Kennedy
- EMS level: ALS
- IAFF: 2928
- Motto: “Excellence Today, Improving Tomorrow”

Facilities and equipment
- Battalions: 9
- Stations: 51
- Engines: 41
- Ladders: 6
- Squads: 4
- Ambulances: 55
- Tenders: 4
- HAZMAT: 2
- USAR: 2
- Airport crash: 4
- Wildland: 19
- Helicopters: 2
- Light and air: 1

Website
- Official website
- IAFF website

Palm Beach County Fire Rescue (PBCFR) is one of the largest fire departments in the state of Florida. With 52 stations, Palm Beach County Fire Rescue provides fire protection, Advanced Life Support emergency medical services, technical rescue, hazardous materials mitigation, aircraft rescue/firefighting, fire investigation, and 911 dispatching for unincorporated parts of Palm Beach County, Florida as well as 19 cities under contract.

== History ==
Palm Beach County Fire Rescue was created on October 1, 1984, when the Palm Beach County Board of County Commissioners passed a resolution consolidating the existing fire districts in Palm Beach County. Prior to 1984, the following fire districts were in existence, covering the mostly unincorporated Palm Beach County:

- Jupiter-Tequesta
- Juno Beach
- Old Dixie
- Military Park
- Southwest
- Trail Park
- Reservation
- Del Trail
- Canal Point
- Palm Beach International Airport

== Chief Herman W. Brice Fire Rescue Complex ==
Named after the department's first fire chief, the Palm Beach County Fire Rescue Administration and Training Complex is a 40-acre complex that houses Fire-Rescue's administrative offices, training areas, and an apparatus and support building. The complex, located at 405 Pike Road, includes multiple classrooms and conference rooms, a 6-story training tower, a 2 1/2-story Class A burn building, an emergency vehicle driving course, an extrication training area, an Urban Search & Rescue (USAR) props, a 10-acre lake for drafting training, and a field of various full-scale liquefied petroleum (LP) gas props.

== Structure ==
The department is made up of 8 battalions, which contain anywhere from three to nine fire stations:

- Battalion 1: 7 stations: serving the north county area (Jupiter, Juno Beach, Lake Park, Jupiter Farms, Palm Beach Country Estates).
- Battalion 2: 9 stations: serving the western county area (Royal Palm Beach, Wellington, Loxahatchee/Acreage, Loxahatchee Groves, Westlake).
- Battalion 3: 7 stations: serving Lake Worth, Lantana, Manalapan, South Palm Beach, Lake Clarke Shores.
- Battalion 4: 9 stations: serving suburban Boynton Beach Suburban Delray Beach.
- Battalion 5: 7 stations: serving suburban Boca Raton (Boca West, Loggers Run, Mission Bay, Sandalfoot Cove).
- Battalion 7: 3 stations: serving the Glades area (Pahokee, Canal Point, Belle Glade, South Bay).
- Battalion 8: 2 stations: Station 81 (Palm Beach International Airport) and Trauma Hawk.
- Battalion 9 (Special Operations): 2 stations: Station 19 and Station 34
- Battalion 10: 6 stations: serving unincorporated West Palm Beach, Lake Worth Beach, Palm Springs, Haverhill, Cloud Lake.

Each battalion is managed by a district chief, who oversees all three shifts in their respective battalion. At the shift level, each battalion is supervised by a battalion chief and an EMS Captain.

The department operates the following pieces of apparatus:

- Battalion Chiefs: 10
- EMS Captains: 10
- ALS Engines: 41
- ALS Aerials: 6
- ALS Squads: 4
- ALS Rescues: 55
- Special Operations: 2
- Tenders: 4
- Brush Trucks: 19
- Airport Crash (ARFF): 4
- Helicopters: 2
- Light and Air: 1

== Operations ==
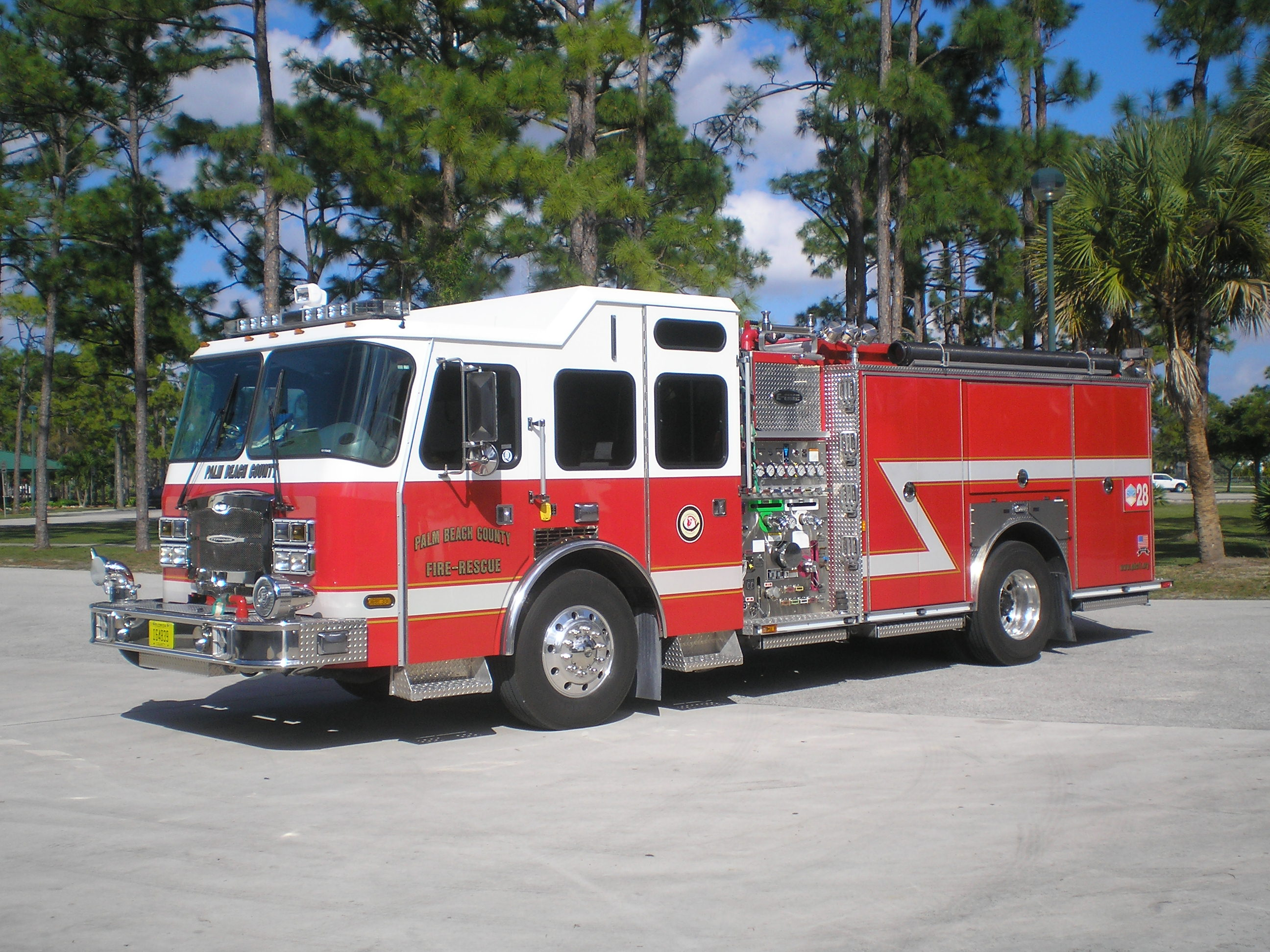
Engine 28

=== Overview ===
The department is responsible for 1,813 square miles (4,700 km^{2}), providing services to almost 900,000 residents throughout the county. Along with the unincorporated areas of the county, PBCFR provides services for Belle Glade, Cloud Lake, Glen Ridge, Haverhill, Juno Beach, Jupiter, Lake Clarke Shores, Lake Park, Lake Worth Beach, Lantana, Loxahatchee Groves, Manalapan, Pahokee, Palm Springs, Royal Palm Beach, South Bay, South Palm Beach, Wellington and Westlake.

All line personnel are either dual-certified Firefighter/EMT's or Firefighter/Paramedics. All Engine Companies, Squad Companies, Truck Companies, Ladder Companies, and Rescue Companies are Advanced Life Support (ALS) units, which means that they are staffed daily with paramedics. The department's daily minimum staffing requirement is 354 firefighters.

Apparatus Types:

- Engine Companies: Pumpers that carry 750–1,000 gallons of water, firefighting equipment, and medical equipment.
- Ladder Companies: Conventional (Straight-Stick) Quints that carry approximately 500 gallons of water, firefighting equipment, and medical equipment.
- Truck Companies: Platform (Tower-Ladder) Quints that carry approximately 500 gallons of water, firefighting equipment, and medical equipment.
- Squad Companies: Pumpers that carry 750 gallons of water, firefighting equipment, medical equipment, Dive Rescue, and Technical Rescue equipment.
- Rescue Companies: Medical Transport units that carry firefighting equipment and medical equipment.
- Tenders: Pumper Tankers that carry 3,000 gallons of water and firefighting equipment.
- Special Operations units: Heavy Rescues that carry Dive Rescue, Technical Rescue, and Hazmat response equipment.
- Brush trucks: Wildland Pumpers that carry up to 750 gallons of water and firefighting equipment.
- Dragons: ARFF Pumpers that carry foam and 3,000 gallons of water and firefighting equipment.

=== Special Operations ===
The department has two Special Operations apparatus located at stations 19 and 34. These multipurpose units function as Heavy Rescues, Hazmat units, and Mobile Command Centers on extended operations. Members of Special Operations are responsible for responding to Hazardous Materials (Hazmat), Dive Rescue, and Technical Rescue calls, and they assist the Sheriff's Office's Explosive Ordnance Disposal Team. Being certified Florida Urban Search & Rescue (FLUSAR) Rescue Specialists, they are trained to the technician level in Confined Space Rescue, High Angle Rescue,Trench Rescue, Structural Collapse Rescue, and Vehicle Machinery Rescue (VMR). Each Special Operations station houses a Squad, a Rescue, and a Heavy Rescue. Station 34, which is the headquarters for Battalion 9, also houses the Special Operations Battalion Chief, the Special Operations EMS Captain, and the Heavy Rescue Equipment vehicle, TRT 34.

=== Aerial Operations ===
All Ladder and Truck companies are Quints that incorporate ladder capabilities along with pumper functions. These aerials carry Rope Rescue equipment, a large complement of saws, vehicle stabilization equipment, air lift bags, and assorted pneumatic and electrical tools that are not carried by Engine companies. All personnel assigned full-time to aerial stations are certified at a minimum in Rope Rescue operations and Aerial operations, while the majority of personnel are certified Florida Urban Search & Rescue (FLUSAR) Rescue Specialists. Personnel assigned full-time to station 57 (Boca Raton) and station 73 (Belle Glade) are also certified Rescue Divers. Aside from Special Operations, these are the only 2 stations in the department with regional Dive Rescue teams.

=== Airport Operations ===
The PBCFR is responsible for providing aircraft rescue and firefighting for President Donald J. Trump International Airport, formerly but no longer one of the 50 busiest airports in the United States. The station, which is located near the center of the airport grounds, is home to 13 pieces of specialized firefighting equipment.

These apparatuses include:

- An air stair which allows for assistance in deplaning in an emergency.
- Four Airport crash tenders that go by the call sign Dragon (Dragon 1, Dragon 2, etc.).
- A foam unit that carries Purple-K concentrate to assist with extinguishing a fire.
- A heavy rescue vehicle that carries additional tools for a plane crash and other mass-casualty incidents.

=== Trauma Hawk ===
The Palm Beach County Fire Rescue partners with the Palm Beach County Health Care District to operate the Trauma Hawk Aero-Medical Program. The Trauma Hawk program, established in November 1990, replaced the use of Palm Beach County Sheriff's Office helicopters to medevac critically injured patients to area hospitals. At the Trauma Hawk Station, located at the south-west corner of [President Donald J. Trump International Airport[#Fire protection and emergency medical services|President Donald J. Trump International Airport]], the department has two Sikorsky S-76C helicopters. The air ambulances are identically equipped and can carry two patients each and up to four medical attendants if needed. Each helicopter is staffed with a pilot, a registered nurse (RN) and a paramedic. The nurses and paramedics are Palm Beach County Fire Rescue employees, while the pilots are Health Care District employees. In 2023, the first of two Leonardo AW169 helicopters was delivered, intended to replace the existing S-76C's, which will remain in service throughout the transition as flight teams and mechanics undergo specialized training.

== Support Services ==
=== Training & Safety Division ===
The Training & Safety Division is responsible for the training and education of Recruit Firefighters, existing Firefighters, and support personnel. Areas of training include:

- Recruit Academy: All newly hired firefighters attend a recruit academy, consisting of fire and EMS training, before working in the field.
- Company/Fire Officer Training: Officer Development Academies (ODAs) provide new Lieutenants, Captains, and Chief Officers with essential job knowledge and skills to effectively operate in their new supervisory positions.
- Driver Operator Training: Driver Candidate School (DCS) provides the fundamental knowledge and skills to operate pumping apparatus. Additional training classes to operate specialized apparatus are also offered.
- EMS Training: Annual EMT & Paramedic training covers basic and advanced medical skills (i.e. Airway Management, EKG Interpretation, Medication Administration) and Regional Protocol reviews.
- Fire Training: Annual firefighter training includes Live-Burn, Search, Safety & Survival, Fire Suppression, Forcible Entry, and Ventilation training.
- Specialty Training: Specialty units receive continuing training in Hazardous Materials (Hazmat), Dive Rescue, and Technical Rescue / USAR.

=== Dispatch ===
In the 1980s, Palm Beach County became the second in the nation to implement an enhanced 911 phone system, which provides critical information regarding the location of the caller to the 911 operator. The dispatch center, known as the Alarm Office, processes all incoming calls and operates multiple radio channels. In addition to a staff of over 40 communications personnel, trainers, and dispatch supervisors, a Fire Operations Officer (FOO) is assigned to the Alarm Office at all times. The purpose of the FOO is to provide technical assistance to dispatch during multi-company operations.

The department also provides dispatch services for 13 municipalities: Atlantis, Delray Beach, Greenacres, Gulf Stream, Highland Beach, Jupiter Inlet Colony, Mangonia Park, North Palm Beach, Palm Beach Gardens, Palm Beach Shores, Riviera Beach, Tequesta and West Palm Beach.

== Bureau of Fire, Arson, and Explosive Investigations ==
Working under the Office of the Fire Marshal, the fire/arson investigators are responsible for investigating the cause & origin of fire/explosion scenes, preserving scenes, and collecting evidence. The investigators respond to all areas that are serviced by Palm Beach County Fire Rescue, in addition to those areas serviced by the Palm Beach County Sheriff's Office. The investigators are sworn law enforcement officers, which gives them the ability to make arrests, carry firearms, and present cases to the State Attorney's office for prosecution of any bomb/fire/arson crimes. Investigators are also members of the Palm Beach County Bomb/Arson Task Force and are all professionally qualified to provide expert witness testimony in both criminal and civil cases.

== Stations and apparatus ==
| Fire Station Number | City | Engine Company or Squad Company | Tender Company, Ladder Company or Truck Company | EMS Rescue Unit | Other units | Battalion |
|---|---|---|---|---|---|---|
| 11 | Jupiter Inlet Colony | Engine 11 | | | | 1 |
| 14 | Jupiter Farms | Engine 14 | Tender 14 | Rescue 14 | Brush 14 | 1 |
| 15 | Juno Beach | | Ladder 15 | Rescue 15 | Brush 15 | 1 |
| 16 | Jupiter | Engine 16 | | Rescue 16 | Brush 16 | 1 |
| 17 | West Palm Beach | Engine 17 | | Rescue 17 | Brush 17 | 1 |
| 18 | Jupiter | Engine 18 | | Rescue 18 | Ski 18, Ski 218 | 1 |
| 19 | Jupiter | Squad 19 | | Rescue 19 | District Chief 19, Battalion Chief 19, EMS 19, Special Operations 19, Brush 19 | 1 |
| 20 | Wellington | Engine 20 | | Rescue 20 | Brush 20 | 2 |
| 21 | Loxahatchee Groves | Engine 21 | | Rescue 21 | Brush 21 | 2 |
| 22 | Westlake | Engine 22 | Tender 22 | Rescue 22 | Brush 22, High Water 22 | 2 |
| 23 | West Palm Beach | Engine 23 | | Rescue 23 Rescue 223 | District Chief 23, Battalion Chief 23, EMS 23 | 10 |
| 24 | West Palm Beach | Engine 24 | | Rescue 24 | | 10 |
| 25 | Wellington | Engine 25 | | Rescue 25 | Brush 625 | 2 |
| 26 | West Palm Beach | Engine 26 | | Rescue 26 | Brush 26 | 2 |
| 27 | Wellington | Engine 27 | | Rescue 27 | Brush 27 | 2 |
| 28 | Royal Palm Beach | Engine 28 | | Rescue 28 | District Chief 28, Battalion Chief 28, EMS 28, Brush 28 | 2 |
| 29 | Royal Palm Beach | | Truck 29 | Rescue 29 | | 2 |
| 30 | Wellington | Engine 30 | | Rescue 30 | | 2 |
| 31 | Lake Worth | Engine 31 | | Rescue 31 | | 3 |
| 32 | Lake Worth | Engine 32 | | Rescue 32 | Brush 32 | 10 |
| 33 | West Palm Beach | Engine 33 | | Rescue 33, Rescue 233 | | 10 |
| 34 | West Palm Beach | Squad 34 | | Rescue 34 | District Chief 34, Battalion Chief 34, EMS 34, Special Operations 34, TRT 34 | 9 |
| 35 | Lantana | | Truck 35 | Rescue 35 | | 3 |
| 36 | West Palm Beach | Engine 36 | | Rescue 36 | | 10 |
| 37 | Lantana | Engine 37 | | Rescue 37 | Ski 37, Ski 237 | 3 |
| 38 | Manalapan | Engine 38 | | | | 3 |
| 39 | Palm Springs | Engine 39 | | Rescue 39 | | 10 |
| 40 | Boynton Beach | Engine 40 | | Rescue 40 | | 4 |
| 41 | Boynton Beach | Engine 41 | | Rescue 41 Rescue 241 | | 4 |
| 42 | Delray Beach | Engine 42 | Tender 42 | Rescue 42 | District Chief 42, Battalion Chief 42, EMS 42, Brush 42, Light & Air 42, PSV 42 (High water response), Flood response trailer, Marine 970 | 4 |
| 43 | Lake Worth | Engine 43 | | Rescue 43 | Brush 643 | 3 |
| 44 | Boynton Beach | Engine 44 | | Rescue 44 | | 4 |
| 45 | Delray Beach | Engine 45 | | Rescue 45 Rescue 245 | | 4 |
| 46 | Boynton Beach | Engine 46 | | Rescue 46 | | 4 |
| 47 | Boynton Beach | | Ladder 47 | Rescue 47 | | 4 |
| 48 | Lake Worth | Engine 48 | | Rescue 48 | Brush 48, Battalion Chief 48, EMS 48 | 4 |
| 49 | Boynton Beach | | | Rescue 49 | | 4 |
| 51 | Boca Raton | Engine 51 | | Rescue 51 | | 5 |
| 52 | Boca Raton | Engine 52 | | Rescue 52 | | 4 |
| 53 | Boca Raton | Engine 53 | | Rescue 53 | | 5 |
| 54 | Boca Raton | Engine 54 | | Rescue 54 | Brush 654 | 5 |
| 55 | Boca Raton | Engine 55 | | Rescue 55 | | 5 |
| 56 | Boca Raton | Engine 56 | | Rescue 56 | | 5 |
| 57 | Boca Raton | | Ladder 57 | Rescue 57 | District Chief 57, Battalion Chief 57, EMS 57 | 5 |
| 58 | Boca Raton | Engine 58 | | Rescue 58 | | 5 |
| 68 | Lake Park | Engine 68 | | Rescue 68 | | 1 |
| 72 | Pahokee | Engine 72 | Tender 72 | Rescue 72 | Brush 72 | 7 |
| 73 | Belle Glade | Engine 73 | Ladder 73 | Rescue 73 Rescue 273 | District Chief 73, Battalion Chief 73, EMS 73, Airboat 73 | 7 |
| 74 | South Bay | Engine 74 | | Rescue 74 | Brush 74, Airboat 273 | 7 |
| 81 | Palm Beach International Airport | | | RP 81 | Airport Captain 81, Air Stairs 81, Dragon 1, 3, 4, & 5, Escort 81, Support 81 | 9 |
| 91 | Lake Worth Beach | Engine 91 | | Rescue 91, Rescue 291 | District Chief 91, Battalion Chief 91, EMS 91 | 3 |
| 93 | Lake Worth Beach | Engine 93 | | Rescue 93 | | 3 |
| Trauma Hawk | Palm Beach International Airport | | | | (2) Leonardo AW169, (1) S-76C Trauma Hawks | 9 |

== Gallery ==
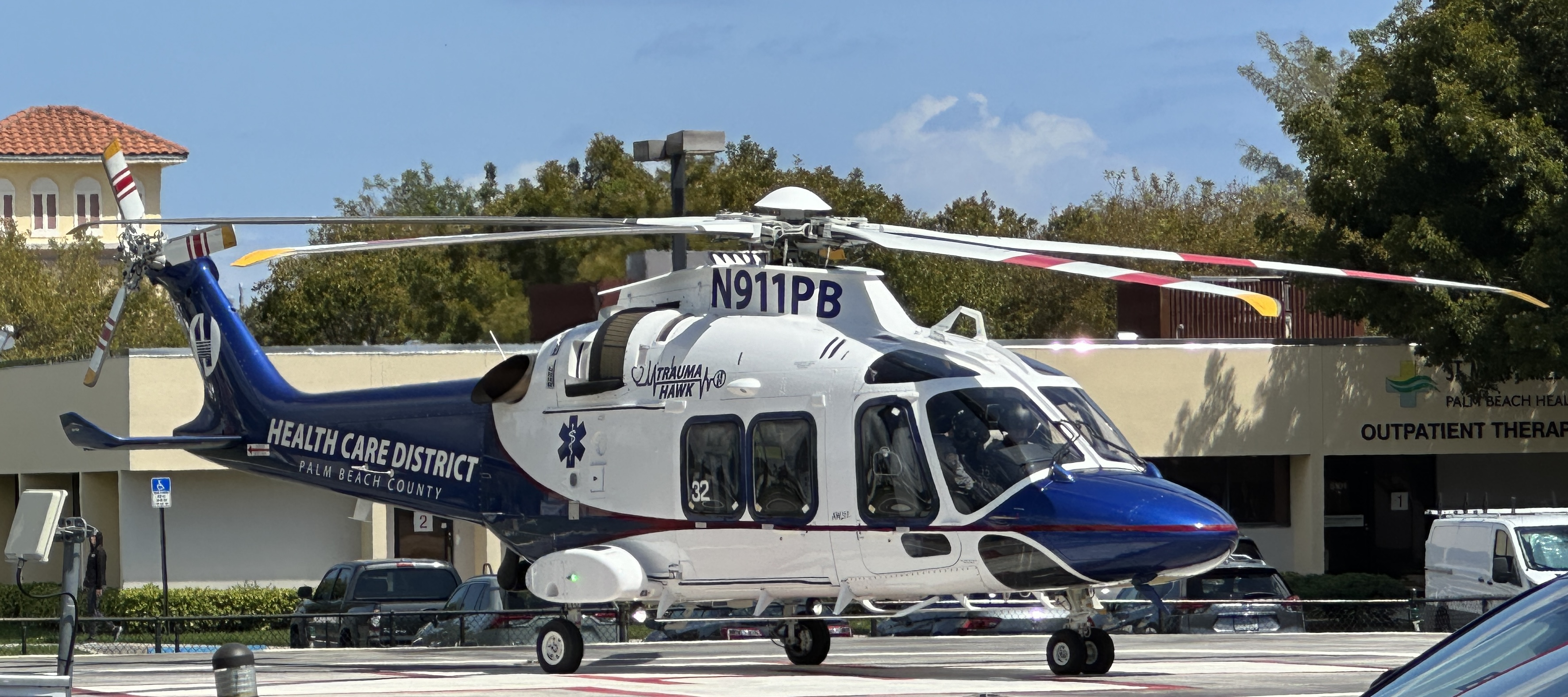
Leonardo AW169 N911PB Trauma Hawk at St Mary's Trauma Center

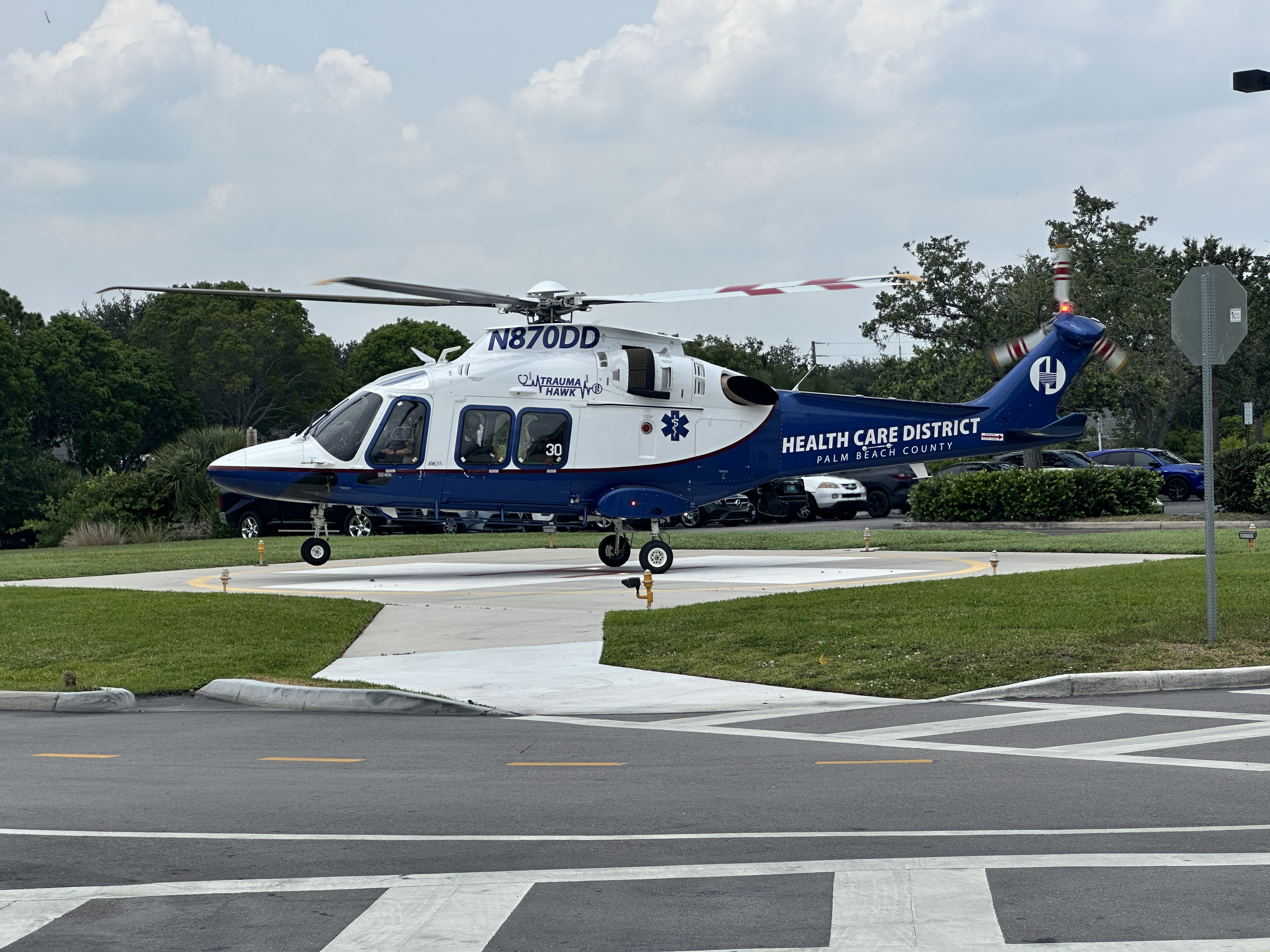
Leonardo AW169 N870DD Trauma Hawk at Jupiter Medical Center

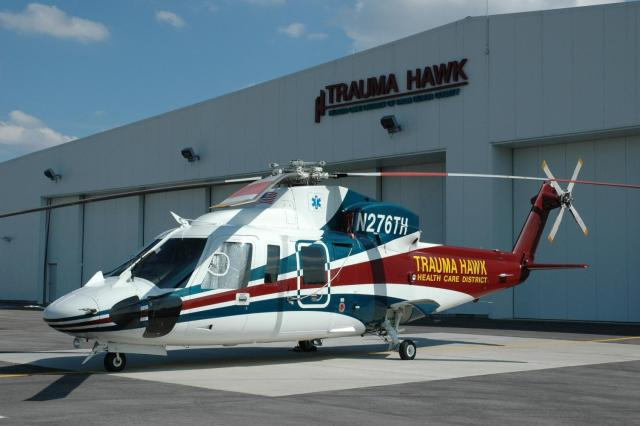
Sikorsky S-76C N276TH Trauma Hawk at its hangar at Palm Beach International Airport

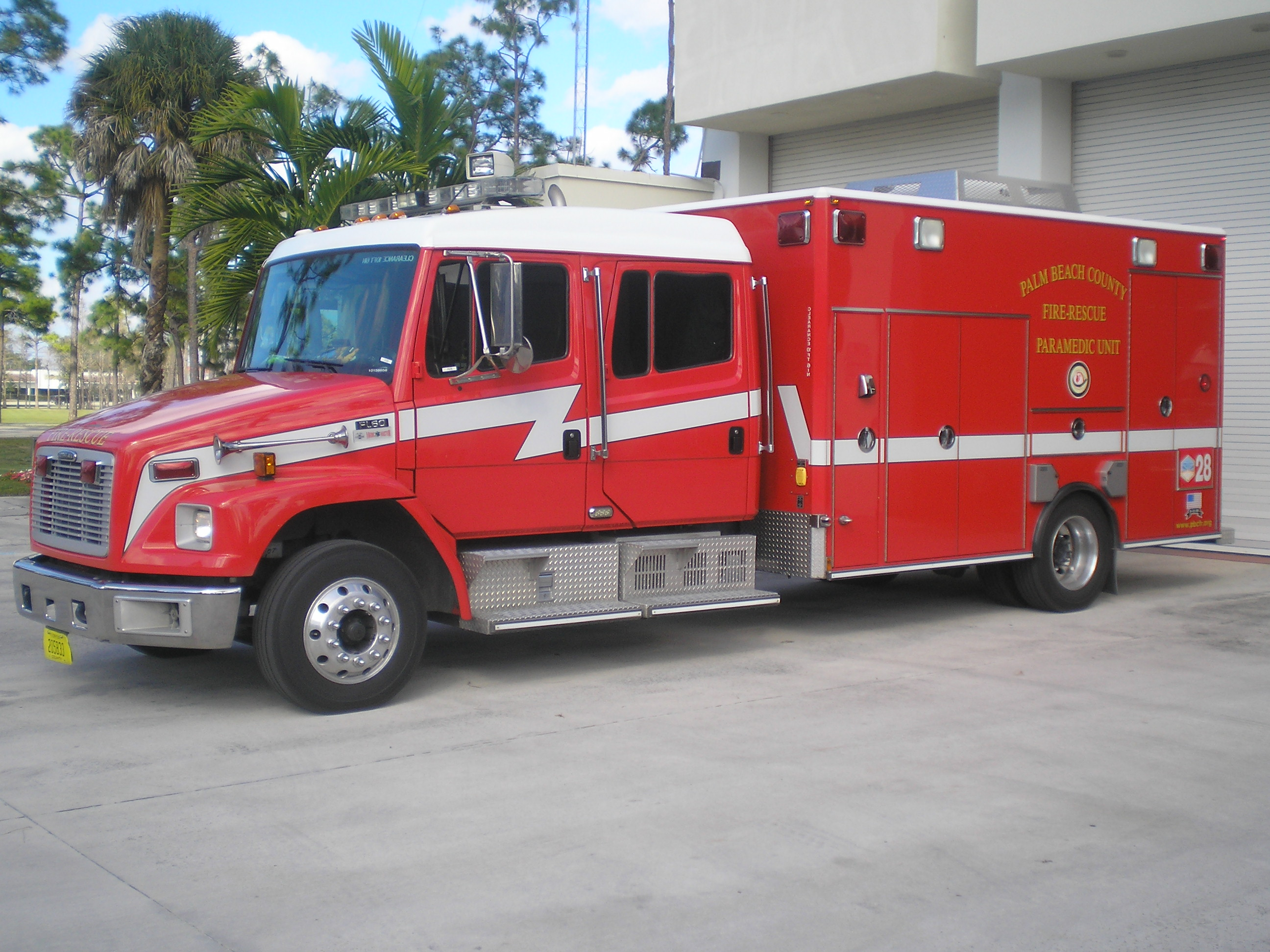
Spare 2004 Freightliner/American LaFrance

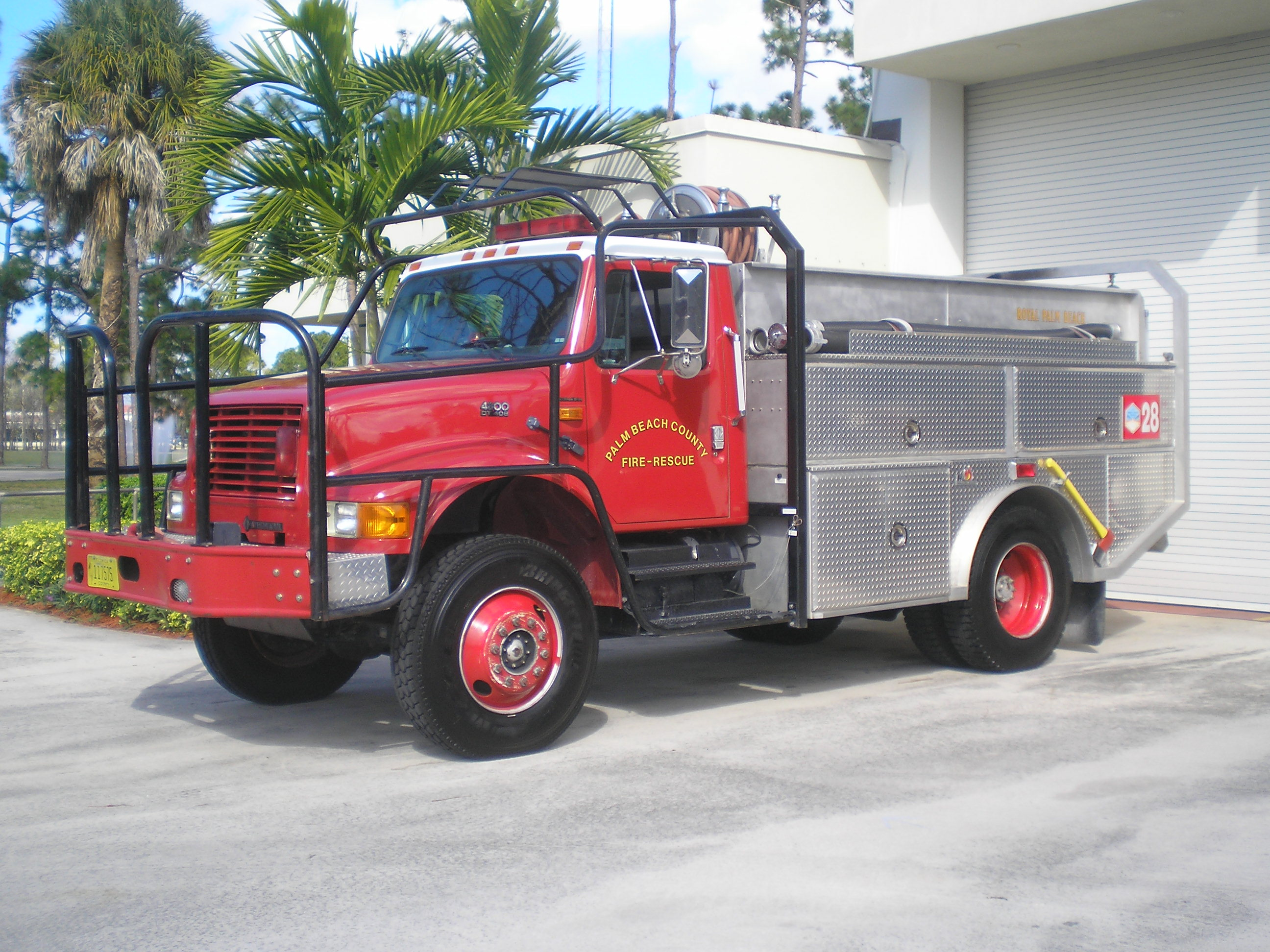
Brush 28, an off-road vehicle for clearing roads after hurricanes, drafting, and fighting brush and wildfires.

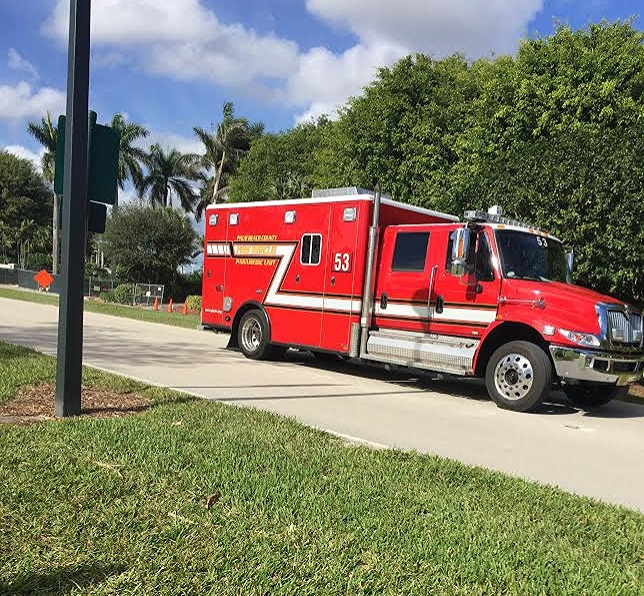
Rescue 53

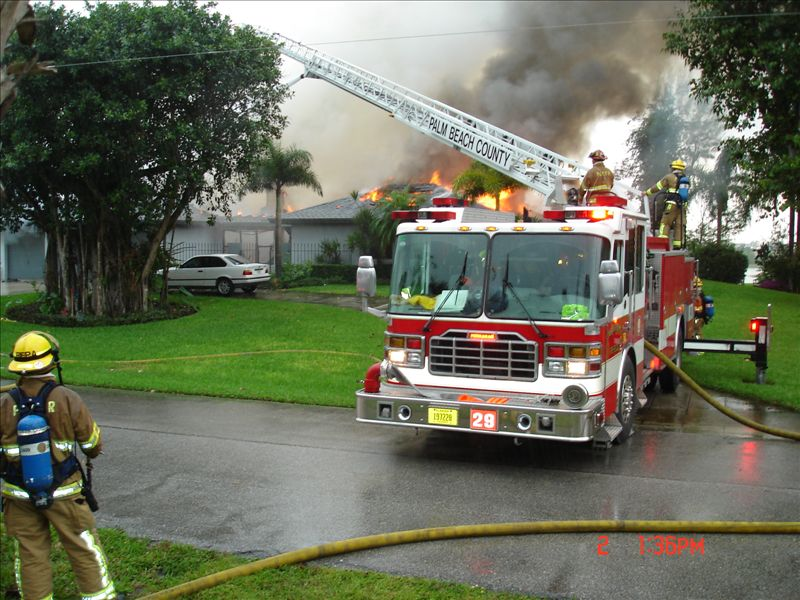
Old Truck 29 extinguishing a house fire

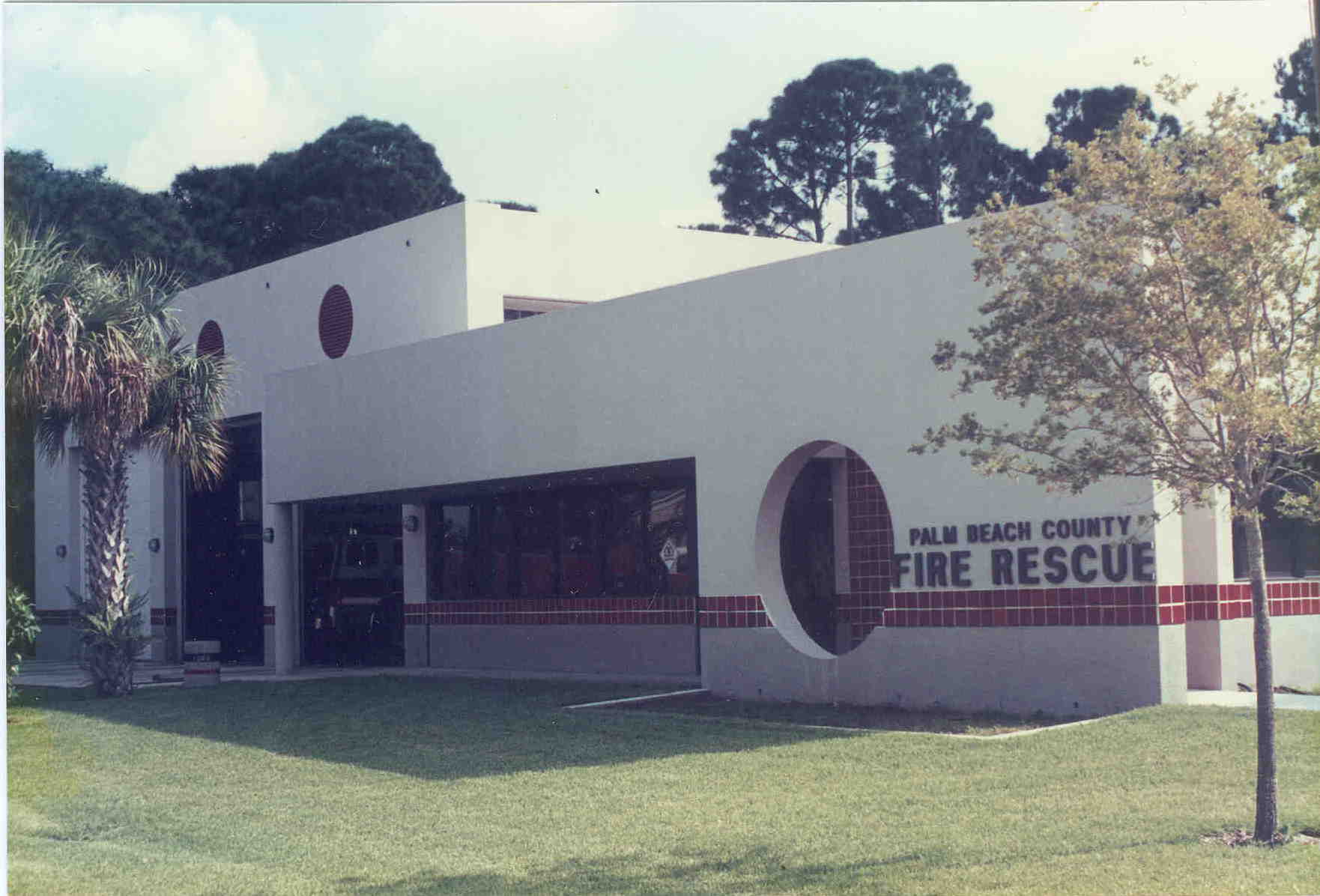
Station 33, serving West Palm Beach

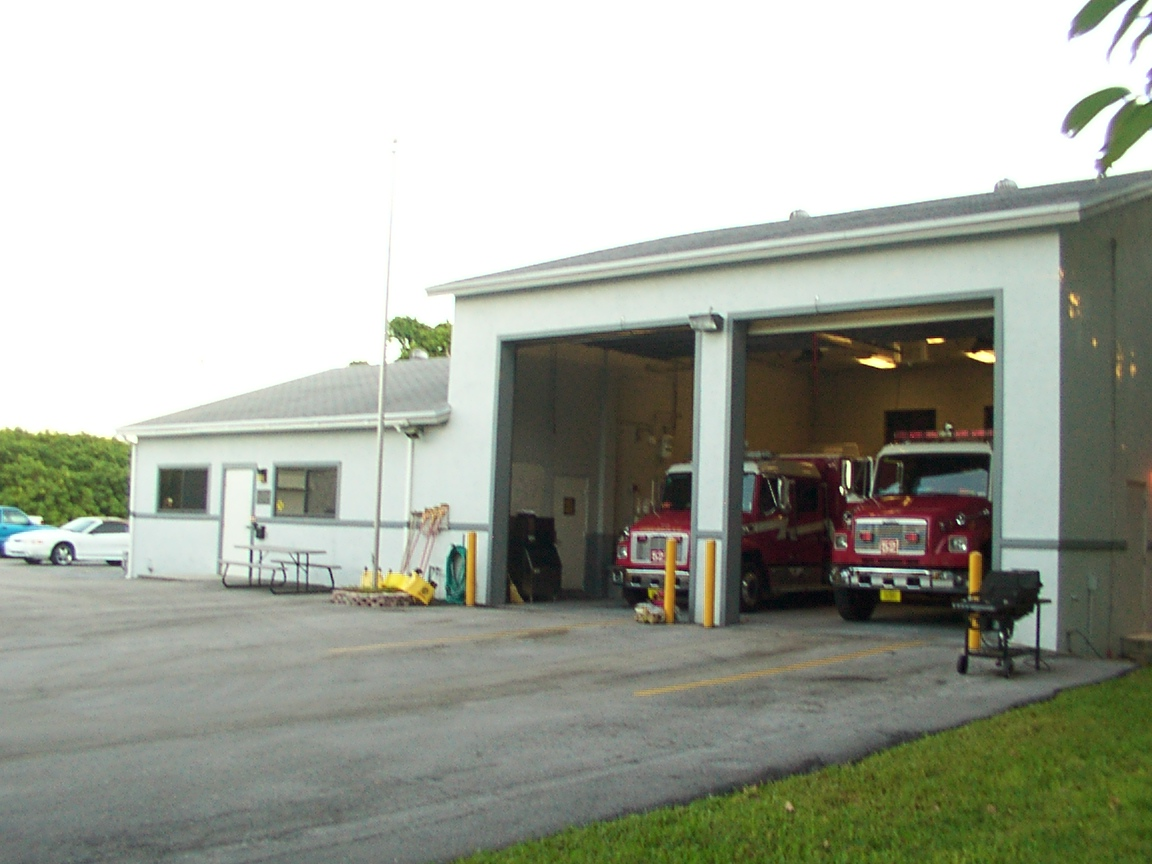
Station 52, serving Boca Raton

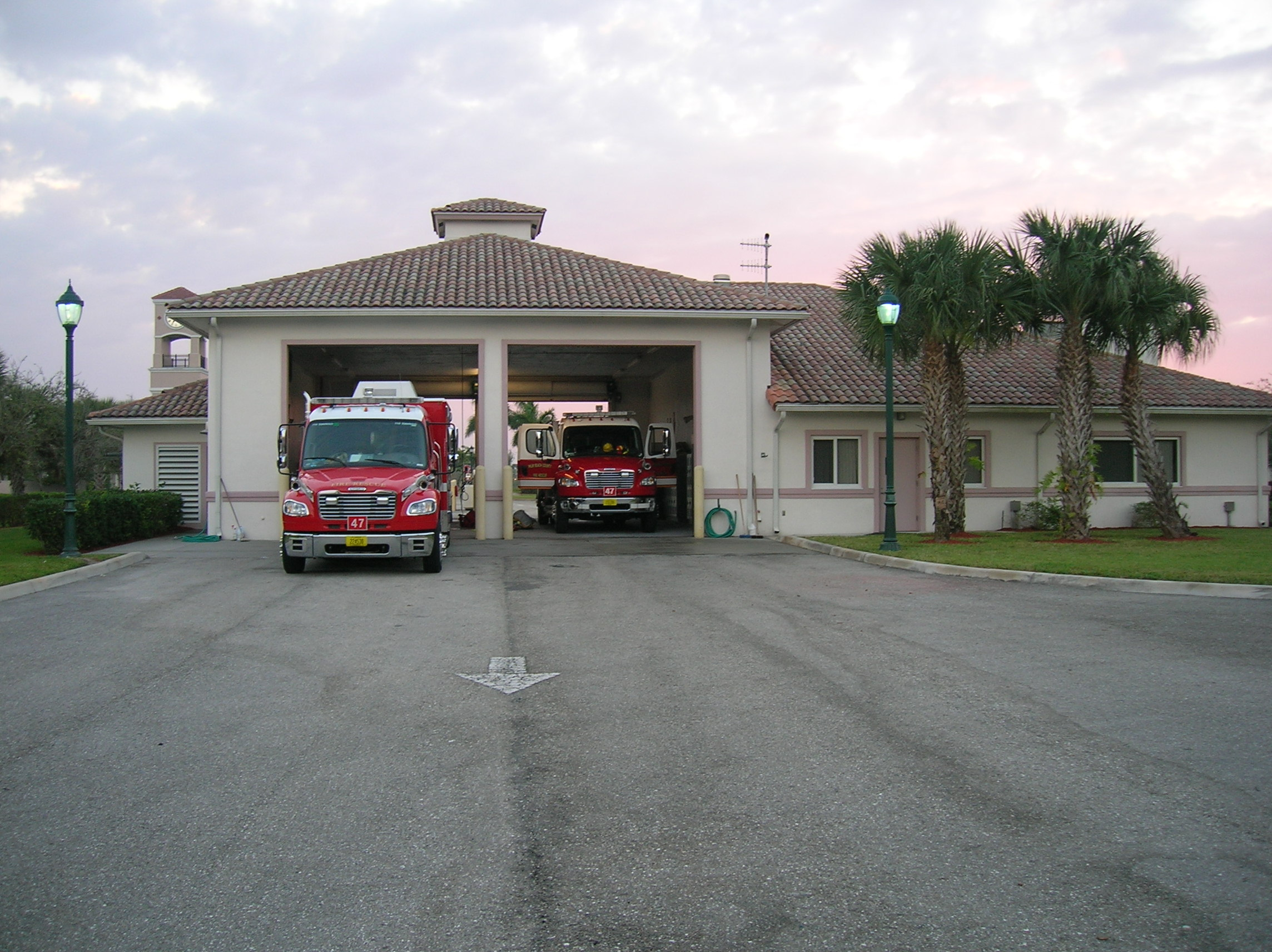
Station 47, serving Boynton Beach
