= Grace Morrison =

Aviator from Florida

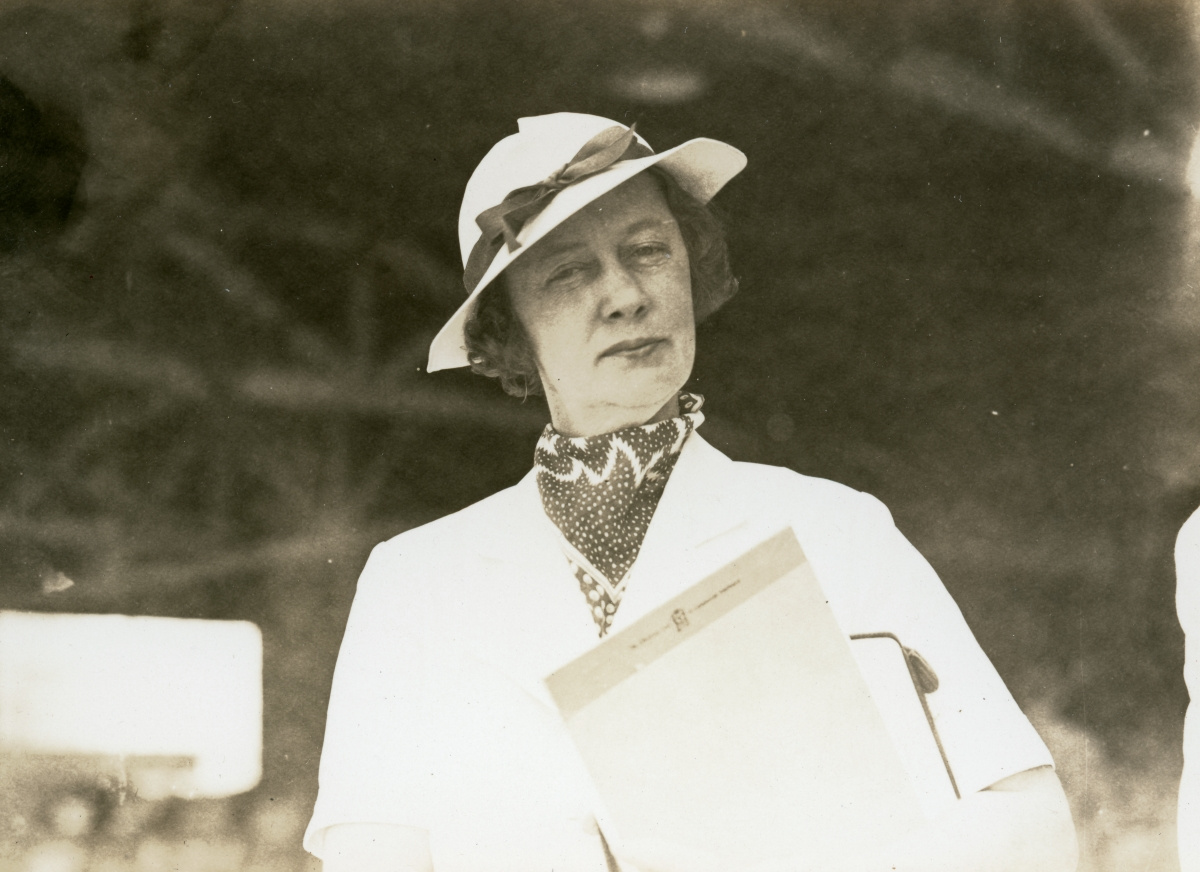
- Born: Charlotte, North Carolina
- Died: September 5, 1936; Titusville, Florida
- Occupations: aviator, secretary

Grace Morrison (1896 - September 5, 1936) was an American activist secretary and aviator.

Morrison was the person for whom her namesake Morrison Field was named, which later expanded into Palm Beach International Airport. Morrison had led the movement to construct the air field. It was named for her before the US Army Air Corps took over it.

Morrison learned to fly in 1932 and was the first female pilot to solo in Palm Beach County, Florida. She was president of the Palm Beach County Airport Association, leading the drive to expand and improve the small airfield.

In 1936, Morrison died in a car crash, months before the field's dedication.
