= President Donald J. Trump International Airport =

Airport in West Palm Beach, Florida, US

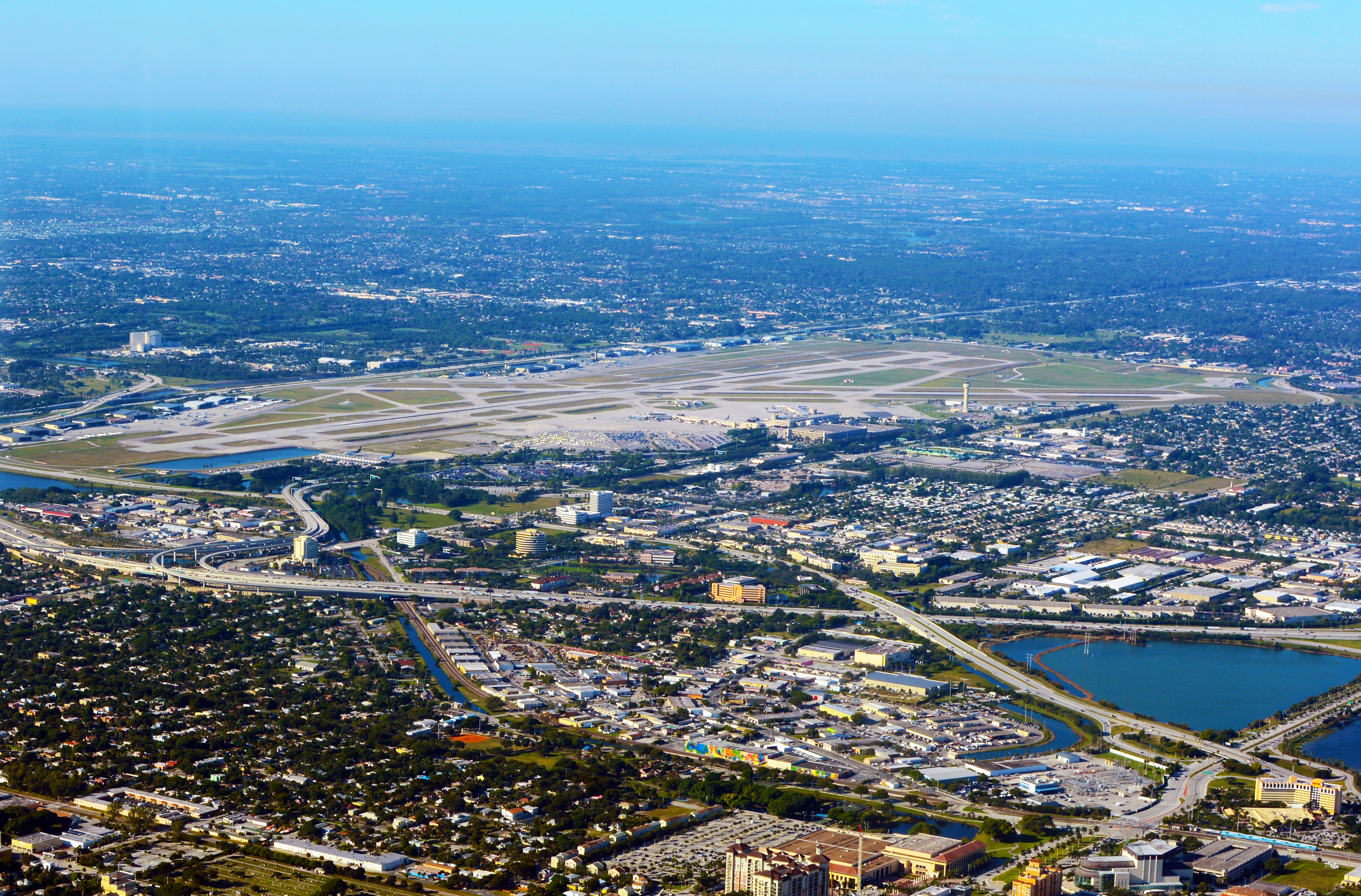
- The airport, as seen from the air in 2014
- IATA: DJT; ICAO: KDJT; FAA LID: DJT; WMO: 72203

Summary
- Airport type: Public
- Owner/Operator: Palm Beach County Department of Airports
- Serves: Miami metropolitan area
- Location: Unincorporated Palm Beach County, adjacent to West Palm Beach
- Opened: December 19, 1936; 89 years ago
- Elevation AMSL: 19 ft (5.8 m)
- Coordinates: 26°40′59″N 80°05′44″W
- Website: flydjt.org

Maps
- FAA airport diagram
- Interactive map of President Donald J. Trump International Airport

Runways
Direction	Length		Surface
Direction	ft	m	Surface
10L/28R	10,001	3,048	Asphalt
10R/28L	3,214	980	Asphalt
14/32	6,931	2,113	Asphalt

Statistics (2025)
- Aircraft operations: 159,091
- Passengers: 8,657,372 ▲3.0%
- Source: Federal Aviation Administration; www.pbia.org

President Donald J. Trump International Airport (IATA: DJT, ICAO: KDJT, FAA LID: DJT), (Note: Formerly (IATA: PBI, ICAO: KPBI, FAA LID: PBI)) formerly known as Palm Beach International Airport, (Note: Also known as PBI Airport; historically as Morrison Field and Palm Beach Air Force Base.) is a public airport in Palm Beach County, Florida, United States. It is located just west of the city of West Palm Beach, for which it serves as the primary airport. It is also the primary airport for most of Palm Beach County, serving the suburbs and cities of Boca Raton, Wellington, Boynton Beach, Jupiter, and Palm Beach Gardens. It is the third-busiest airport in the Miami metropolitan area, after Miami International Airport and Fort Lauderdale–Hollywood International Airport.

The airport is operated by the Palm Beach County Department of Airports. Road access to the airport is direct from I-95, Southern Boulevard, and Congress Avenue. The airport is bordered on the west by Military Trail.

In February 2026, the Florida Legislature approved a bill to rename the airport to the "President Donald J. Trump International Airport" after the 45th and 47th president Donald Trump. The bill was signed into law by Florida governor Ron DeSantis the following month. The renaming took effect on July 9, 2026. The IATA code was officially changed from PBI to DJT on August 18, 2026. It is the first time a United States airport has been named after a sitting president.

== History ==
=== Early history, 1936–1959 ===
==== Original construction and World War II ====
The airport began operations in 1936 as Morrison Field. It was named in honor of Grace Morrison, a key participant in the planning and organization of the airfield. The first flight departing the field was a New York-bound DC-2 operated by Eastern Air Lines in 1936. The airport was officially dedicated on December 19, 1936.

In 1937, the airport expanded beyond an airstrip and an administration building when the Palm Beach Aero Corporation obtained a lease, built hangars and the first terminal on the south side of the airport. The new terminal was known as the Eastern Air Lines Terminal.

The field was used by the U.S. Army Air Forces during World War II. Following the attack on Pearl Harbor, Morrison Field was used for training and later as a staging base for the Allied invasion of France, with numerous aircraft departing Morrison en route to the United Kingdom to take part in the D-Day invasion of Normandy. Morrison Field was a stopover for flights to and from India, via Brazil and West Africa.

==== Post-war era ====
In 1947, the newly established U.S. Air Force returned ownership of Morrison Field to Palm Beach County. The name was then changed to Palm Beach International Airport one year later, in 1948.

The airport was again used by the U.S. Air Force in 1951 and renamed Palm Beach Air Force Base under the control of the Military Air Transport Service (MATS). USAF operations occupied the north half of the airfield while civil operations and the airline terminal used the south half. MATS used the base for training with the host unit being the 1707th Air Transport Wing (Heavy), and its 1740th Heavy Transport Training Unit. The 1707 ATW was known as the "University of MATS", becoming the primary USAF training unit for all Air Force personnel supporting and flying heavy transport aircraft. These included C-124 Globemaster II, C-118 Liftmaster, C-97 Stratofreighter, and C-54 Skymaster maintenance training along with aircrew and transition pilot training. Nearly 23,000 airmen trained at Palm Beach AFB during the Korean War.

The Air Weather Service used Palm Beach AFB as headquarters for hurricane research, flying the first WB-50D Superfortress "Hurricane Hunter" aircraft from the base in 1956.

After several years of Palm Beach County fighting the Air Force presence in West Palm Beach, the Air Force started to close down operations there. The 1707 ATW was inactivated on June 30, 1959, and reassigned to Tinker AFB, Oklahoma. With the wing's departure, Palm Beach County took over airfield operations. The Air Force retained a small presence at the base with the 9th Weather Group becoming the main operational unit at Palm Beach AFB, performing hurricane and weather research for the Air Weather Service. The Air Photographic and Charting Service (APCS) moved its 1370th Photo-Mapping Wing to the base, performing geodetic survey flights. The Air Force finally closed Palm Beach AFB in 1962, and all property was conveyed to Palm Beach International Airport the same year.

=== Commercial service era, 1959–present ===
Delta Air Lines began scheduled flights in 1959 and Capital Airlines in 1960. The first turbine-powered flights were Eastern Airlines Lockheed L-188 Electras in 1959, and Eastern DC-8 nonstops to Idlewild started in December 1960.

Air Force One was a frequent visitor to PBI during John F. Kennedy's presidency in the early 1960s. Local voters defeated a proposal to relocate the airport around this time, instead choosing to expand the existing facilities. In October 1966, an eight-gate Main Terminal opened on the northeast side of the airport; in 1974 Delta Air Lines moved into its own six-gate terminal with the airport's first jetways. The Federal Aviation Administration (FAA) built a new air traffic control tower on the south side of the airport during this period.

By the mid-1970s, the airport's dominant carriers were Delta, Eastern and National. Eastern operated the airport's only widebody service at the time, daily L-1011s to New York JFK and Newark. By 1979, National operated daily DC-10 service to JFK, LaGuardia and Miami, while Eastern operated L-1011s to Atlanta and Delta operated L-1011s to Tampa. By 1985, eight widebodies a day flew between PBI and the three New York airports.

The 25-gate David McCampbell Terminal, named for a World War II naval flying ace, was dedicated in 1988. In 2003, a new landscaped I-95 interchange was built to decrease traffic on Southern Boulevard (US 98) extending Turnage Boulevard (the road around the perimeter of the concourse).

Competition from rapidly expanding Fort Lauderdale-Hollywood International Airport cut growth at the airport in the 1990s.

==== 21st century ====
Palm Beach International Airport logo before 2026

The 2001 recession and the September 11 terrorist attacks further inhibited growth, but development in South Florida since 2002 has finally led to a surge of passenger traffic at the airport. In addition, discount carriers such as JetBlue and Southwest Airlines began service to PBI. In 2006, the county embarked on an interim expansion program by breaking ground on a 7-story parking garage and the addition of 3 gates in Concourse C. Long range expansions include gates at Concourse B and the eventual construction of a new 14 gate Concourse D to be extended east from the present terminal.

Donald Trump sued to block the expansion of one of the runways at PBI in 2010. In 2015, he initiated a $100 million lawsuit over the flight path that passes over his Mar-a-Lago estate. After his win in the 2016 presidential election ensured some type of no fly zone over his property, he dropped the lawsuit. However, plans to expand the airport to meet growing demand are still in the works as of 2026.

During Trump's first and second presidential term, Air Force One again became a frequent visitor to PBI, typically parking on the south side of the airport near Southern Boulevard. Until 2017, a line of school buses was used as a temporary barrier between the aircraft and onlookers. Temporary security fences began being used requiring assembly and disassembling.

==== Renaming after Donald Trump, 2026 ====
Entrance sign for President Donald J. Trump International Airport

In February 2026, lawmakers in the Florida legislature approved a bill to rename the airport to "President Donald J. Trump International Airport" by a vote of 25 to 11 in the Florida Senate and 81 to 30 in the Florida House of Representatives. Florida governor Ron DeSantis signed the bill into law in March 2026, though the Federal Aviation Administration needed to update its charts and databases for the change of name to take full effect. The Trump Organization filed to trademark the airport's new name. This marked the first time a United States airport has been named after an incumbent president. The renaming took effect on July 9, 2026. Trump Force One, a Boeing 757 owned by the Trump Organization, was the first plane to land after the renaming.

== Facilities ==
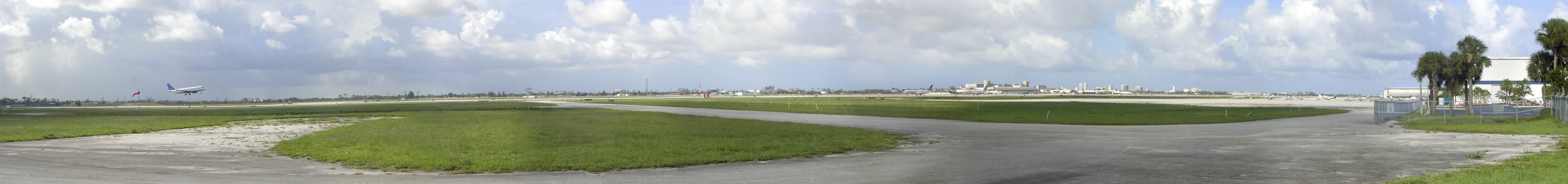
2006 panorama of Palm Beach International Airport from what was the 391st Bomb Group Restaurant off of Southern Boulevard

=== Runways and taxiways ===
The airport covers 2,120 acres (858 ha) and has three runways:

- 10L/28R: 10,001 x 150 ft. (3,048 x 46 m), asphalt
- 10R/28L: 3,214 x 75 ft. (980 x 23 m), asphalt
- 14/32: 6,931 x 150 ft. (2,113 x 46 m), asphalt

The airport's runway designations were changed by the Federal Aviation Administration to their current configuration on December 17, 2009. Previously, they had been 09L/27R, 09R/27L, and 13/31.

=== Terminal ===
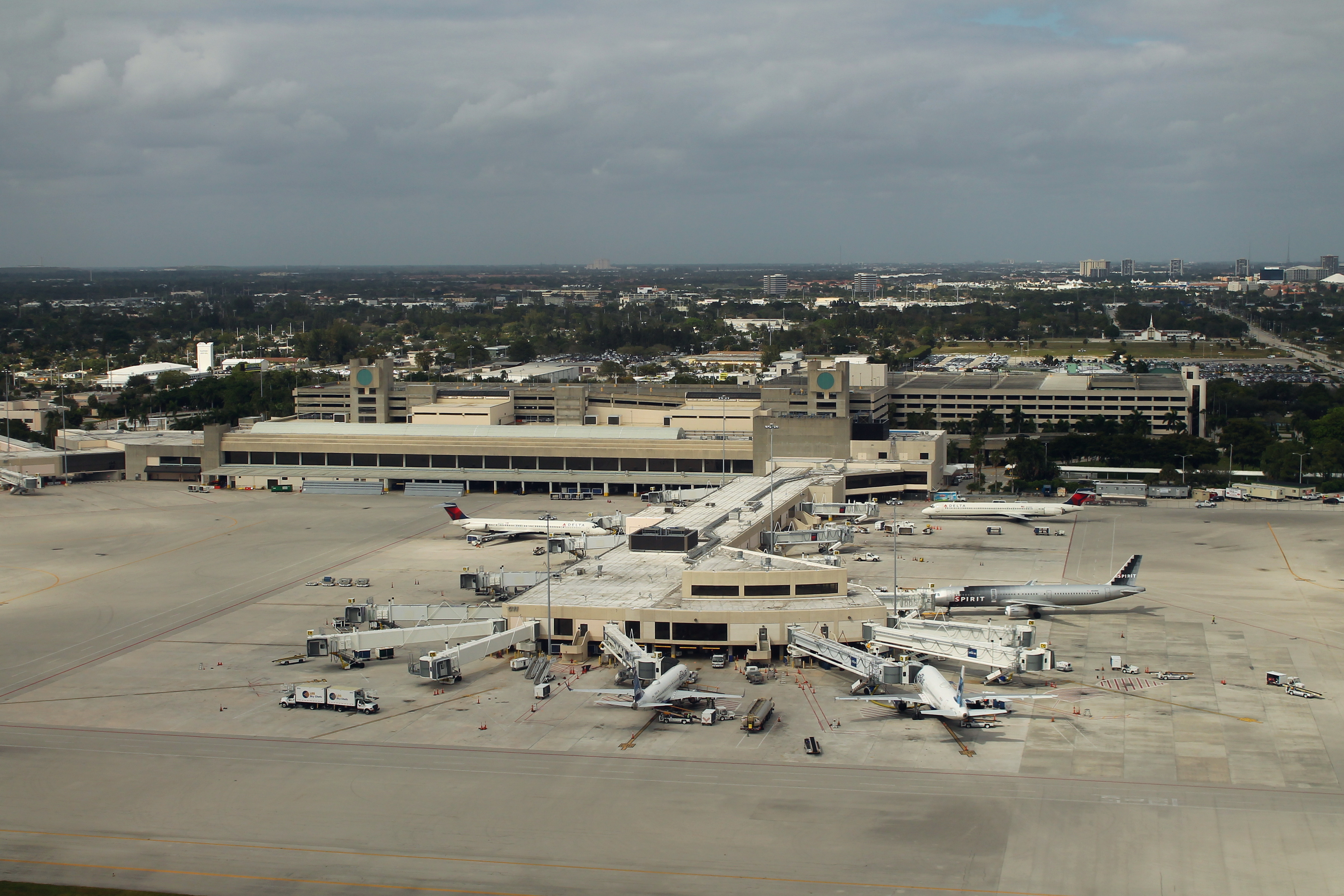
The airport's terminal in 2016, with Concourse C visible at center

Donald J. Trump International Airport has one terminal, which consists of 31 gates (27 jetway gates, 4 hardstands) and three concourses.

- Concourse A contains four gates (A1–A4), and serves Allegiant Air, Avelo Airlines, and Bahamasair.
- Concourse B contains 13 gates (B1–B12, B14), and serves American Airlines, Avelo Airlines, Southwest Airlines, Sun Country Airlines, and United Airlines.
- Concourse C contains 14 gates (C1–C12, C14, C16), and serves Air Canada, Breeze Airways, Delta Air Lines, Frontier Airlines, JetBlue, and Porter Airlines.

Customs and immigration services for international flights are located on the lower level on the west side of the terminal and can be accessed by gates on both Concourses A and B. A future Concourse D is proposed, to be constructed off the east side of the terminal.

=== Control tower ===
A 240-foot (73 m) Airport Traffic Control tower is active on the north side of the airport – west of concourse A, off Belvedere Road – along with a single-story, 9,000-square-foot (840 m^{2}) ATBM Base Building. The current tower replaced the previous one, which was located on the southern side of the airport. The old tower was eventually demolished after the new tower came into service.

=== Helicopters ===
- Helicopter operations typically use 10R/28L or its parallel taxiways or make a direct approach to either Customs or the Galaxy Aviation ramp.
- Palm Beach County Sheriffs Office (PBSO) maintains its air division from a hangar at the southwest corner of the airport.
- Health Care District of Palm Beach County operates the Traumahawk with Palm Beach County Fire-Rescue from a hangar at the southwest corner of the airport, next to PBSO.

=== Other hangars ===
- General Aviation fixed-base operators (FBO) and hangars are located along the southern edge of the airport, with entrance access available by the Jet Aviation FBO. Other FBOs at PBI include Atlantic Aviation and Signature Flight Support.

=== Fire protection and emergency medical services ===
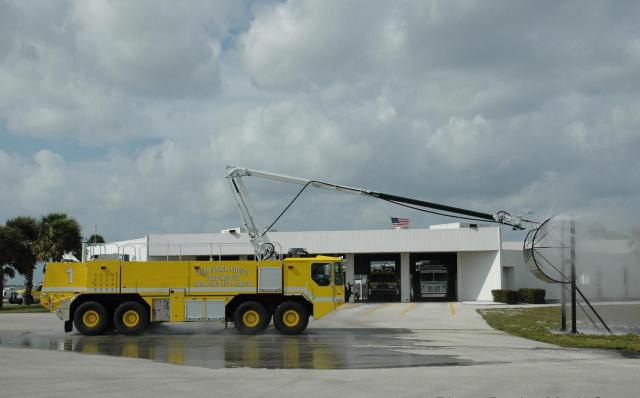
One of the airport's crash response trucks in 2008

The Palm Beach County Fire Rescue Aviation Battalion is located between the runways at PBI. The fire station, which is located near the center of the airport grounds, is home to 13 pieces of specialized fire fighting equipment.

These apparatus include:

- An air stair for emergency deplanings
- Five airport crash tenders, with call sign Dragon (Dragon 1, Dragon 2, etc.)
- A foam unit that carries Purple-K concentrate to assist with extinguishing a fire
- A heavy rescue vehicle that carries additional tools for plane crashes and other mass-casualty incidents

=== Trauma Hawk ===
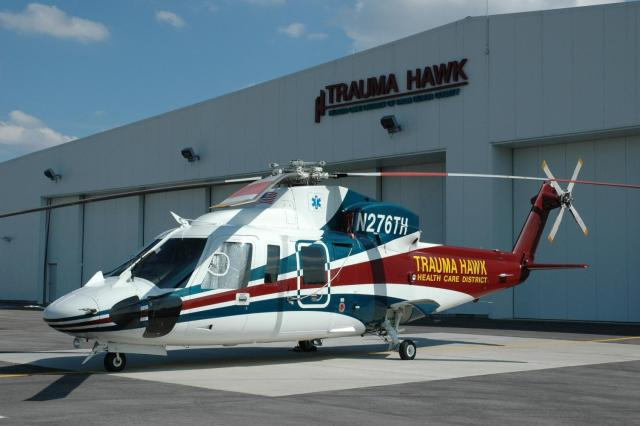
Trauma Hawk 1 at its hangar at Palm Beach International Airport in 2006

The Trauma Hawk Station, which is located at the south west corner of the airport, Palm Beach County Fire Rescue has two Sikorsky S-76C helicopters. The department partners with the Palm Beach County Health Care District to operate the Trauma Hawk Aero-Medical Program. The Trauma Hawk program, which was established in November 1990, replaced the use of Palm Beach County Sheriff's Office helicopters to medevac critically injured patients to area hospitals. Air ambulances are identically equipped and can carry two patients each and up to four medical attendants if needed. Each helicopter is staffed with a pilot, a registered nurse (RN) and a paramedic. The nurses and paramedics are Palm Beach County Fire Rescue employees while the pilots are Health Care District employees.

== Airlines and destinations ==
=== Passenger ===
Airlines	Destinations
Air Canada	Seasonal: Montréal–Trudeau, Toronto–Pearson
Allegiant Air	Asheville, Cincinnati, Grand Rapids, Pittsburgh
American Airlines	Charlotte, Chicago–O'Hare, Dallas/Fort Worth, Philadelphia, Washington–National; Seasonal: New York–LaGuardia
Avelo Airlines	Dallas/McKinney (begins December 17, 2026), New Haven; Seasonal: Wilmington (DE)
Bahamasair	Marsh Harbour
BladeOne	Seasonal charter: White Plains
Breeze Airways	Atlantic City (begins December 17, 2026), New Haven, Norfolk, Raleigh/Durham; Seasonal: Akron/Canton, Charleston (SC), Greenville/Spartanburg (begins December 18, 2026), Richmond
Delta Air Lines	Atlanta, Boston, Detroit, New York–JFK, New York–LaGuardia; Seasonal: Los Angeles, Minneapolis/St. Paul
Frontier Airlines	Atlanta, Cincinnati, Cleveland, Philadelphia; Seasonal: Long Island/Islip, Trenton
JetBlue	Boston, Hartford, Long Island/Islip, New York–JFK, New York–LaGuardia, Newark, Providence, Washington–National, White Plains; Seasonal: Los Angeles
JSX	White Plains; Charter: Teterboro
Porter Airlines	Seasonal: Toronto–Pearson
Southwest Airlines	Baltimore, Long Island/Islip, Nashville, Orlando; Seasonal: Buffalo, Indianapolis (begins February 13, 2027), Pittsburgh (resumes February 13, 2027), Providence, St. Louis
Sun Country Airlines	Seasonal: Minneapolis/St. Paul
United Airlines	Chicago–O'Hare, Newark, Houston–Intercontinental; Seasonal: Denver, San Francisco, Washington–Dulles

== Statistics ==
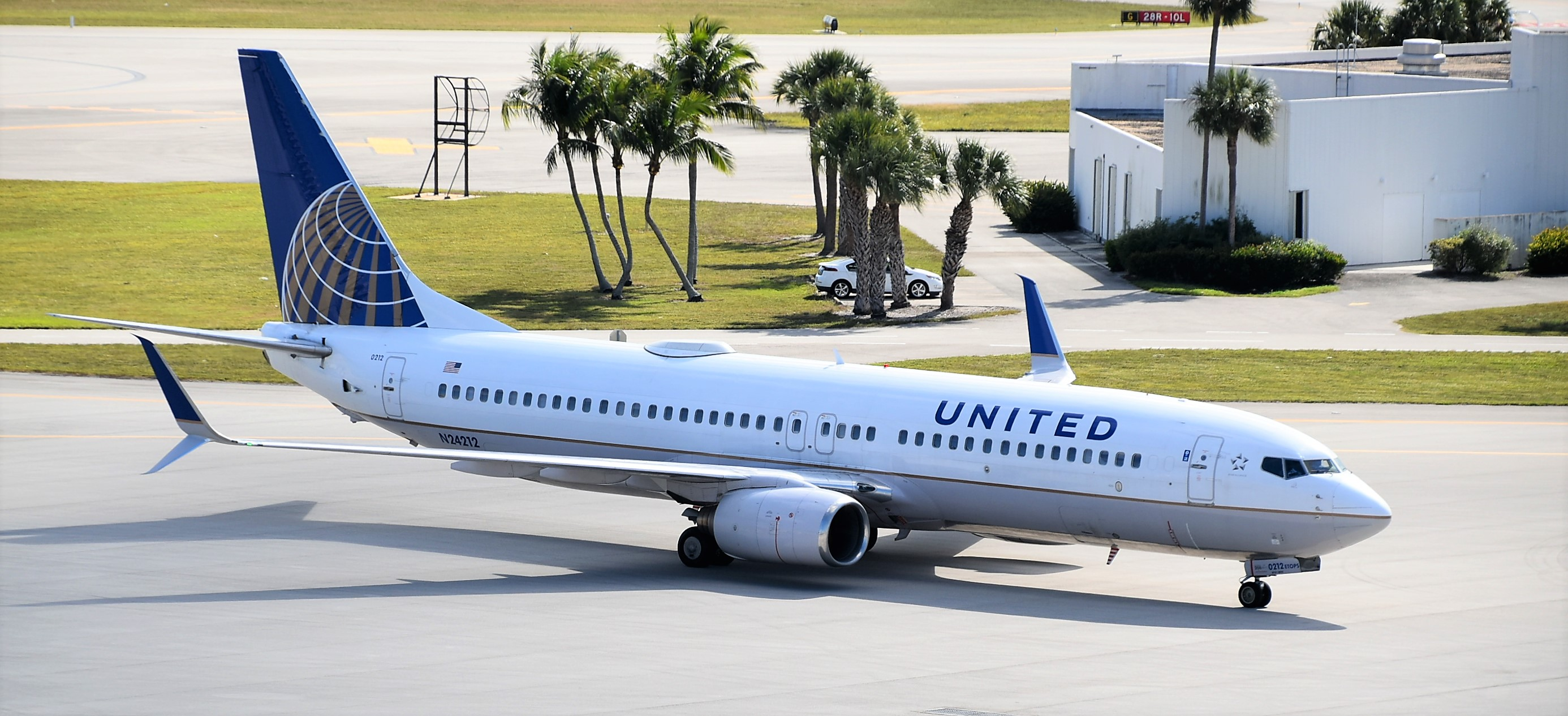
United Airlines Boeing 737 at DJT

=== Top destinations ===
Busiest domestic routes from DJT (September 2025 – August 2026)
Rank	City	Passengers	Carriers
1	Atlanta, Georgia	539,563	Delta, Frontier, Southwest
2	Newark, New Jersey	455,563	JetBlue, United
3	New York–LaGuardia, New York	395,679	Delta, JetBlue, Spirit
4	Boston, Massachusetts	256,239	American, Delta, JetBlue
5	Charlotte, North Carolina	236,293	American
6	New York–JFK, New York	235,629	Delta, JetBlue
7	Philadelphia, Pennsylvania	198,045	American, Frontier
8	White Plains, New York	186,838	Delta, JetBlue
9	Washington–National, D.C.	173,880	American, JetBlue
10	Chicago–O'Hare, Illinois	155,461	American, United

=== Airline market share ===
Carrier shares (September 2025 – August 2026)
1. JetBlue, 2,082,821 (26.1%)
2. Delta, 1,917,244 (24.0%)
3. American, 1,572,455 (19.7%)
4. United, 1,114,716 (14.0%)
5. Southwest, 603,311 (7.60%)
6. Other, 695,600 (8.70%)

Top airlines at DJT (September 2025 – August 2026)
Rank	Airline	Passengers	Percent of market share
1	JetBlue Airways	2,082,821	26.1%
2	Delta Air Lines	1,917,244	24.0%
3	American Airlines	1,572,455	19.7%
4	United Airlines	1,114,716	14.0%
5	Southwest Airlines	603,311	7.6%
-	Other	695,600	8.7%

=== Annual traffic ===
Annual passenger traffic (enplaned + deplaned), 1989–present
Year	Passengers	Year	Passengers	Year	Passengers	Year	Passengers
1989	5,115,700	1999	5,742,634	2009	5,994,606	2019	6,899,919
1990	5,691,410	2000	5,842,594	2010	5,887,723	2020	3,085,200
1991	5,077,573	2001	5,939,404	2011	5,769,583	2021	5,260,748
1992	5,023,693	2002	5,483,662	2012	5,609,168	2022	6,640,043
1993	5,074,132	2003	6,014,186	2013	5,691,747	2023	7,766,225
1994	5,588,434	2004	6,537,263	2014	5,886,384	2024	8,403,519
1995	5,418,831	2005	7,014,237	2015	6,265,530	2025	8,657,372
1996	5,680,913	2006	6,824,789	2016	6,264,397	2026	
1997	5,813,361	2007	6,936,449	2017	6,322,452	2027	
1998	5,899,482	2008	6,476,303	2018	6,513,943	2028	

== Ground transportation ==
=== Car ===
Interstate 95, Southern Boulevard, and Congress Avenue all serve – and provide direct vehicular access to – the airport.

=== Public transportation ===
==== Bus ====
Palm Tran bus routes 2 and 44 serve the airport. Both provide connections to the Amtrak/Tri-Rail West Palm Beach train station; the station is also served by Greyhound buses.

==== Rail ====
The airport is near the West Palm Beach Brightline Station (served by Brightline) and the West Palm Beach Amtrak/Tri-Rail station (served by Amtrak intercity trains and Tri-Rail commuter trains). A Palm Tran shuttle bus service connects the latter station with the airport.

== Accidents and incidents ==
- On August 21, 1956, a USAF Douglas C-124C Globemaster II crashed during its initial climb at then Palm Beach Air Force Base when a prop cuff came off an engine and went through the fuselage, cutting control cables, the aircraft banked to the right and crashed into a tree nursery; three out of the six occupants were killed.
- On November 11, 2010, a Piper PA-44 Seminole flying from Palm Beach International Airport to Melbourne Orlando International Airport crashed on a taxiway after an engine failed during takeoff. The plane was operated by Florida Institute of Technology's College of Aeronautics and all four aboard—two FIT flight students, a flight instructor, and a passenger—were killed.

== See also ==
- Florida World War II Army Airfields
- List of airports in Florida
- Transportation in South Florida
- List of things named after Donald Trump
