= Florida Black Heritage Trail =

Historic trail in Florida, US

The Florida Black Heritage Trail includes sites related to Florida's African American leaders and communities. It was the first trail to be included in the Florida Heritage Trails series.

== History ==
Between 1986 and 1988, archaeological work and a historical investigation by Kathleen Deagan of the Florida Museum of Natural History, and Jane Landers and John Marron, both of the University of Florida, led to the discovery of the second iteration of Fort Mose. Located in present-day St. Johns County near St. Augustine, the 1752 fort was situated near the town of Gracia Real de Santa Teresa de Mose. The town and fort both became the first legally sanctioned community for free Africa Americans in an area of the modern-day United States. Slaves fleeing the Southern United States for Spanish Florida were offered freedom if they converted to Catholicism and joined a militia to protect the colony from British attacks.

Inspired by the discovery of Fort Mose, the Florida Legislature voted to establish a commission to study the history of African Americans in Florida. According to Rusty Sevigny of the Florida Department of State's Division of Historical Resources, the study group received $14,000 and "was charged with four tasks: to study the establishment of a Black Heritage Trail, to explore ways to include black history in textbooks, to determine how African-American culture could be included in the quincentennial celebration, and generally to recommend methods of preserving black history in Florida." After the commission compiled a list of 141 sites relating to African American history in Florida, state representatives Bill Clark and Alzo Reddick sponsored legislation in 1991 to allocate $100,000 for the creation and publication of a guidebook.

== Sites ==
The following sites are listed on the Florida Black Heritage Trail:

Alachua County
Name	Location	Notes
A. Quinn Jones Center	1108 Northwest 7th Avenue, Gainesville	A two-story brick building that originally served as Lincoln High School and opened in 1925 as the successor to Union Academy. Lincoln High School became one of the first accredited black high schools in Florida. The structure underwent significant renovations in the 1990s. The center is named after A. Quinn Jones, Lincoln High School's last principal.
Chestnut Funeral Home	18 Northwest 8th Avenue, Gainesville	One of the oldest businesses in the city, the Chestnut Funeral Home was founded in 1914 by Charles Chestnut Sr. and Matthew E. Hughes.
Damascus Cemetery	Along County Road 236 just east of Interstate 75 in Bland	A cemetery formerly associated with the now-demolished Damascus Church, built in 1900.
Dunbar Hotel	732 Northwest 4th Street, Gainesville	In the early 20th century, it was the only hotel in Gainesville to accommodate African Americans. The resort was owned by the Dunbar family. After undergoing restoration work, the former hotel now serves as the headquarters for Pleasant Place Facilities for Single Mothers.
First Morning Missionary Baptist Church	115 Northwest 55th Street, Gainesville	A place of worship housing a congregation founded in Rutledge, a community established for former slaves during the Reconstruction era. The present-day church was erected at its current location in 1955.
Friendship Baptist Church	426 Northwest 2nd Street, Gainesville	A c. 1911 Romanesque-Gothic Revival-style church. The congregation was organized in 1888, although fire destroyed its original building in 1911.
Greater Liberty Hill United Methodist Church	7600 Northwest 23rd Avenue, Gainesville	Although the current iteration of this church was constructed in the 1950s, its congregation dates back a century further. This church also served as a meeting place for the Farmer's Aide Society, a group of early local black farmers. An affiliated educational institute, the Liberty Hill School, became one of the first schools for African American youth in the Gainesville area and was built in 1892.
Haile Homestead	8500 Southwest Archer Road, Gainesville	A former slave plantation erected in 1856 for Serena and Thomas Haile, which previously included 18 slave cabins. Thomas reported that he owned 66 slaves. The Hailes declared bankruptcy in 1868 due to crop failures.
Hawthorne Historical Museum and Cultural Center	7225 Southeast 221st Street, Hawthorne	Originally an African American house of worship, New Hope United Methodist Church, founded in 1907. It was later moved four blocks away and restored and transformed into a museum during the 1990s.
Institute of Black Culture	1510 West University Avenue, Gainesville	An archive founded in 1971. It contains artifacts and resources related to black University of Florida (UF) students.
Jesse Aaron House	1207 Northwest 7th Avenue, Gainesville	A house erected in 1925 by Jesse Aaron, a black Seminole. Aaron was a well-known woodcarving artist whose works have been collected by individuals and museums.
Marjorie Kinnan Rawlings Historic State Park	18700 South County Road 325, Cross Creek	A state park memorializing Pulitzer Prize-winning author Marjorie Kinnan Rawlings, who moved to Cross Creek in 1928. The park also includes a tenant house, relocated there in 2000, to showcase a type of residence that rural African American Floridians lived in during the early 20th century.
Mount Pleasant AME Church	630 Northwest 2nd Street, Gainesville	Later known as Mouth Pleasant United Methodist Church, this place of worship houses the oldest African American congregation in the city, organized in 1867. The present structure opened around 1906, after the original building was destroyed by a fire in 1903.
Old Cotton Club	837 SE 7th Avenue, Gainesville	Formerly used as Camp Blanding's post exchange, built between 1940 and 1941. After World War II, the Perryman brothers relocated the building to Gainesville and repurposed it as a movie theater serving black customers.
Pleasant Street Historic District	Gainesville	The oldest continuously occupied black neighborhood in Gainesville, former slaves began settling in the area shortly after the American Civil War. Containing 255 historic structures, the district's boundaries are 1st Avenue, Northwest 2nd Avenue, Northwest 6th Street, and Northwest 8th Avenue.
Shady Grove Primitive Baptist Church	804 Southwest 5th Street, Gainesville	The current iteration of this church was erected in the 1930s, although the existence of the congregation can be traced back to the late 19th century. During the Civil Rights movement, the National Association for the Advancement of Colored People (NAACP) held meetings at this church.
Smathers Library	1508 Union Road, Gainesville	The library for the UF, which maintains a large collection of materials relating to the culture and history of African Americans.
St. Augustine Day Care	405 Northwest 4th Avenue, Gainesville	Previously a black Episcopal church constructed between 1875 and 1889, the building was later moved and repurposed into a parochial school in 1895, before becoming a daycare center in 1957 and then integrating in 1964.
Union Academy	524 Northwest 1st Street, Gainesville	Founded by the Freedmen's Bureau in the 1860s, the Union Academy provided K–12 education for local African American students for nearly 60 years. It was the second-largest school in Florida constructed by the bureau, with a second floor added in the 1890s.
Wabash Hall	918 Northwest 5th Avenue, Gainesville	A two-story building with a grocery store operating on the ground floor, while students from Lincoln High School used the second floor for proms and football game victory celebrations.
Waldo Cemetery	Waldo	A cemetery for early black settlers in the community. Among those interred there are American Civil War veterans and Henry Hill, Waldo's first African American firefighter.

Baker County
Name	Location	Notes
Olustee Battlefield Historic State Park	5815 Battlefield Trail Road, Sanderson	The site of Florida's only major American Civil War battle, which occurred on February 20, 1864. Of the Union troops involved in the battle, about one-third were African American.

Bay County
Name	Location	Notes
Massalina Bayou	Panama City	A bayou named after Josea Massalina, an African American Spanish fisherman who founded the small community of Red Fish Point, which stood where Tyndall Air Force Base is now located.
The Rosenwald School	624 Bay Street, Panama City	A school for African American students in Bay County during the Jim Crow era.

Bradford County
Name	Location	Notes
Robinson Jenkins Ellerson High School	Intersection of Florida and Pine streets, Starke	The successor of Bradford County's first school for black students, Robinson Jenkins Ellerson High School opened in 1913. It is named after the three men who founded the school: Robert Ellerson, Professor A. O. Jenkins Sr., and Rev. James Robinson.

Brevard County
Name	Location	Notes
Bethel African Methodist Episcopal (AME) Church Community Cemetery	4725 N Tropical Trail, Merritt Island	A cemetery associated with one of the oldest African American churches on Merritt Island and formerly referred to as White Lily Cemetery. Gravestones date as far back as 1919.
Brothers Park	2518 Race Street, Melbourne	A park dedicated to the former site of the Melbourne School, the first black school in the southside of the city, built from 1920 to 1921. It was destroyed by fire in 1953, except for a band room. The park is named after Wright Brothers, one of three black men who were the first to settle in present-day Melbourne.
Gibson Tenement Houses	Chain of Lakes Heritage Park, Titusville	A group of three remaining shotgun houses erected by William Gibson and his family in the early 20th century, which were primarily occupied by farmers and railroad workers. These residences were later relocated to the Titusville campus of Eastern Florida State College.
Harry T. Moore Center	307 Blake Avenue, Cocoa	This building is named in honor of Harry T. Moore. He and his wife were killed by an explosion at their house in 1951 in Mims due to Harry being the NAACP's Florida chapter president. A former black high school, the structure now houses the Leon and Jewel Collins Museum of African American History and Culture.
Harry T. & Harriette V. Moore Cultural Center	2180 Freedom Park, Mims	Opened in 2004, the cultural center is a museum and archive located at the site of Harry T. & Harriette V. Moore's residence. Both served as civil rights activists, with Harry becoming the NAACP's Florida chapter president. The couple died in 1951 due to their house being bombed.
Hilltop Cemetery/Cemetery Hill	Pine Street and Taft Avenue, Cocoa	An African American cemetery established in the 1880s. Hurricane Gabrielle in 2001 uncovered 58 lost graves, bringing the total to 475.
Malissa Moore House	215 Stone Street, Cocoa	A residence built along the Indian River in 1890 and was later moved and transformed into a restaurant. It was named after Malissa Moore, who raised funds for erecting Mount Moriah AME Church.
Richard E. Stone Historic District	121-304 Stone Street, Cocoa	A historic district named after Richard E. Stone, who in 1935 invented the automobile turn signal. The building at 304 Stone Street is Mount Moriah AME Church, Cocoa's first black church.
Stone Funeral Home	516 King Street, Cocoa	One of the oldest active businesses in Brevard County, opening in 1923. It is named after brothers Richard E. Stone and Rev. Albert T. Stone, who operated the funeral home in the 1930s and expanded the business to include branches in Cocoa, Fort Pierce, and Melbourne.

Broward County
Name	Location	Notes
African-American Research Library and Cultural Center	2650 Sistrunk Boulevard, Fort Lauderdale	An archive of more than 75,000 resources relating to Africans and African Americans. This includes material from the Association for the Study of African American Life and History, Bethune-Cookman University, W. E. B. Du Bois, Alex Haley, Langston Hughes, and Carter G. Woodson.
Colored Beach	6503 North Ocean Drive, Dania Beach	An African American beach established in the 1950s at the north end of the present-day Dr. Von D. Mizell-Eula Johnson State Park. Until 1965, beachgoers were required to take a ferry to the site from Port Everglades.
Dr. James F. Sistrunk Boulevard Historical Marker	Von Mizell Library, 1408 Sistrunk Boulevard, Fort Lauderdale	A memorial to Dr. James F. Sistrunk, Fort Lauderdale's first and only black physician for nearly 16 years.
Ely Educational Museum	595 Northwest 15th Street, Pompano Beach	A museum operated at the former home of Blanche Ely, a Pompano Beach black educator and civic pioneer.
Old Dillard High School	1001 Northwest 4th Street, Fort Lauderdale	Served as the first school in Fort Lauderdale for African Americans. One of the principals, Clarence C. Walker, lobbied to have the school opened for nine-month sessions. Until 1942, African American schools in the area remained closed between November and March so that youth could assist with harvesting crops. The building is now used a museum.
St. Ruth Missionary Baptist Church	145 Northwest 5th Avenue, Dania Beach, FL 33004	A place of worship housing Dania Beach's first black church and school. It was founded in 1908 by Charlie Chambers and named after his daughter.

Calhoun County
Name	Location	Notes
Mayhaw Community	River Street, Blountstown	The remnants of a black community, featuring tenant homes erected in the 1930s.

Charlotte County
Name	Location	Notes
Blanchard House Museum	406 Martin Luther King Boulevard, Punta Gorda	A museum based in the former home of black sea captain Joseph Blanchard. Built in 1925, the Blanchard House Museum contains archives of materials relating to the culture and history of local African Americans.
Bethel African American Episcopal Church	260 East Olympia Avenue, Punta Gorda	An African American church constructed in the 1960s, replacing a building erected in 1897, which had been destroyed in 1960 by Hurricane Donna. Originally, the church met in a thatched-roof structure beginning in the mid-1880s. Its first service was attended by several white individuals, including Albert W. Gilchrist, who later served as Governor of Florida.
Cleveland Steam Marine Ways	5400 Riverside Drive, Cleveland	A machine shop for manufacturing luxury yachts. The Cleveland Steam Marine Ways owner, George Brown, hired both black and white people as shipbuilders in the early 20th century.
George Brown House	27430 Cleveland Avenue, Cleveland	This early 20th century home was named after George Brown, a businessman in the shipbuilding industry who hired both black and white people for his Cleveland Steam Marine Ways company.
New Operation Cooper Street	650 Mary Street, Punta Gorda	Formerly the site of Baker's Academy, the first black school in Charlotte County. By the 1960s, the building served as a community gathering place.
Punta Gorda station	1009 Taylor Road, Punta Gorda	A museum about local aviation and fishing, as well as its former status as an Atlantic Coast Line Railroad station. At the time of its construction in the 1920s, the Punta Gorda station was the southernmost train station in the United States.
St. Mark Missionary Baptist Church	402 Dupont Street, Punta Gorda	A church founded in the late 1880s by Dan Smith, a local black businessman, civic leader, and pioneer.

Citrus County
Name	Location	Notes
Frazier Cemetery	Intersection of East Tower Trail and Great Oaks Drive, Floral City	H. C. Frazier established this black cemetery in 1908.
Pleasant Hill Baptist Church	8200 East Magnolia Street, Floral City	The oldest house of worship in Floral City, the church was constructed between 1895 and 1910.

Clay County
Name	Location	Notes
Joseph Green House	531 McIntosh Avenue, Orange Park	A 1,250 square foot (116 m^{2}), two-story residence erected by Joseph Green around 1893. Green, a native of Mississippi, moved to Orange Park in the 1880s.
Orange Park Negro Elementary School	440 McIntosh Avenue, Orange Park	One of the few structures constructed by the Clay County School Board during the 1930s, it opened in 1938.

Collier County
Name	Location	Notes
Collier County Museum	3301 Tamiami Trail East, Naples	A museum that includes an exhibit about black Seminoles during the Second Seminole War.
Macedonia Baptist Church	1006 Third Avenue North, Naples	Established in 1929, this place of worship is the oldest black church in Naples. Relocated to its present site in the 1950s, the church also had an annex added to it in 1973.
Naples Railroad Depot	1015 5th Avenue South, Naples	A train station built in 1927 as part of the Seaboard Air Line Railroad. The site still includes the black-only waiting room used until the 1960s, as well as the stories of African American railroad workers.
Rosemary Cemetery	3301 Tamiami Trail East	A cemetery platted in 1934 that includes the reinterred remains of individuals buried at a cemetery that previously existed at Tenth Avenue South and Third Street. Until 1947, this burial ground served as the prominent cemetery of Naples.

Columbia County
Name	Location	Notes
Niblack Elementary School	837 Northeast Broadway Avenue, Lake City	A school erected in 1954 following the consolidation of black elementary schools in Columbia County. It is named after teacher, principal, and county supervisor Minnie Jones Niblack.
Trinity United Methodist Church	310 Martin Luther King Jr. Drive, Lake City	An African American congregation established in 1863 as Gethsemane Methodist Episcopal Church. The current church building was constructed in 1927.
Richardson High School	255 Coach Anders Way, Lake City	Constructed in 1957 for African American high school students. Although this education institute closed in the early 1970s, its cafeteria, basketball courts, and gymnasium are still standing.

Duval County
Name	Location	Notes
1960s Civil Rights Historic Site Marker	Hemming Park, Jacksonville	A monument to a sit-in that occurred nearby on August 27, 1960. Approximately 40 African Americans affiliated with the Youth Council went to lunch counters permitted to whites only at Woolworth and W. T. Grant stores. The protesters suffered injuries after being attacked by white patrons with axe handles and baseball bats.
Bethel Church	215 Bethel Baptist St, Jacksonville	A church built in 1904, replacing a building destroyed by the Great Fire of 1901. Also in 1901, six members established Afro-American Life Insurance, Florida's first life insurance company to enroll African Americans. Bethel Church's congregation dates back to 1838.
B. F. Lee Theological Seminary Building at Edward Waters College	1658 Kings Road, Jacksonville	A four-story building constructed at Edward Waters University (then known as Edward Waters College) between 1925 and 1927 for its seminary school, which was established in 1905.
Bishop Henry Y. Tookes House	1011 West 8th Street, Jacksonville	A residence built in 1939 by Bishop Henry Y. Tookes and his wife, Maggie. Bishop Tookes served in the Florida District of the AME Church and as chancellor of Edward Waters College. Under his leadership, the college constructed a library, a women's dormitory, and J. M. Wise Stadium.
Catherine Street Fire Station #3	1410 Gator Bowl Boulevard, Jacksonville	A 1902 fire station staffed by black firefighters during the Jim Crow era.
Centennial Hall at Edward Waters College	1658 Kings Road, Jacksonville	A building designed in 1916 by one of the few African American architects at the time, Rev. Richard L. Brown.
Clara White Mission	613 West Ashley Road, Jacksonville	A memorial dedicated to philanthropists Clara White and her daughter, Dr. Eartha M. M. White.
Genovar's Hall	638-644 West Ashley Street, Jacksonville	A building that previously housed a grocery store owned by Sebastian Genovar, a Minorcan, constructed from 1891 to 1895. Additionally, this three-story building contained a hotel and bar and at other times served as a community center.
J. P. Small Memorial Stadium	1701 Myrtle Avenue, Jacksonville	An early 20th century baseball park that originally served as a spring training facility for the Philadelphia Athletics and Brooklyn Dodgers. The stadium later became the home of the Negro American League's Jacksonville Red Caps. A black neighborhood grew around the stadium, which was named Durkeeville, after Dr. Jay Durkee and Joseph Harvey Durkee.
Kingsley Plantation	11676 Palmetto Avenue, Jacksonville	A plantation constructed on Fort George Island in 1817 and owned by Zephaniah Kingsley, who married several enslaved women. Significant restoration work on the plantation house occurred by the 1990s.
Masonic Temple, Most Worshipful Union Grand Lodge	410 Broad Street, Jacksonville	A Masonic lodge and commercial building for African Americans, constructed in 1912.
Matthew Gilbert High School	1424 Franklin Street, Jacksonville	Erected in 1926 to serve students in East Jacksonville and Oakland. Among the alumni was Robert "Bullet Bob" Hayes. Previously, the Florida Baptist Academy, established in the 1890s, occupied the site.
Moncrief Cemetery District	Intersection of Edgewood Avenue and Moncrief Road, Jacksonville	An area containing three black cemeteries known as Memorial, Sunset Memorial, and Pinehurst, which collectively had more than 6,000 graves. Inside Memorial Cemetery is the Lewis Mausoleum, the final resting place of Abraham Lincoln Lewis, founder of the Afro-American Life Insurance Company and American Beach.
Mount Olive AME Church	841 Franklin Street, Jacksonville	A church constructed between 1921 and 1922 and designed by Rev. Richard L. Brown, one of the few African American architects at the time.
Mount Zion AME Church	201 East Beaver Street, Jacksonville	A place of worship founded in 1866 by a group of freedmen. Although the church was destroyed by the Great Fire of 1901, it was built several months later.
Norman Studios	6337 Arlington Road, Jacksonville	A 1920s film studio owned by Richard E. Norman, a white filmmaker and silent film distributor who produced movies with casts and crews that were entirely African American. Works of Norman include the race films The Bull-Dogger and The Flying Ace.
Old Brewster Hospital	915 West Monroe Street, Jacksonville	Originally a home constructed in 1885, this structure became the first African American hospital in Jacksonville.
Old City Cemetery	Between East Union, Long, Jessie, and Washington streets, Jacksonville	An 1852 cemetery interring residents regardless of race or religion, though they were placed in different sections. Laura Adorkor Kofi and Clara and Dr. Eartha M. M. White are buried there. More than 10,000 people attended the internment of Kofi.
Old Jacksonville Beach Elementary School	376 4th Avenue South, Jacksonville	Originally known as the Jacksonville Beach Elementary School for Colored People, this four-room school was built in 1939. The building also served as a baby clinic, community center, and recreation center.
Old Stanton High School	521 West Broad Street, Jacksonville	Named after abolitionist and Secretary of War Edwin Stanton, the 1868 educational institute served as the first school for black youth in Jacksonville.
Ritz Theatre	829 North Davis Street, Jacksonville	A movie theater for African Americans constructed in 1929. The building also housed offices and retail stores. It has since been demolished, but a corner and the sign are now part of the LaVilla Museum and the current iteration of the Ritz Theatre.
Susie Tolbert House	1665 Pierce Street, Jacksonville	The home of Susie Ella Middleton Tolbert. She founded the Willing Workers Club and used her residence to house students at Edward Waters College.

Escambia County
Name	Location	Notes
African American Heritage Society	200 Church Street, Pensacola	A civic organization founded in 1990 and headquartered in the historic residence of Kate Coulson. The African American Heritage Society has produced a brochure listing 22 sites relating to local black history. This structure was built in 1895.
Daniel "Chappie" James House	1606 North Martin Luther King Boulevard (also known as North Alcaniz Street), Pensacola	A home where Lillie James, mother of Daniel "Chappie James Jr., educated black children. Chappie James had a notable career in the United States Armed Forces, including becoming the first ever African American four-star general.
John the Baptist Church	101 North 10th Avenue, Pensacola	Pensacola's first black church, established in the second half of the 1840s. It is the only remaining structure from the former African American community known as Hawkshaw.
Julee Cottage	210 East Zaragoza Street, Pensacola	A house at one time owned by Julee Panton, an African American woman who purchased the freedom of some slaves. Constructed in the late 18th century or early 19th century.
Mount Zion Missionary Baptist Church	528 West Jackson Street, Pensacola	A church for a congregation established in 1880, which first met on Tarragona Street at Number Two Hall. It is the second oldest black church in Pensacola.
Rosamond Johnson Monument	Gulf Islands National Seashore, Johnson Beach Road, Pensacola	A monument honoring Rosamond Johnson, a Pensacola resident who joined the U.S. Army but died during the Korean War at age 18 and received a posthumous Purple Heart. The beach where this landmark is located was also one of few beaches permitting African Americans during the Jim Crow era.

Flagler County
Name	Location	Notes
African American Cultural Center	4422 U.S. Route 1 North, Palm Coast	A complex containing a museum, full-scale library, and several classrooms. Exhibits in the museum include artifacts from private collections and presentations on African American filmmakers.
Masonic Cemetery	310 Martin Luther King Jr. Drive, Lake City	A historic black cemetery run by Espanola Lodge 161 in Bunnell, an African American Masonic lodge, this 5 acre (2.0 ha)-burial ground contains hundreds of plots.

Franklin County
Name	Location	Notes
St. Paul's AME Church	81 Ave I, Apalachicola	A congregation organized in 1866 under the name Methodist Episcopal Church for Colored People. In 1974, the place of worship joined the AME denomination and was renamed St. Paul's AME Church.
Fort Gadsden	Approximately 6 miles (9.7 km) southwest of Sumatra	Originally known as Negro Fort, the fort was used by Great Britain during the War of 1812 and staffed by African Americans and Native Americans.

Gadsden County
Name	Location	Notes
Arnett Chapel AME Church	209 South Duval Street, Quincy	A house of worship for a congregation organized in 1866, making it the oldest African American church in the county. The church's structure has had three iterations, with the current building constructed in 1940. It is named after Rev. Benjamin W. Arnett, who served as the Presiding Bishop in Florida for the AME denomination.
Good Shepherd Lodge	1001 West 4th Street, Quincy	Also known by its full name, the Good Shepherd Lodge of the Order of Emancipated Americans. The building includes of plaque dedicated to Witt A. Campbell, who served as the organization's financial officer, a civil rights activist, and a county school system employee for 44 years.
Eugene Lamb Jr. Recreation Center	420 Palmer Road, Midway	A community center named after a mayor of Midway, a predominately African American city incorporated in 1987.
Hardon Building	16 West Washington Street, Quincy	Site of one of the first electricity and ice plants in the city, the structure was named after black businessman William Hardon.
Masonic Lodge	122 South Duval Street, Quincy	A building used since 1907 as a meeting place for African American Masons. The structure was moved to its present location in 1976.
William S. Stevens High School	1004 West 4th Street, Quincy	A 1920s high school for black students, it was named after early 20th century physician William S. Stevens, who had a 50-year career in medicine and was known for his work during the 1906 yellow fever outbreak and the 1918 influenza epidemic.

Gulf County
Name	Location	Notes
George Washington High School	Kenny Street, Port St. Joe	A school for African American students built in 1952 to replace a smaller building used since 1940. The school's former gym now serves as a community center, while another structure houses a museum about the school.

Hamilton County
Name	Location	Notes
Eastside Memorial Cemetery	10937 Adams Memorial Drive, White Springs	A historic African American cemetery that served residents of southern Hamilton County.
Jasper Post Office	105 Martin Luther King Dr, Jasper	A 1930s post office built as part of the Works Progress Administration (WPA). The interior features murals painted by Pietro Lazzari, one of which depicts black laborers during the Great Depression.

Hernando County
Name	Location	Notes
Bethlehem Progressive Baptist Church	661 South Brooksville Avenue, Brooksville	A place of worship constructed in 1861 by Frank Sexton, a white man, for his former slaves.

Highlands County
Name	Location	Notes
Clarence Marion House	829 Lemon Avenue, Sebring	The residence of Clarence C. Marion, Sebring's first black principal, serving in that role at the E.O. Douglas School.
E.O. Douglas School Marker	School Street, Sebring	A memorial to an African American school named after First National Bank and activist E.O. Douglas. Erected in 1957, the school was converted to the Highlands County School Administration headquarters following integration.
First Missionary Baptist Church	662 Lemon Avenue, Sebring	One of the oldest black churches in Sebring, being established in 1913. It was constructed by John Grady, the town's first African American carpenter and second African American police officer.
Hopewell Public School	100 Ernest E Sims Street, Avon Park	The first school to serve black students in Avon Park.
Mount Olive AME Church	818 South Delaney Avenue, Avon Park	A place of worship housing a congregation established in 1920 by Rev. A. M. Wadell. The structure was erected sometime around 1940, when church members raised enough funds for a building.

Hillsborough County
Name	Location	Notes
Bing Rooming House	205 Allen Street, Plant City	A former hotel for black travelers, operating from 1928 to 1975, while a restaurant was added in 1931. The structure is now used as a museum about the history of African Americans in Plant City.
Black History & Art Museum	1112 East Scott Street, Tampa	A structure built in 1891 for Allen Template AME Church, which was later renamed Paradise Missionary Baptist Church. It now serves as a museum and archive with hundreds of artifacts, documents, and pictures relating to African American history.
Dr. Walter Smith Library	905 North Albany Avenue, Tampa	A library named after Dr. Walter Smith, who served as a president of Florida A&M University (FAMU) and authored a book on Florida's historically black colleges and universities (HBCU), The Magnificent Seven.
Glover School	5104 Horton Road, Plant City	A school erected in 1933 in the Bealsville area, a free black community first settled in 1865. Residents had to raise funds to build the school.
Helping Hand Day Nursery	623 East 7th Avenue, Tampa	A nursery and school established in 1924. Notably, former Florida legislator Jim Hargrett was a student there.
Jackson Rooming House	851 Zack Street, Tampa	Originally a two-story family residence constructed around 1900. Later, 24 rooms were added to offer lodging to African Americans traveling to Tampa. It is located one block from Tampa Union Station.
La Unión Martí-Maceo	1226 East 7th Avenue, Tampa	A social club founded in 1900 and constructed in 1909 by Afro-Cubans in Tampa's Ybor City. In 1965, the club moved to its current location. La Unión Martí-Maceo is named after José Martí and General Antonio Maceo, a liberation activist and Cuban Army of Independence commander, respectively.
Oaklawn Cemetery	606 E. Harrison Street, Tampa	Tampa's oldest public cemetery, it opened in 1850. An unnamed slave was the first person interred at this cemetery.
North Franklin Street Historic District	Tampa	A black neighborhood founded around 1900 and reached its peak in the 1930s. Sit-ins occurred in February 1960 at the Woolworth department store at the intersection of Franklin and Polk streets. The district's boundaries are East Fortune, East Harrison, and Franklin streets and Florida Avenue.
Robert W. Saunders Sr. Public Library	1505 Nebraska Avenue, Tampa	Originally known as the Ybor City Library, it was renamed in 2003 to honor Robert W. Saunders Sr., who succeeded Harry T. Moore as the NAACP's field director due to Moore being murdered in 1951.
St. Paul AME Church	506 East Harrison Street, Tampa	Constructed between 1906 and 1917, the church served as a location where civil rights activists met in the 1950s and 1960s to organize Freedom Marches and other forms of protest.
St. Peter Claver Catholic School	1401 Governor Street, Tampa	Opened in 1894, it is the oldest former African American-only educational institute in Hillsborough County still functioning as a school. The school closed during the governorship of Park Trammell due to three white sisters being accused of teaching black students, in violation of a law created in 1895, which was later declared unconstitutional.

Indian River County
Name	Location	Notes
Old Macedonia Colored Church	28th Court and Martin Luther King Jr. Boulevard (45th Street), Gifford	Built in 1908, one year after a white couple named Murray E. and Sarah Braddock Hall donated land to the congregation. Sebastian Methodist Church also contributed pews and a bell.

Jackson County
Name	Location	Notes
Little Zion School	Little Zion Road, Sneads	A historic schoolhouse for African American students. It is located next to the church and cemetery of the same name.
Renaissance Park	5989 Hartsfield Road, Greenwood	A park spanning approximately 40 acres (16 ha) that contains materials relating to the history of early rural living in Florida. African American artisans hosted biannual festivals to demonstrate their trades at this park.
St. Luke Baptist Church	4476 East Jackson Street, Marianna	A church constructed in 1921 for a congregation founded in 1867. It is one of the oldest church buildings for African Americans in the city. The church was nearly destroyed by Hurricane Michael in 2018, but plans for restoration and a park are ongoing as of 2025.

Jefferson County
Name	Location	Notes
Elizabeth School	Across the street from Elizabeth Missionary Baptist Church (669 Groover Road, Monticello)	A school completed by 1938 as part of a WPA project, allowing students to move out of the Masonic Hall and into a three-room facility.
Old Howard Academy	665 East Chestnut Street, Monticello	An educational facility to replace the original buildings, both destroyed by a fire. A historical marker is located near the structure. One building became an elementary school in 1940, while another became a high school.

Lake County
Name	Location	Notes
Ace Theatre	1609 East Bates Avenue, Eustis	A movie theater erected in the late 1940s for African American patrons. It was transformed into a church after integration but has since been abandoned.
Eustis High School – Cartwright Campus	1801 Bates Avenue, Eustis	Constructed in 1925 to provide education for African American students during the Jim Crow era.
Mt. Homer/Mt. Olive Cemetery	15300-15456 Huffstetler Drive, Eustis	A cemetery for African Americans established in the late 19th century or early 20th century, with individuals interred there including members of fraternal organizations and mutual aid societies.
Townsend House	480 West Avenue, Clermont	The home of Clermont's first black residents, James and Sally DeVaughan Townsend. Constructed around 1915, the dwelling was moved in 2002 to the Clermont Historic Village.
Witherspoon Lodge of Free and Accepted Masons, No. 111	1410 North Clayton Street, Mount Dora	One of the oldest active black Masonic lodges in the state, with the building purchased in 1903. The lodge also hosts the Order of the Eastern Star and a women's auxiliary, while it previously housed a school for African American students until the Milner-Rosenwald School was built in 1926.

Lee County
Name	Location	Notes
Centennial Park	2100 Edwards Avenue, Fort Myers	A park containing the "Civil War's 2nd Regiment of U.S. Colored Troops" monument, which honors the African American Union soldiers who fought Confederates in Fort Myers in 1865.
McCollum Hall	2701 Dr. Martin Luther King Jr. Boulevard, Fort Myers	This building was a United Service Organizations entertainment venue during World War II. It served African Americans training at Buckingham and Page army airfields, with notable appearances including Louis Armstrong, Count Basie, and Duke Ellington.
Mount Olive AME Church	2754 Orange Street, Fort Myers	A place of worship whose congregation was established in 1895, making it one of the oldest churches in the Dunbar area. Originally meeting at the Lee County Courthouse, this church was erected in 1929.
Paul Laurence Dunbar School	1857 High Street, Fort Myers	Built in 1927, the school served African American high school students from as far away as Lakeland. The name honors Paul Laurence Dunbar, a black poet.
Williams Academy	1936 Henderson Avenue, Fort Myers	Originally a school erected in 1913. The 1942 addition of the building now houses an African American history museum, founded in 2001.

Leon County
Name	Location	Notes
Bethel Missionary Baptist Church	224 North Martin Luther King Jr. Boulevard, Tallahassee	A place of worship previously founded by Rev. James Page, a former slave from Virginia and the first ordained African American Baptist minister in Florida. Later, the church was pastored by Rev. Charles Kenzie Steele, a prominent local civil rights activist. The church was also used as a meeting place to organize the Tallahassee bus boycott.
Carnegie Library	445 Gamble Street, Tallahassee	Located at Florida A&M University (FAMU), the Carnegie Library includes the Black Archives Research Center & Museum, whose "vast collection includes slave irons, tribal masks, and art demonstrating the cultural maturity of African kingdoms," according to the St. Petersburg Times.
Florida State Archives	500 South Bronough Street, Tallahassee	A physical and online (via the Florida Memory program) collection of materials about Florida history.
First Presbyterian Church	102 North Adams Street, Tallahassee	A place of worship constructed in 1838. Although the church allowed membership for blacks and whites, slaves were originally required to sit in the north gallery.
Florida A&M University (FAMU)	1601 South Martin Luther King Boulevard, Tallahassee	Founded by the Florida Legislature in 1887 as the State Normal College for Colored Students, FAMU is the state's oldest HBCU. Thomas DeSaille Tucker served as its first president. This higher education institute transitioned into a four-year university and renamed itself FAMU in 1909.
Florida Historic Capitol Museum	400 South Monroe Street, Tallahassee	A museum inside the previous capitol building of Florida. It contains many exhibits on state history, including about Martin Luther King Jr., Harry T. Moore, integration, Jim Crow, racial violence, reconstruction, slavery, and the Tallahassee bus boycott.
Fred Douglas Lee Statue	Intersection of Georgia and Macomb streets, Tallahassee	A monument to Fred Douglas Lee, who in the late 1950s became Tallahassee's first black police officer.
Frenchtown Historic Community	Bounded by Brevard, Copeland, and Tennessee streets, and Martin Luther King Jr. Boulevard, Tallahassee	A historically black section of Tallahassee established in the early 1830s, the community began declining in the 1960s. Only a few of the original structures remain standing today.
Gibbs Cottage	2414 South Adams Street, Tallahassee	A home once owned by Thomas Van Renssalaer Gibbs, a state representative who introduced legislation to establish the educational institute now known as FAMU.
Greenwood Cemetery	1601 Old Bainbridge Road, Tallahassee	To protest a 1936 ordinance that prohibited burial plots from being sold to blacks in the Old City Cemetery, seven African Americans established the Greenwood Cemetery the following year after purchasing 16 acres (6.5 ha) of land.
Integration Statue	Legacy Walk, Tallahassee	A monument honoring three of the first black students to enroll at Florida State University (FSU) in the 1960s: Maxwell Courtney, Doby Lee Flowers, and Fred Flowers.
Jakes-Patterson Monument	1764 South Martin Luther King Boulevard, Tallahassee	A memorial to FAMU students Wilhelmina Jakes and Carrie Patterson, who on May 26, 1956, were arrested after refusing to move from the whites-only section of a bus. The incident inspired the Tallahassee bus boycott.
John Gilmore Riley House	419 East Jefferson Street, Tallahassee	A home owned by John Gilmore Riley, a late 19th century and early 20th century local civic leader and edcuator.
Knott House Museum	301 East Park Avenue, Tallahassee	At this former residence, built in 1843, Union General Edward M. McCook re-issued President Abraham Lincoln's Emancipation Proclamation on May 20, 1865, due to some ex-slaves not realizing they had been freed. Consequently, May 20 is locally celebrated as Proclamation Day.
McKinney House	438 West Georgia Street, Tallahassee	The residence of Nathaniel and Lucille McKinney, erected in 1945. Later, the home was owned by the second black female assistant principal in the Leon County school district.
Museum of Florida History	500 South Bronough Street, Tallahassee	A museum of state history, including about the African Americans who fought for the Union in the American Civil War in the battles of Natural Bridge and Olustee and the over 50,000 blacks who served in the United States armed forces during World War II.
Old City Cemetery	400 West Park Avenue, Tallahassee	Opening in 1829, this burial ground is the oldest public cemetery in Tallahassee. Until a 1936 ordinance, the cemetery interred both whites and blacks, including Thomas Van Renssalaer Gibbs, William Gunn, John G. Riley, and James Page.
Old Lincoln High School	438 West Brevard Street, Tallahassee	An educational facility constructed in the Frenchtown Historic District in 1926 to replace a frame building that the school moved into in 1906. The academic organization dates back to 1869, however.
Rosa Parks Marker and C.K. Steele Statue	111 West Tennessee Street, Tallahassee	A memorial dedicated to civil rights activists Rosa Parks and Rev. Charles Kenzie Steele.
St. James Colored Methodist Episcopal (CME) Church	104 North Bronough Street, Tallahassee	This place of worship is the oldest black church in Tallahassee, constructed in 1899.
Tallahassee Museum	3945 Museum Road, Tallahassee	Originally a plantation house constructed in the 1840s, the building is now a museum dedicated to local African American history. The property also includes a reconstructed slave cabin.
Tookes Hotel	412 West Virginia Street, Tallahassee	Initially the home of the black-only Bond Street School (organized in the 1930s) founder Dorothy Nash Tookes, she converted the residence to a hotel for African Americans during the Jim Crow era. Notable guests included Nat Adderley, James Baldwin, Cab Calloway, Ray Charles, and Lou Rawls.
Union Bank	219 Apalachee Parkway, Tallahassee	Chartered in 1833 or 1841, the financial institute became the National Freedman's Bank during the Reconstruction era to serve newly emancipated slaves.

Levy County
Name	Location	Notes
Rosewood, Florida, Heritage Marker	Approximately 9 miles (14 km) east of Cedar Key, along State Road 24	A memorial to the Rosewood massacre, which occurred in 1923. Following a white woman reporting being assaulted by a black man, an accusation which later turned out to be false, white people traveled to the all-black town of Rosewood from as far away as Georgia. Whites then attacked African Americans and burned down nearly all structures in Rosewood. At least 6 black people and 2 white people were killed, although some estimates of the death toll reached as high as 150.

Madison County
Name	Location	Notes
Four Freedoms Park	111 Range Street, Madison	A park dedicated to the emancipation of slaves. One of the memorials in the park is inscribed with the words "this monument is dedicated to the former slaves of Madison County, their supporters and the unsung heroes who gave their prayers, blood, sweat and tears to help make our community what it is today."
Madison Post Office	200 East Pickney Street, Madison	A post office that includes a mural by George Snow Hill, a WPA project depicting the cotton industry in North Florida.
Ray Charles Memorial	Haffye Hayes Park, 1376 Southwest Grand Street, Greenville	A monument to Ray Charles, who lived in Greenville during his childhood. The memorial includes a full-sized statue and a plaque providing a biography about him.

Manatee County
Name	Location	Notes
Family Heritage House Museum	5840 26th Street West, Bradenton	A museum and research facility founded in 1990, located at the Bradenton campus of the State College of Florida, Manatee–Sarasota. Among the materials available are information on free African American community in Spanish Florida, slavery in the United States, and the Underground Railroad.

Marion County
Name	Location	Notes
Fessenden Elementary School	4200 Northwest 90th Street, Ocala	An educational institute founded in 1868 and named after Ferdinand S. Fessenden, a wealthy businessman who funded the school.
Howard Academy	306 Northwest 7th Avenue, Ocala	Formerly a school for African American students, established in 1885. Later, the building became a community center.
Mount Zion A.M.E. Church	623 South Magnolia Avenue, Ocala	Constructed in 1891 for a congregation organized in 1866, it was the first brick church to be used by an African American congregation.
Second Bethel Baptist Church	1991 West Test Court, Dunnellon	A church completed in 1888. Rev. Henry Shaw served as pastor and was the area's first black minister. For about four months each year, the church also served as a school for African American students.
West Ocala Historic District	Along Silver Springs Boulevard between Interstate 75 and Pine Avenue, Ocala	A historic district featuring over 100 buildings associated with a black community that was prosperous from 1886 to 1920.

Miami-Dade County
Name	Location	Notes
Bill Baggs Cape Florida State Park	1200 South Crandon Boulevard, Miami	A site where black Seminoles and escaped slaves sought to flee to the Bahamas after the United States acquired Florida from Spain in 1821.
Black Archives	5400 Northwest 22nd Avenue, Miami	A research facility established by Dr. Dorothy Jenkins Fields in 1977. The center contains archives of articles, images, manuscripts, and other materials relating to local African American history dating back to 1896.
Booker T. Washington High School	1200 Northwest 6th Avenue, Miami	An educational facility for African Americans opened in 1927, despite protests by locals. It was the first school in the county to offer a 12th grade education to black students.
Chapman House	On the property of Booker T. Washington High School (1200 Northwest 6th Avenue, Miami)	A 1923 home erected by Dr. William A. Chapman Sr., the first African American to be hired as a disease consultant of the Florida Board of Health.
Charles Avenue Historic District Marker	Intersection of Charles Avenue and Main Highway, Miami (Coconut Grove)	The first black community on the mainland of South Florida established in the 1880s. Many residents of the district immigrated from the Bahamas for work at the Peacock Inn, the county's first hotel. One of the residents was Ebenezer W. F. Stirrup, present-day Miami-Dade County's first black millionaire.
Coconut Grove Cemetery	3650 Charles Avenue, Miami (Coconut Grove)	A cemetery established by the Coconut Grove Colored Cemetery Association in 1913. At least 700 people, including several early settlers of Miami, are interred there.
D. A. Dorsey House	250 Northwest 9th Street, Miami	The residence of Dana A. Dorsey, who moved to Miami in the late 1890s and was advertised as the city's first licensed black realtor. Dorsey also established Miami's Overtown, South Florida's first bank for African Americans, and the Dade County School Board's black advisory committee. During World War I, Dorsey served as the registrar for African Americans enlisting in the armed forces.
Evergreen Park Cemetery	3055 Northwest 41st Street, Miami	One of the county's oldest African American cemeteries, this burial ground contains almost 3,300 plots. Most of the bodies are located inside vaults that are above-ground.
Florida Memorial University	15800 Northwest 42nd Avenue, Miami Gardens	A college founded in 1968 after the merger and relocation of two HBCUs, the Florida Baptist Institute for Negroes (established in Live Oak in 1879) and the Florida Baptist Academy (established in Jacksonville in 1892).
Greater Bethel AME Church	245 Northwest 8th Street, Miami	A house of worship in Overtown for a congregation established in 1896, making it the oldest in Miami. The original building, constructed before 1899, was replaced with a larger structure in 1927.
Hampton House Motel	4240 Northwest 27th Avenue, Miami	A 20-room hotel and social center for African Americans constructed in 1953. Notable guests included Cannonball Adderley, Muhammad Ali, Count Basie, Cab Calloway, Duke Ellington, Ella Fitzgerald, Jackie Robinson, and Malcolm X, while the motel was also where Dr. Martin Luther King Jr. presented an earlier edition of his "I Have a Dream" speech.
Lincoln Memorial Park	3001 Northwest 46th Street, Miami	A cemetery for African Americans established in 1924. Notable burials include Gwen Cherry, the first black woman to serve in the Florida Legislature, and Dana A. Dorsey, the first African American billionaire in Miami.
Lyric Theater	819 Northwest 2nd Avenue, Miami	A movie and vaudeville theater for African American patrons constructed in 1915 by Gene Walker, becoming one of the major centers of entertainment for local blacks.
Mount Zion Baptist Church	301 Northwest 9th Street, Miami	A Mediterranean Revival-style house of worship for one of Miami's oldest African American congregations. The parishioners also raised funds to construct Christian Hospital, a black hospital.
Overtown	Miami	One of Miami's oldest neighborhoods, founded in the 1890s for workers of Henry Flagler's Florida East Coast Railway (FEC). Due to Jim Crow laws, African Americans were required to live west of the railroad tracks. Overtown's boundaries are Northwest Second and Third avenues and Northwest Eight and Tenth streets.
St. John's Baptist Church	1328 Northwest 3rd Avenue, Miami	A 1940 church building designed by the black architectural firm McKissack & McKissack for a congregation established in 1906.
Virginia Key Beach Park	4020 Virginia Beach Drive, Miami	Dade County officials designated this beach to be used by African Americans in 1945. Originally, this beach could only be accessed via boats to and from downtown Miami until the Rickenbacker Causeway opened two years later.

Monroe County
Name	Location	Notes
Bahama Village	Key West	The primary neighborhood for African Americans, first settled in the 1870s. It is bounded by Angela, Fort, Louisa, and Whitehead streets. State Representative Robert Gabriel lived in the neighborhood.
Bethel AME Church	223 Truman Avenue, Key West	A place of worship constructed in 1923 for a congregation dating back to 1878. The church replaced a building burned down the previous year in a fire that was suspected to have been started by the Ku Klux Klan (KKK).
Bill Butler Park	744 Poor House Lane, Key West	A public park established in 1986 and named in honor of William "Bill" Butler, a musician and founder of Key West Junkanoos, as well as a Welter's Coronet Band member. The park annually hosts the Junkanoo Parade, which celebrates African cultural traditions.
Church of God of Prophecy	815 Elizabeth Street, Key West	Previously a home constructed in the late 1920s, it was later converted into a church by Brother Kemp, a black Bahamian, and John Bruce Knowles Sr.
Community Pool	Dr. Martin Luther King Jr., Memorial Community Center (300 Catherine Street, Key West)	Due to Jim Crow laws prohibiting blacks from using beaches, a pool was constructed for them in 1946.
Cornish Memorial A.M.E. Zion Church	702 Whitehead Street, Key West	A church constructed in 1903 and named in memory of Sandy Cornish, a Bahamian immigrant who established the congregation.
George Adderley House	5550 Overseas Highway, Marathon	A house built around 1906 by George Adderley. He was a Bahamian immigrant and worked as a boatman, charcoal-maker, and sponger.
Harry S. Truman Little White House	111 Front Street, Key West	The place where President Harry S. Truman signed Executive Order 10308, which "secure[d] better compliance by contractors and subcontractors with laws that forbade discrimination because of race, creed, color or national origin," according to Visit Florida.
Higgs Beach Historic Marker	Atlantic Boulevard near White Street, Key West	In 1860, the U.S. Navy rescued hundreds of Africans from a ship headed to Cuba to sell them into slavery and transported them to Key West. Although some of them returned to Africa, 294 people perished due to illness and were buried in a mass grave.
Key West Cemetery	701 Passover Lane, Key West	A burial ground where Frank E. Adams, a black man, was interred. Adams was the first law enforcement officer murdered while on duty in the Florida Keys, in an incident that occurred on October 7, 1901.
Nelson English Park	Intersection of Amelia and Thomas streets, Key West	A park memorializing Nelson English, a local black civic leader and the Key West postmaster between 1882 and 1886.
Pigeon Key Historic District	Pigeon Key	A group of structures on Pigeon Key constructed between 1909 and 1920. They served as a camp for workers constructing the Overseas Railroad extension of the Florida East Coast Railway (FEC).
St. James First Missionary Baptist Church	312 Olivia Street, Key West	Freed blacks established this church in 1876, while those who moved to the Florida Keys to work on Henry Flagler's FEC also joined the congregation.
St. Peter's Episcopal Church	800 Center Street, Key West	A church erected in 1923 by Joseph Hannibal, the son of runaway slave Shadrack Hannibal. The congregation dates back to 1876, although the original structure was destroyed by a hurricane.
Trinity Presbyterian Church	717 Simonton Street, Key West	A 19th century racially integrated church established by Bahamian immigrants. It was initially known as Trinity English Wesleyan Methodist Church.
Veterans of Foreign Wars Walter R. Mickens Post 6021 and William Weech American Legion Post 168	803 Emma Street, Key West	A Veterans of Foreign Wars and American Legion post built in 1951. It is named after two African Americans killed in action, William Weech during World War I and Walter Mickens during World War II.

Nassau County
Name	Location	Notes
American Beach	Amelia Island	A beach on Amelia Island established in the 1930s for African Americans by Afro-American Life Insurance Company founder Abraham Lincoln Lewis.
Macedonia AME Church	202 South 9th Street, Fernandina Beach	An 1899 church building for a congregation formed in 1872. The structure replaced its previous house of worship at 7th and Beech Streets.
Mount Olive Missionary Baptist Church	941336 Old Nassauville Road, Nassauville	A church first erected in 1870 for African Americans, Native Americans, and mixed-race individuals. The house of worship was destroyed in 1920 but rebuilt later that year.
Williams House	103 South 9th Street, Fernandina Beach	An Antebellum mansion constructed in 1859 by surveyor Marcellus Williams. Although Confederate President Jefferson Davis is known to have stayed there, the dwelling later served as part of the Underground Railroad.

Okaloosa County
Name	Location	Notes
Carver-Hill Museum and Fairview Park Complex	895 McClelland Street, Crestview	Originally serving as military barracks during World War II, this facility was transformed into a museum about local black culture and history.
Indian Mound Lodge #1205	118 Kiwi Place, Fort Walton Beach	A lodge affiliated with the Improved Benevolent and Protective Order of Elks of the World. The building also houses Booker T. Washington Temple #863 and a collection of images relating to the African American history of Okaloosa County.
JRL Conyers Lodge #364	550 McDonald Street, Crestview	One of the oldest structures in the Crestview area, this lodge was constructed in 1909 and is affiliated with the Eastern Stars and Masons. The building was also used as a school in its early days.

Orange County
Name	Location	Notes
Callahan	Orlando	One of the oldest black neighborhoods in Orlando, it was established in 1886. Colonial Drive, Central Avenue, Division Street, and Orlando Blossom Trail serve as the district's boundaries.
Dr. I. S. Hankins House	219 Lime Street, Orlando	Home of Dr. I. S. Hankins, an early black physician in Orlando.
Hankins Building	647 West South Street, Orlando	An Art Deco structure erected in 1947 by Dr. Hankins.
Hannibal Square Historic Neighborhood	Morse and Pennsylvania boulevards, Winter Park	A neighborhood for African Americans that was first settled in the 1880s. There is an obelisk at the park in Hannibal Square to memorialize the neighborhood's history, including information on Winter Park's first two black aldermen, Frank Israel and Walter Simpson, both elected in 1887.
Moseley House	11 Taylor Street, Eatonville	The structure is the second-oldest surviving in Eatonville, being built around 1889. It is named after Matilda Clark Moseley, a friend of Zora Neale Hurston and niece of Joseph E. Clark, one of Eatonville's founders.
Nicholson-Colyer Building	29 West Church Street, Orlando	A tailor shop constructed in 1911, making it an early black business in Orlando. The name of the structure is derived from its builders, baker and grocer J.E. Nicholson from Canada and businessman J.A. Colyer.
Old Ebenezer Church	596 West Church Street, Orlando	A black house of worship built around 1900 for the Ebenezer United Methodist Church, also known as the Greater Refuge Church of Our Lord.
Old Mount Pleasant Baptist Church	701 West South Street, Orlando	A black house of worship erected in 1920, making it the oldest stone church in Orlando for African Americans. The Tabernacle of the Enlightened Church of God now occupies this structure, while the Mount Pleasant Church congregation moved to a building at Bruton and Prince Hall boulevards.
Wells'Built Museum	511 West South Street, Orlando	A building that opened in 1929 as the Wells' Built Hotel, which provided lodging in the Orlando area to African American travelers. Notable guests of the hotel included Roy Campanella, Ella Fitzgerald, Thurgood Marshall, and Jackie Robinson.
Zora Neale Hurston Museum of Fine Arts	227 East Kennedy Boulevard, Eatonville	A museum opened in 1990 that "the public can view the work of artists of African descent, who live on the Continent and/or in the Diaspora," according to N. Y. Nathiri, a former director. The museum is known for hosting the annual Zora Festival.

Osceola County
Name	Location	Notes
Bethel AME Church	1702 North Back Street, Kissimmee	A house of worship constructed in 1916 for a congregation established in 1888. Lawrence Silas's name is on its cornerstone, a prosperous African American cattleman.

Palm Beach County
Name	Location	Notes
B.F. James & Frances Jane Bright Mini-Park	East side of Northwest 5th Avenue and just south of Northwest 1st Street, Delray Beach	A park established in 1990 and named after the first two teachers at School No. 4, Delray Colored, located near the intersection of Northwest 5th Avenue and Northwest 1st Street.
Dr. Martin Luther King Jr. Memorial Park	2200 North Flagler Drive, West Palm Beach	This park is considered one of the largest memorials honoring Dr. Martin Luther King Jr.'s life, with many plaques and photographs.
Hurricane of 1928 African-American Mass Burial Site	Intersection of 25th Street and Tamarind Avenue, West Palm Beach	The 1928 Okeechobee hurricane caused Lake Okeechobee to push out of its banks, leading to at least 2,500 deaths, many of them black migrant farm workers. Although the white victims usually received a proper burial at Woodlawn Cemetery, the deceased black victims or those of an unknown race were burned or tossed into mass graves, including 674 bodies here and about 1,600 in Port Mayaca. This mass grave remained unmarked until 2003.
Industrial High School	800 11th Street, West Palm Beach	This secondary educational institution opened in 1917, becoming the county's first high school for African American students. In 1950, the school merged with Roosevelt High School.
Jenkins House	815 Palm Beach Lakes Boulevard, West Palm Beach	A residence built in 1946 for Dr. Wiley Jenkins and Roberta Robinson. A well-known pharmacist, Dr. Jenkins was posthumously named a Great Floridian.
LaFrance Hotel	140 Northwest 4th Avenue, Delray Beach	Constructed in 1947, this hotel was one of few between Fort Lauderdale and West Palm Beach to serve African Americans.
Mickens House	801 4th Street, West Palm Beach	A two-story home constructed in 1917 for Dr. Alice Mickens and her husband, Haley Mickens. The home hosted meetings for African American academics, celebrities, and civil rights leaders, such as Ralph Bunche, A. Philip Randolph, Mary McLeod Bethune, and Louis Armstrong.
Northwest Historic District	West Palm Beach	A black-only neighborhood during the Jim Crow era, situated from Northwest 2nd and Northwest 11th streets to Douglass and North Rosemary avenues. Some of the structures were designed by Hazel Augustus, West Palm Beach's first African American architect, and the Harvey and Clarke firm.
Old Pleasant City Elementary School	501 21st Street, West Palm Beach	A primary educational institution built in 1914 and designed by Hazel Augustus. At the time, it was one of only two schools for African Americans in West Palm Beach. Since being acquired by the city in the early 1960s, the building has served as a recreation and community center.
Osborne School	1726 Douglas Street, Lake Worth Beach	Designed by architect William Manly King, the Osborne School opened in 1948 and served as the city's only school for African American students, before closing in 1971.
Pine Ridge Hospital	1401 Division Avenue, West Palm Beach	A hospital built in 1923 and the only one to serve African Americans during the Jim Crow era. This medical center closed in 1956, and patients were instead treated at St. Mary's Hospital's black-only wing. In 1963, the former hospital was transformed into an apartment building.
Spady Cultural Heritage Museum	170 Northwest 5th Avenue, Delray Beach	Initially the 1926 residence of Delray Beach community leader and noted black educator Solomon P. Spady. Later, retired educator and historian Vera Rolle Farrington established a museum inside the former home.
St. Paul AME Church	3345 North Haverhill Road, West Palm Beach	The oldest church in the Pleasant City neighborhood of West Palm Beach, organized around 1900, not long after African Americans were being evicted from the Styx section of Palm Beach. In 2001, the congregation obtained a permit to construct a new building at 3345 North Haverhill Road and relocated there.
Tabernacle Baptist Church	801 8th Street, West Palm Beach	A place of worship whose congregation dates back to 1893, when African Americans lived in the Styx section of Palm Beach. The church also hosted present-day Palm Beach County's first black school by 1894.

Pasco County
Name	Location	Notes
Mount Zion AME Church	14440 7th Street, Dade City	A masonry church constructed in 1918 for a congregation from Freedtown, a community near Lake Pasadena that was abandoned following the Great Freeze during the winter of 1894/95.
St. Paul Missionary Baptist Church	14518 7th Street, Dade City	A church dedicated in 1920, whose congregation was organized in 1896 and originally met in a small wooden building nearby.

Pinellas County
Name	Location	Notes
Bethel AME Church	912 3rd Avenue North, St. Petersburg	A Gothic Revival-style church constructed in 1922, making it the first and oldest primarily black church in the city.
Dr. Carter G. Woodson African American Museum	2240 9th Avenue South, St. Petersburg	A museum opened in 2006 and named after Dr. Carter G. Woodson. It is a 4,500 square feet (420 m^{2}) building containing collections, classrooms, exhibits, offices, and reception rooms.
Heritage Village	Largo	A history park inside the Florida Botanical Gardens. Spanning about 21 acres (8.5 ha), the village has 28 historic buildings and homes, including one of the county's first black schools (built in 1915) and Sulphur Springs Depot, a 1924 railroad station with the black-only and white-only sections preserved.
Johnnie Ruth Clark Health Center at the Historic Mercy Hospital Campus	1344 22nd Street South, St. Petersburg	The oldest standing hospital in St. Petersburg, it was constructed in 1923 and served as the city's only medical facility for African Americans until 1966. During the 1960s, protests were held outside the hospital to advocate for desegregating medical centers.
Manhattan Casino	642 22nd Street South, St. Petersburg	Constructed by Elder Jordan and his five sons in 1925, the Manhattan Casino served as a cultural, entertainment, and social venue for black people during the Jim Crow era until closing in 1966.
Mount Olive AME Church	600 Jones Street, Clearwater	A Gothic Revival-style place of worship constructed in 1913, replacing another building built in 1896.
Royal Theater	1011 2nd Street South, St. Petersburg	Phillip F. Kennard, son of Francis J. Kennard, constructed this building in 1948. Through 1966, it served as one of two movie theaters for black patrons in the city. The building was renovated in 2002 and converted into a community center for youth.
Trinity Presbyterian Church/Happy Workers Day Care	902 19th Street South, St. Petersburg	Following approval by the Presbyterian Synod of Atlanta in 1928, this place of worship and day care center was built in 1929.

Polk County
Name	Location	Notes
Bethune Neighborhood Center	Intersection of 8th Street and Avenue E, Haines City	Formerly known as Oakland High School, which served African American students from the city, Davenport, Dundee, Lake Hamilton, Loughman, and unincorporated parts of northeastern Polk County.
Buffalo Soldiers Encampment Historical Marker	20 Lake Wire Street, Lakeland	A monument dedicated to the Buffalo Soldiers, whose 10th Cavalry Regiment established an encampment along Lake Wire's shore while waiting to be transported to Cuba during the Spanish–American War.
Evergreen Cemetery	State Highway 60 and Baker Ave North, Bartow	Among the oldest African American cemeteries in Polk County, one of the people interred there is Prince Johnson, a black man who voted with three other black men and 18 white men to incorporate Bartow as a town in 1882.
First Providence Missionary Baptist Church	1030 West King Street, Bartow	The oldest black congregation in Polk County, it was organized in 1856 and originally called Providence Colored Baptist Church. This house of worship also hosted the first school for African American students and the place where the First South Florida Missionary Baptist District Association was established in the 1890s.
Lawrence Brown House	470 South 2nd Avenue, Bartow	Constructed around 1884 and lived in by black businessman L.B. Brown, it is the city's oldest African American residence. Brown was posthumously honored as a Great Floridian.
Roosevelt School	115 East Street, Lake Wales	The oldest surviving school in Lake Wales, this educational facility was constructed in 1937 to serve African American students.
St. James African Methodist Church	Dr. Martin Luther King Jr., Boulevard, Bartow	A place of worship that began in 1894 as a small wooden building. It is the oldest remaining structure from Burnett's Quarters, a once-thriving black community named in honor of Thomas Burnett.

Putnam County
Name	Location	Notes
Bethel AME Church	179 Reid Street, Palatka	A church constructed between 1908 and 1912 for a congregation organized in 1866 and based in the Newtown area of Palatka. They previously met in a building at Emmett and Hotel streets starting in 1875.
Finley Homestead	522 Main Street, Palatka	The residence of Adam Finley, a local black barber and former slave. Dr. Howard E. Finley, Adam's son, became a prominent researcher, protozoologist, and head of Howard University's Department of Zoology.
Old Central Academy High School	127 Washington Street, Palatka	An educational institute founded in 1892. In 1924, Central Academy became the state's first African American high school to receive accreditation.

St. Johns County
Name	Location	Notes
Butler Beach	Near St. Augustine	Founded in 1927 by businessman Frank B. Butler of Lincolnville. For many years, it served as the only beach permitting access to African Americans between Daytona Beach and Jacksonville.
Cary A. White Sr. Complex, Florida School for the Deaf and the Blind	207 North San Marco Avenue, St. Augustine	A classroom and dormitory building at the Florida School for the Deaf and the Blind (FSDB) dedicated to the school's first deaf African American graduate, Cary A. White Sr. White also worked at the FSDB for 46 years, including as an assistant in Ray Charles's dorm, who was also a student at the school.
Excelsior High School	102 Martin Luther King Avenue, St. Augustine	A public high school for black students constructed in 1924. A state social services center was also based inside this school for about 50 years. The building now houses a cultural center and museum.
Fort Mose	Saratoga Boulevard near U.S. Route 1	A fort originally built in 1738, with a second iteration erected in 1752, which was discovered in the 1980s. The fort and the nearby town of Gracia Real de Santa Teresa de Mose became the first legally sanctioned community for free African Americans in an area of the modern-day United States. Slaves fleeing the Southern United States for Spanish Florida were offered freedom if they converted to Catholicism and joined a militia to protect the colony from British attacks. The fort is now recognized as the "premier site on the Florida Black Heritage Trail", according to Archaeology magazine.
Lincolnville Historic District	St. Augustine	A freedman neighborhood of St. Augustine whose boundaries are Cedar, Cerro, Riberia, and Washington streets, as well as DeSoto Place. Founded in 1866, the district now contains the city's largest concentration of late 19th century structures.
St. Benedict the Moor Catholic Church and School	78 Martin Luther King Boulevard, St. Augustine	The current church building was erected in 1911 and designed by architects Robinson and Reidy of Savannah, Georgia. Its original structure, constructed in 1898, served as the parish school, making it the oldest brick schoolhouse in St. Augustine. Three Sisters were arrested in 1916 for violating a Jim Crow era state law prohibiting white people from teaching black students.
St. Mary's Missionary Baptist Church	69 Washington Street, St. Augustine	A church constructed in 1920. Dr. Martin Luther King Jr. spoke there on June 9, 1964, and announced that he intended to participate in a sit-in at a local motel restaurant and correctly predicted that he would be arrested.
St. Paul African Methodist Episcopal Church	85 Martin Luther King Boulevard, St. Augustine	A Gothic Revival-style church constructed in 1910. During the Civil Rights era, the church served as a meeting place to plan demonstrations. Baseball legend Jackie Robinson once spoke to a crowd of about 600 protesters gathered at the church.
Willie Galimore Community Center	399 South Riberia Street, St. Augustine	A recreation center named after Willie Galimore, a St. Augustine native who earned All-American honors thrice with the Florida A&M Rattlers. In the NFL, Galimore played for seven seasons with the Chicago Bears and won the 1963 NFL Championship Game.

St. Lucie County
Name	Location	Notes
A. E. Backus Museum & Gallery	500 North Indian River Drive, Fort Pierce	A museum founded in 1960 by prominent Florida landscape painter A. E. "Bean" Backus. This museum and gallery contains the works of Bachus and other artists.
Zora Neale Hurston House	1734 Avenue L, Fort Pierce	A historic home that Zora Neale Hurston lived in in 1958 and 1959. During this time, Hurston worked for the Fort Pierce Chronicle newspaper and began writing The Life of Herod the Great.
Zora Neale Hurston Dust Tracks Heritage Trail	3008 Avenue D, Fort Pierce	A group of local landmarks in Fort Pierce associated with Zora Neale Hurston, including a library named after her at this address.
Zora Neale Hurston's Grave	Intersection of Avenue S and North 17th Street, Fort Pierce	Zora Neale Hurston was buried in a grave that remained unmarked until 1973. At that time, author Alice Walker and scholar Charlotte Hunt discovered her burial site and marked it.

Santa Rosa County
Name	Location	Notes
Mt. Pilgrim African Baptist Church	410 Clara Street, Milton	A church organized in 1866 and designed by prominent early 20th century Southern black architect Wallace Rayfield, his only known work in Florida. However, the history of the church dates back to 1845 as First Baptist Church, which had 83 white and 33 black people about four years later.
New Providence Missionary Baptist Church	4512 Church Street, Bagdad	One of the oldest churches in Santa Rosa County. Erected in 1901 and re-located to its current site in 1989. The church also initially served as a school because the area lacked a public school.

Sarasota County
Name	Location	Notes
Booker High School	3201 North Orange Avenue, Sarasota	Named after Sarasota County black educator Emma Edwina Benton Booker, who became principal of the only local elementary school for African Americans in 1918. Emma E. Booker Elementary and Booker Middle schools are also named in her honor.
Grover and Pearl Koons House	1360 13th Street, Sarasota	The home of Grover and Pearl Koons from 1927 to 1930. Later, the house was used for the Florida Academy of African American Culture.
Johnson Chapel Missionary Baptist Church	506 Church Street, Laurel	A church constructed in 1915 and originally called the Osprey Missionary Baptist Church. The building was moved to its present location in 1947 and has since been used as a church, community center, and Lilly White Lodge #22, an organization providing funeral benefits and medical treatment for African Americans.
Leonard Reid House	2529 North Orange Avenue (originally 1435 7th Street), Sarasota	The home of Leonard Reid, originally located on Coconut Avenue and erected in 1926. Reid was a founder of Sarasota's Overtown community.
Overtown Historic District	Sarasota	An area of Sarasota first settled in the 1890s by African Americans. Originally known as Black Bottom, the neighborhood was renamed Overtown by the mid-1920s. Many buildings were demolished beginning in the 1950s. The district is bounded by Fourth and Tenth streets and Orange Avenue and U.S. Route 1.

Seminole County
Name	Location	Notes
Hopper Academy	1101 Pine Avenue, Sanford	Formerly Sanford High School, one of the earliest high schools in Florida for African American students. Constructed between 1900 and 1910, the building has been used as a community center since the school was replaced by Crooms Academy.
John H. Hurston House	621 East 6th Street, Sanford	Home of Rev. John H. Hurston, the father of activist, anthropologist, and author Zora Neale Hurston.
Little Red Schoolhouse	519 Palmetto Avenue, Sanford	An educational institution originally known as Sanford Primary School #1 and built between 1906 and 1912. Now part of the Sanford Residential Historic District, the building later hosted the Tajiri Arts School until that school filed for voluntary dissolution in 2009.
St. James A. M. E. Church	819 Cypress Avenue, Sanford	This congregation was organized in 1867. Described by the St. Petersburg Times as "an excellent example of the work of black architect Prince W. Spears," its current building was constructed in 1913.

Sumter County
Name	Location	Notes
Community of Royal / Ebenezer AME Church	390 East Highway 462, Wildwood	A community just outside of Wildwood shortly after the abolition of slavery. Many of its founders were former slaves at the Green Plantation near the Withlacoochee River.
Dade Battlefield Historic State Park	7200 County Road 603, Bushnell	The site of the Dade massacre in 1835. Among the four survivors was Louis Pacheco, a slave and one of Major Francis L. Dade's interpreters.

Suwannee County
Name	Location	Notes
African Missionary Baptist Church	509 Walker Avenue Southwest, Live Oak	A house of worship constructed in 1910. However, its congregation dates back to 1868, who erected the original church building about five years later. One of its pastors, Dr. George P. McKinney Sr., served for 26 years beginning in 1890 while also working as an editor for The Florida Baptist, The Florida Baptist Herald, and The Florida Baptist Watchman.

Taylor County
Name	Location	Notes
Jerkins High School	1412 Martin Luther King Avenue, Perry	An educational institute constructed in 1931 for African American high school students, replacing two schools that burned down around 1919 and 1923. The building was named Jerkins High School in 1946, in honor of its first principal, Henry R. Jerkins. Although closed after integration, the structure has since been used as a community and civic center.
New Brooklyn Missionary Baptist Church	Intersection of U.S. routes 19 and 27, Perry	A predominately African American church established in 1914. It has since been remodeled twice, in 1963 and 1989.
Old Perry Post Office	201 East Green Street, Perry	A post office that previously contained a George Snow Hill mural known as "Cypress Lodging," painted in 1938 for a Public Works of Art Project. The mural depicts the local logging industry and its many African American workers. However, the mural was moved to the current post office in 1987.
Springhill Baptist Church and Cemetery	462 Myrtle Street, Perry	A church housing a congregation of free African Americans organized in 1853. After being burned down by the KKK in 1923, the church was rebuilt in 1942.

Volusia County
Name	Location	Notes
African American Museum of the Arts	325 South Clara Avenue, DeLand	A museum established in 1994 that includes works from black artists, as well as over 150 artifacts from various African countries.
Bethune–Cookman University	640 Mary McLeod Bethune Boulevard, Daytona Beach	A higher education institution established in 1923 upon the merger of Mary McLeod Bethune's Daytona Educational and Industrial Training School for Negro Girls and the Cookman Institute. Bethune, a prominent black educator and civil rights activist, managed to receive funding for the school from some wealthy individuals, including James Gamble and Thomas H. White.
Bethune–Volusia Beach	Approximately 6 miles (9.7 km) south of New Smyrna Beach along State Road A1A	Founded by Mary McLeod Bethune in 1940, the beach served as a resort for African Americans during the Jim Crow era.
Childhood Home of Mayor Yvonne Scarlett-Golden	506 South Street, Daytona Beach	A residence named after Yvonne Scarlett-Golden, who served as Daytona Beach's first African American mayor from 2003 until her death in 2008. Scarlett-Golden's uncle bought this house in the 1860s.
Freemanville	3431 Ridgewood Avenue, Port Orange	A section of Port Orange first settled in 1867 by emancipated slaves. The city holds an annual festival called Freemanville Day on the second Tuesday of February. According to UF professor Kevin McCarthy, "Freemanville may have been the first and largest settlement of freedmen in the South."
Garfield Cemetery	Intersection of Garfield Avenue and Lakeshore Drive, Deltona	An African American cemetery with 13 known graves, ranging in date from the late 19th century to the mid-20th century.
Howard Thurman House	614 Whitehall Street, Daytona Beach	This house served as the boyhood home of Howard Thurman from 1900 until he attended high school in Jacksonville. Thurman pursued a career in ministry and inspired some civil rights activists, including Martin Luther King Jr.
Jackie Robinson Memorial Ball Park	105 East Orange Avenue, Daytona Beach	A memorial to Jackie Robinson, the first African American Major League Baseball (MLB) player in the modern era. In 1946, one year before joining the MLB, Robinson played for the Brooklyn Dodgers' farm club, which was based in Daytona Beach.
J. W. Wright Building	258-264 West Voorhis Avenue, DeLand	A building erected in 1920 and designed by Francis Miller, an architect active during the 1920s Florida land boom. It was named after businessman James Washington "J. W." Wright.
Mary McLeod Bethune Home	Bethune–Cookman University campus, Daytona Beach	A two-story frame vernacular home constructed in 1913, civil rights activist and educator Mary McLeod Bethune lived there until dying in 1955, while Eleanor Roosevelt once stayed in the guest room. The dwelling is now used as a museum.
Mount Moriah Baptist Church	941 North Orange Avenue, Port Orange	Erected in 1911, this place of worship is the only remaining structure from the Freemanville community. The congregation was established decades earlier by slaves emancipated after the American Civil War.
Museum of Arts and Sciences - African Art Gallery	352 South Nova Road, Daytona Beach	A museum that "houses one of the best African art collections in the South," according to journalist James C. Clark, along with having a wing dedicated to the history and culture of African Americans in Florida.
Old DeLand Memorial Hospital	240 North Stone Street, DeLand	A hospital completed in 1926 to provide medical services to African American residents of Volusia County. Prior to then, black residents had to seek medical attention at the offices of local physicians and then receive care inside the home of a midwife or nurse.
St. Rita's Black History Museum	314 North Duss Street	A former house of worship constructed in 1899 to serve African American Catholics. The congregation built another parish house in 1956 while moving the 1899 structure to its current location.
Yemassee Settlement	DeLand	A Progressive Era black neighborhood in DeLand, located in the vicinity of Adelle, Clara, Euclid, and Voorhis avenues. The structures within the district are among the oldest associated with African Americans in the city.

Wakulla County
Name	Location	Notes
Old Shadeville High School Marker	87 Andrew Hargrett Sr., Road, Shadeville	A memorial to an educational facility that served black high school students for about 32 years, until closing in 1967 due to integration. It was constructed as an addition to Shadeville Elementary School, a building granted in 1909 to the school board.

Walton County
Name	Location	Notes
Gladys Milton Memorial Library	261 Flowersview Boulevard, Paxton	A library named after Gladys Nichols Milton, a midwife, local birthing center operator, and Florida Women's Hall of Fame inductee. The library contains materials relating to the career of Milton, which spanned from 1959 to 1999.
Jordan Theater	Dorsey Avenue and Florida Street, Defuniak Springs	Originally a movie theater constructed in 1945 by John Booker Jordan for black patrons, it was later converted to a teen club and then a church.
Tivoli School	145 Park Street, Defuniak Springs	An educational facility that opened in 1908 and served African American elementary and junior high school students before expanding to all grades by 1938. The school closed in 1969 due to integration but is now used for the Walton County School Board's administrative offices.

Washington County
Name	Location	Notes
Moss Hill Church	Greenhead and Vernon roads, Vernon	A place of worship constructed in 1857 by parishioners and slaves. The St. Petersburg Times noted in 1994 that "many of the planks still bear the hand or fingerprints of the workers, and the barefooted imprints of children."
Roulhac High School	101 North Pecan Street, Chipley	Named after county black educator Thomas J. Roulhac, this educational institution served as an African American-only high school from 1938 until integration in 1968. At the time of its construction, this school was the first in Chipley to serve African American high school students.
Sylvania AME Church	3079 Sylvania Road, Vernon	A church first recorded in county deed records in 1902. Previously, African Americans attended Moss Hill Church with white parishioners. Congregants of Sylvania AME Church later built another structure.
Vernon Elementary School	3665 Roche Avenue, Vernon	Despite Jim Crow laws, the present-day Vernon Elementary School served white and black students. Due to a lack of funds to build a new educational institution, parts of three schools that closed were attached to this one.
