= Charlotte Jane Memorial Park Cemetery =

Cemetery in Miami, Florida

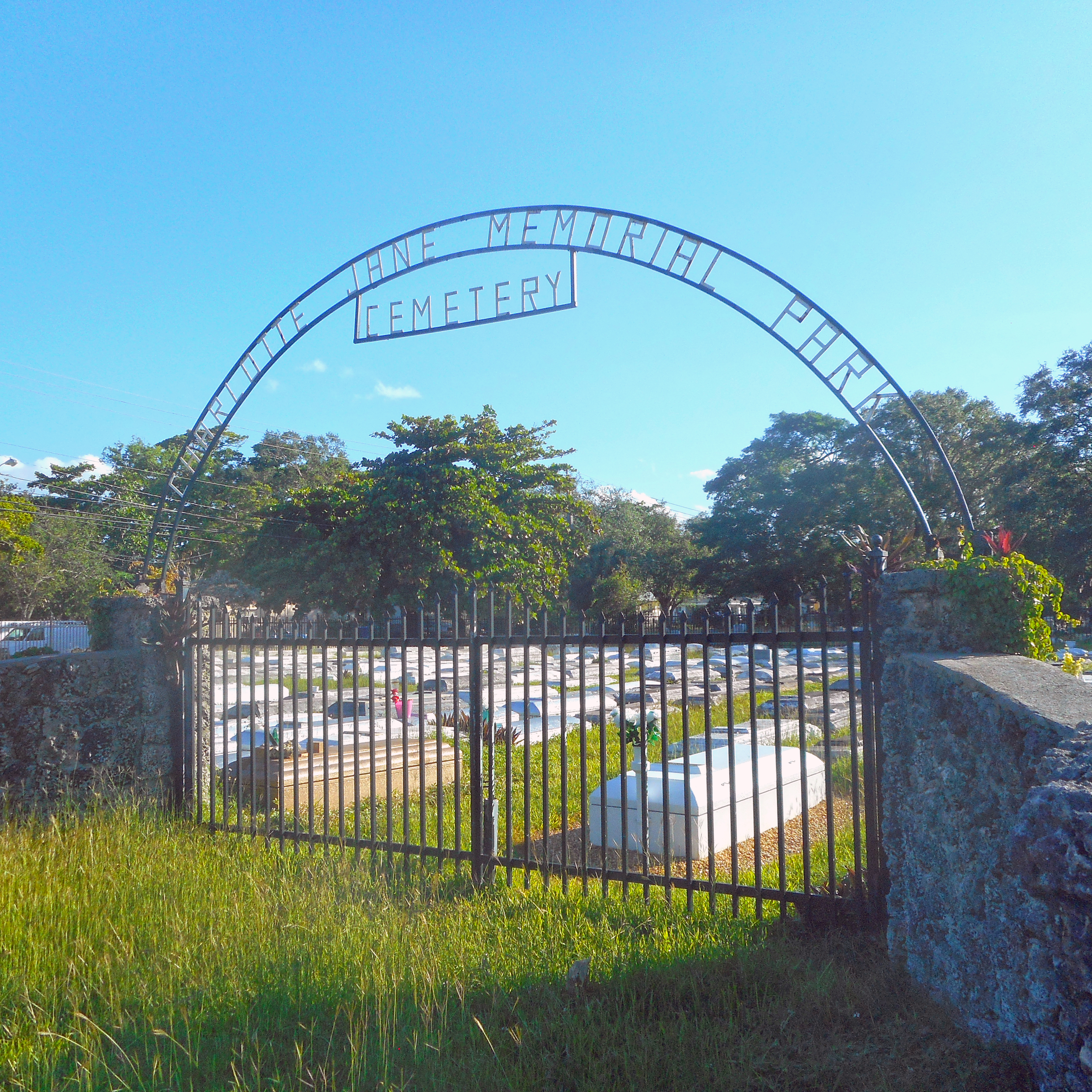
- Entrance to the C.J.M.P. Cemetery

Details
- Location: 3575 Douglas Rd, Miami, FL
- Country: US
- Coordinates: 25°43′30″N 80°15′10″W
- Style: Above ground vaults
- Find a Grave: Charlotte Jane Memorial Park Cemetery

Charlotte Jane Memorial Park Cemetery formerly known as Coconut Grove Bahamian Cemetery, is a historic cemetery in Miami, Florida where many Bahamian settlers were buried.

== Geography ==
The historic Coconut Grove Cemetery is located at 3575 South Douglas Road in Coconut Grove.

== History ==
Charlotte Jane Memorial Park Cemetery was first used as a graveyard in the late 1850s. The land for the cemetery was purchased in 1913 for a total of $140.00 by five prominent families: the Burrows, Higgs, Reddick, Ross and E.W. F. Stirrup.

The cemetery was renamed Charlotte Jane Memorial Park after the wife of E.W.F. Stirrup a prominent land owner and millionaire in the Grove. The layout of the cemetery is of the above the ground burial style which is very popular in locations at or below sea level and are prone to flooding. The Coconut Grove Cemetery is located at 3650 Charles Avenue in the Coconut Grove District of Miami, Florida. The cemetery is a historic site for the Coconut Grove Bahamian community.

== "Thriller" ==
Charlotte Jane Memorial Park served as an inspiration for the graveyard scene in the Michael Jackson’s song "Thriller". According to John Landis, the music video's director, pre-production was done at the cemetery, which in turn, was replicated at a disused meatpacking plant in Los Angeles.

== Burials ==
Many prominent Bahamian pioneers are buried in this cemetery in either marked or unmarked graves:

- Joseph Mayor, owner of bicycle shop in the Grove.
- Daniel Anderson, seaman
- Catherine Anderson, one of the founders of Christ Episcopal Church
- Captain John Sweeting, land developer and commercial fisherman

== Gallery ==
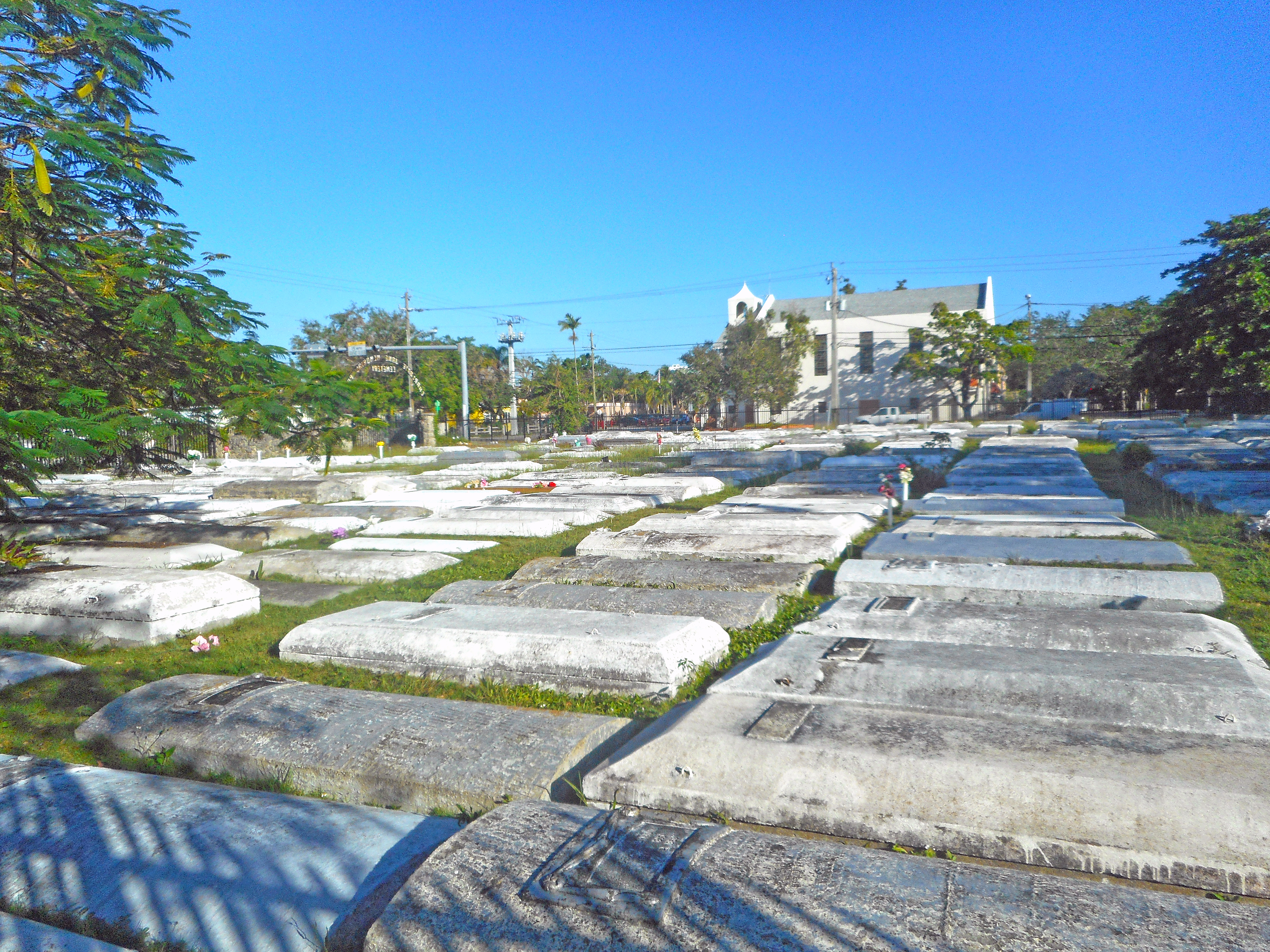
General view looking north

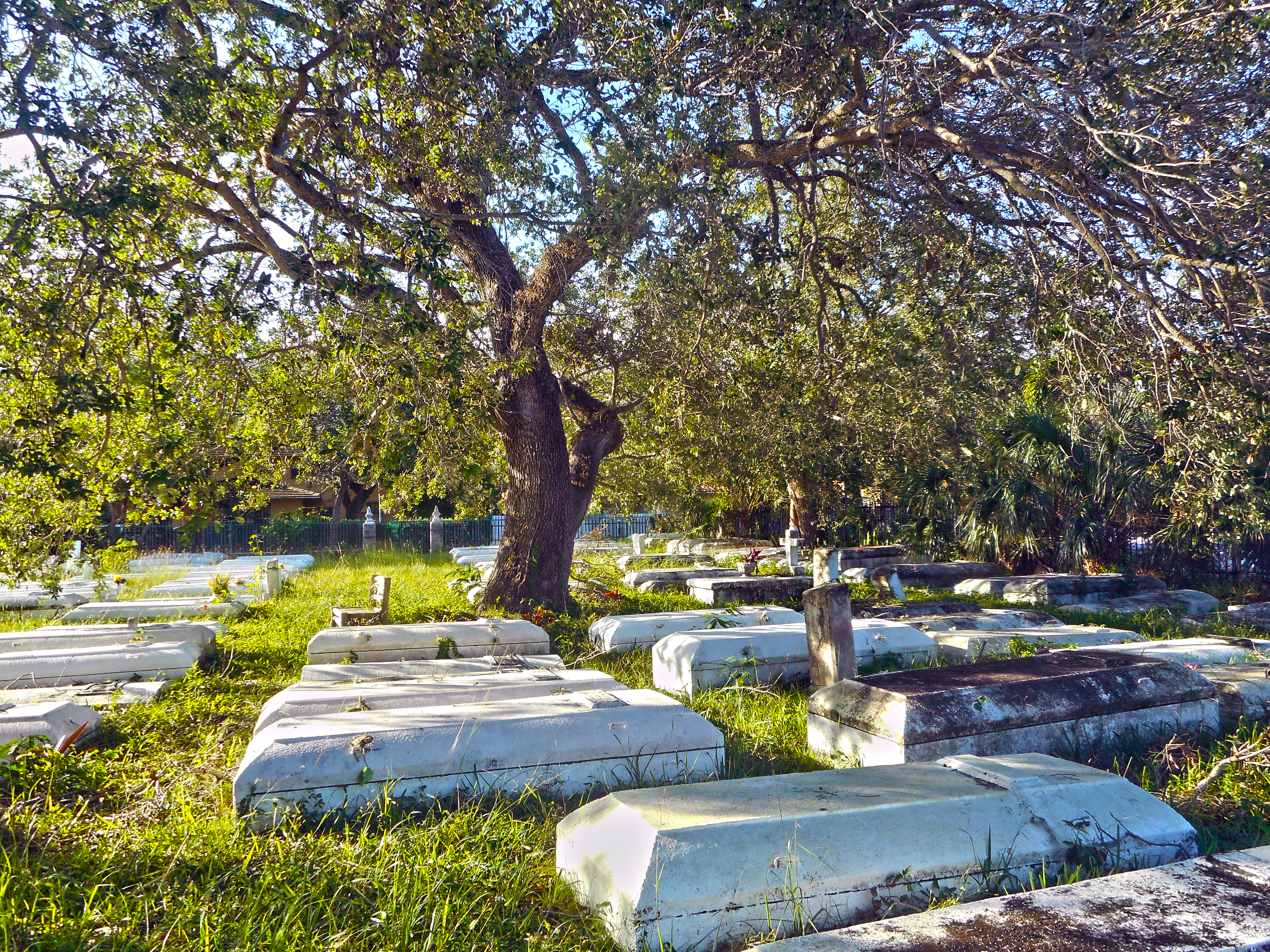
Landscape with coffins and tree

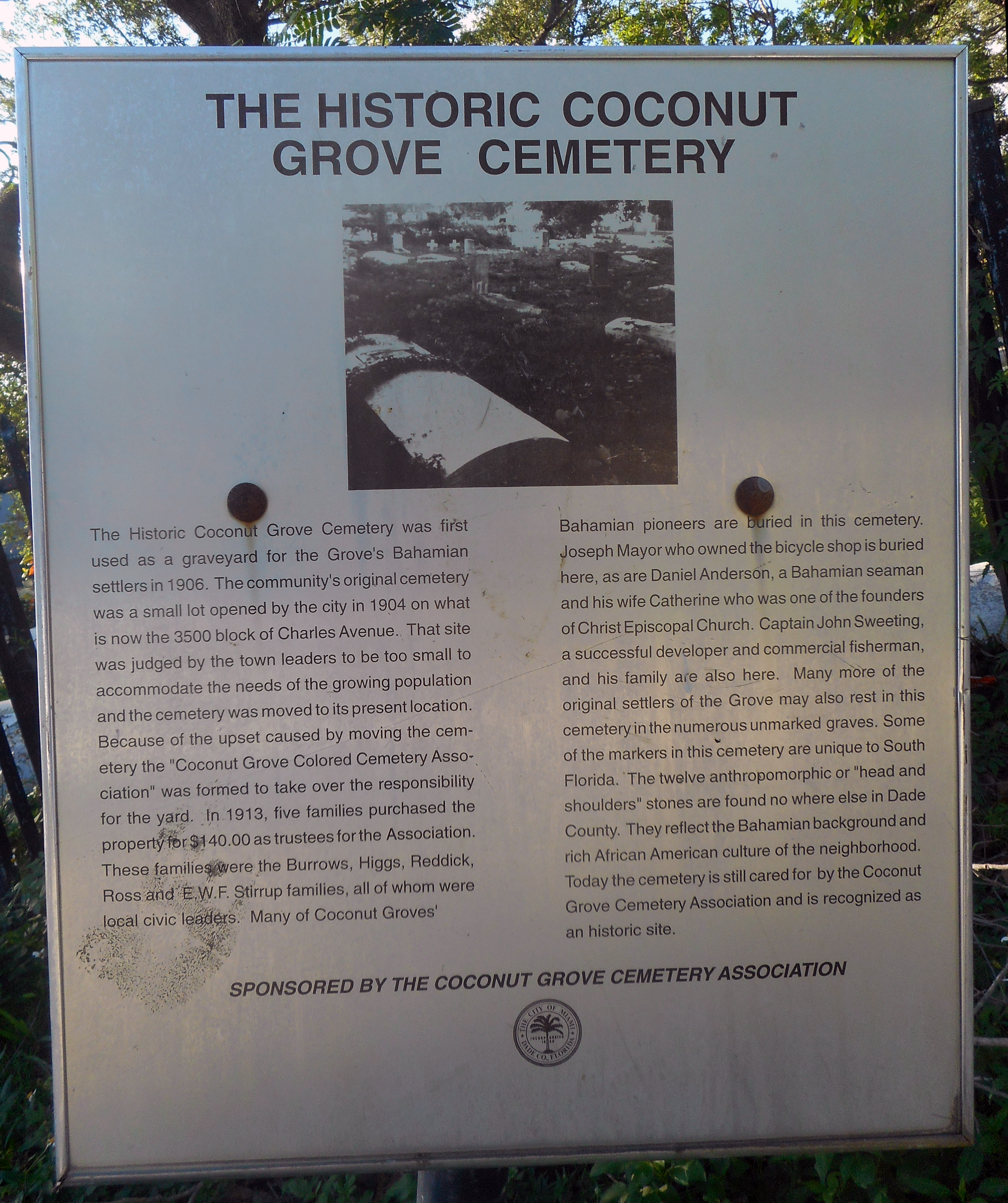
Memorial plaque

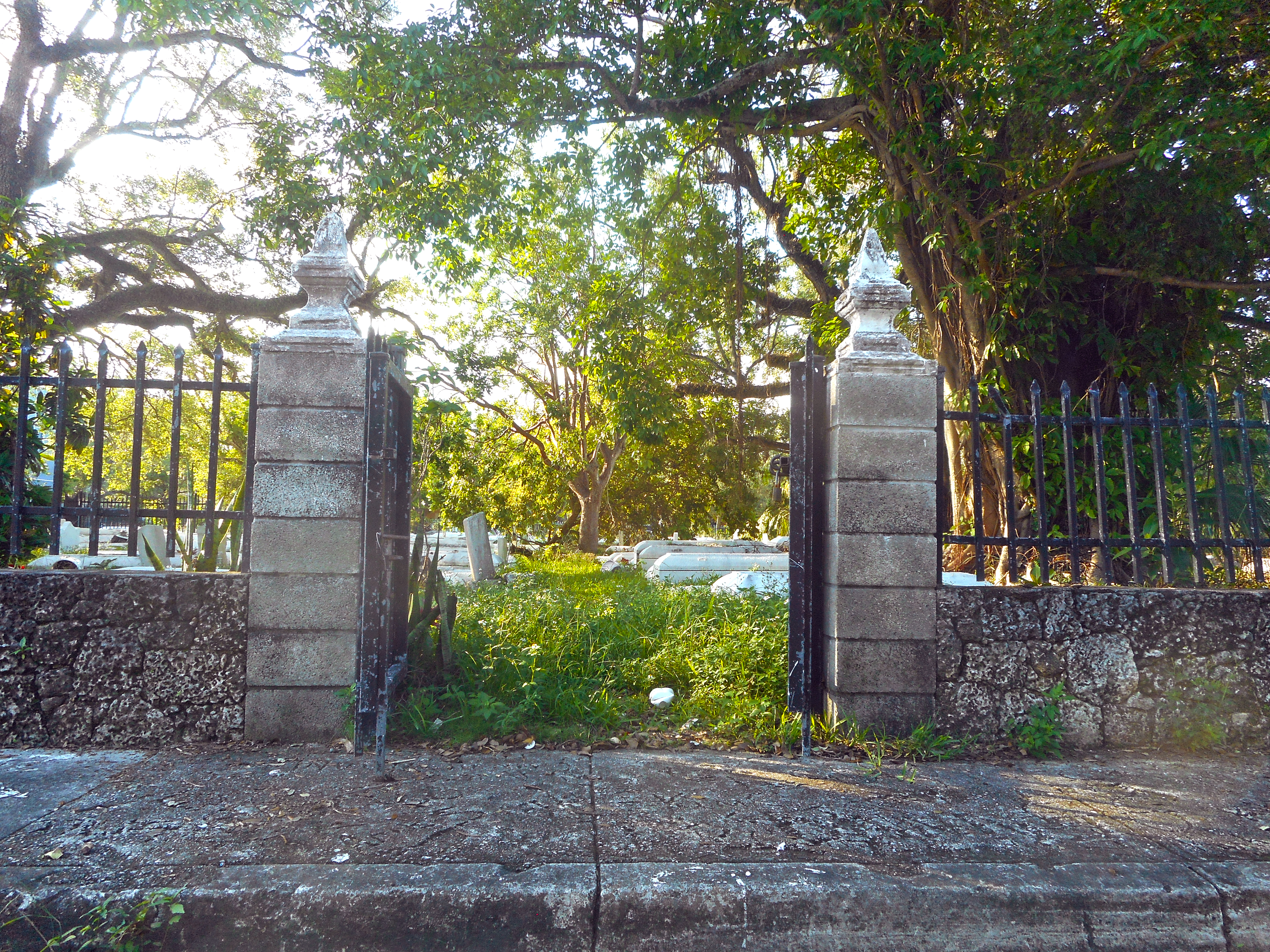
Northeast side entrance gate

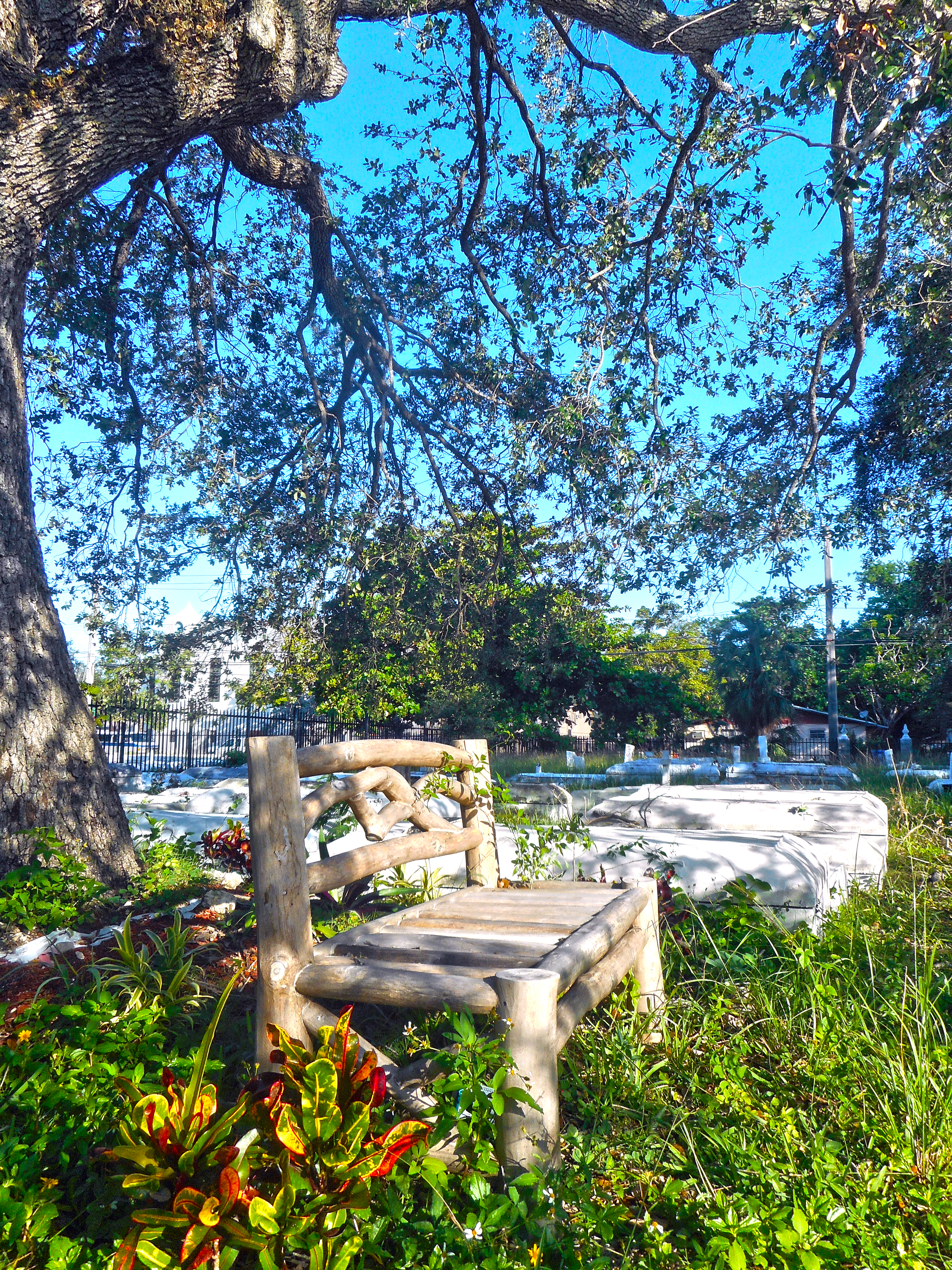
Bench with tree and coffins

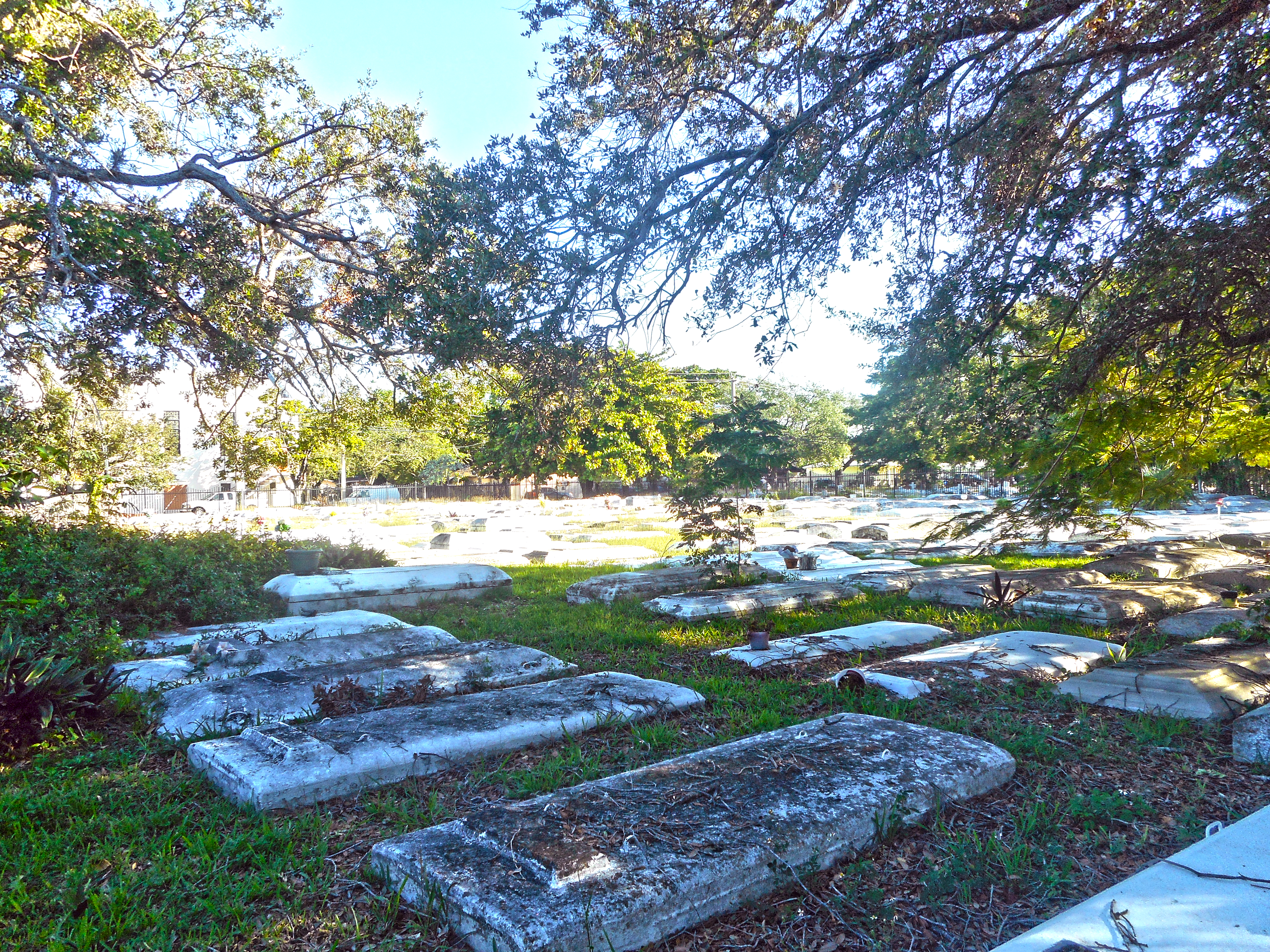
Coffins

== See also ==
- Cemeteries In Florida
