= St. Peter Claver Catholic School (Tampa) =

St Peter Claver Catholic School

Location
- 1401 N Governor St; Tampa, Florida 33602; United States
- Coordinates: 27°57′23.5″N 82°27′13″W

Information
- Type: Private
- Religious affiliation: Catholic
- Established: 1894; 132 years ago
- Local authority: Diocese of St. Petersburg
- Principal: John L. Davidson
- Grades: PreK–8
- Gender: Coeducational
- Enrollment: 210
- Mascot: Lions
- Nickname: SPCCS
- Affiliation: National Catholic Educational Association
- NCES School ID: 00258796
- Website: www.stpeterclavercatholicschool.org

St. Peter Claver Catholic School is a Catholic school in Tampa, Florida. It was established in 1894 to educate African Americans and is the oldest-surviving historically Black primary school in the state.

== History ==
St Peter Claver School was founded in February 1894 by the Society of Jesus (the Jesuits) as a school for African Americans, associated with nearby Sacred Heart Church. The first teachers were from the Sisters of the Holy Names of Jesus and Mary.

Anthony A. Kell was the church's pastor.

The original school building was burned down in an act of racist arson just 10 days after classes began. A notice in the local news the next day read:

“This inscription is posted in this place to say that the late fire on these grounds was not caused by any ill feeling to the Catholic Church, but because the citizens do not propose to submit to a negro school in the midst of the white and retired resident portion of the city; and warn that in case another institution of the same character is operated in this vicinity it too will meet the same or worse fate; and to persist in the same line will certainly cause destruction of the convent and your other Churches.”

The Jesuits reopened the school, at the request of Bishop John Moore, in the Black neighborhood nearby and classes resumed in October 1894. A new building came in 1929, and an annex was added in the early 1950s.

=== Present day ===
The school now serves PreK through 8th grade, and hired John L. Davidson as principal in June 2024.
