= Jenkins House (West Palm Beach, Florida) =

Historic house

The Jenkins House, at 815 Palm Beach Lakes Boulevard, West Palm Beach, Florida, was built in 1946 and was the home of pharmacist Joseph Wiley Jenkins and his family. The city of West Palm Beach acquired it in 1966. It 1989 it became the Artists Showcase of the Palm Beaches, a venue, according to its web site, "to showcase multicultural artists of color and their talents".
