= Old Pleasant City Elementary School =

Former elementary school in West Palm Beach, Florida

The Pleasant City Elementary School was an elementary school for black children in Pleasant City, a neighborhood in West Palm Beach, Florida. Built in 1914 and designed by Hazel Augustus. It was one of the only two black schools in West Palm Beach. It was purchased by the school board in 1926, then sold to the city in the 1960s to become the Pleasant City Community Multicultural Center.
