= Hawthorne Historical Museum and Cultural Center =

Hawthorne Historical Museum & Cultural Center
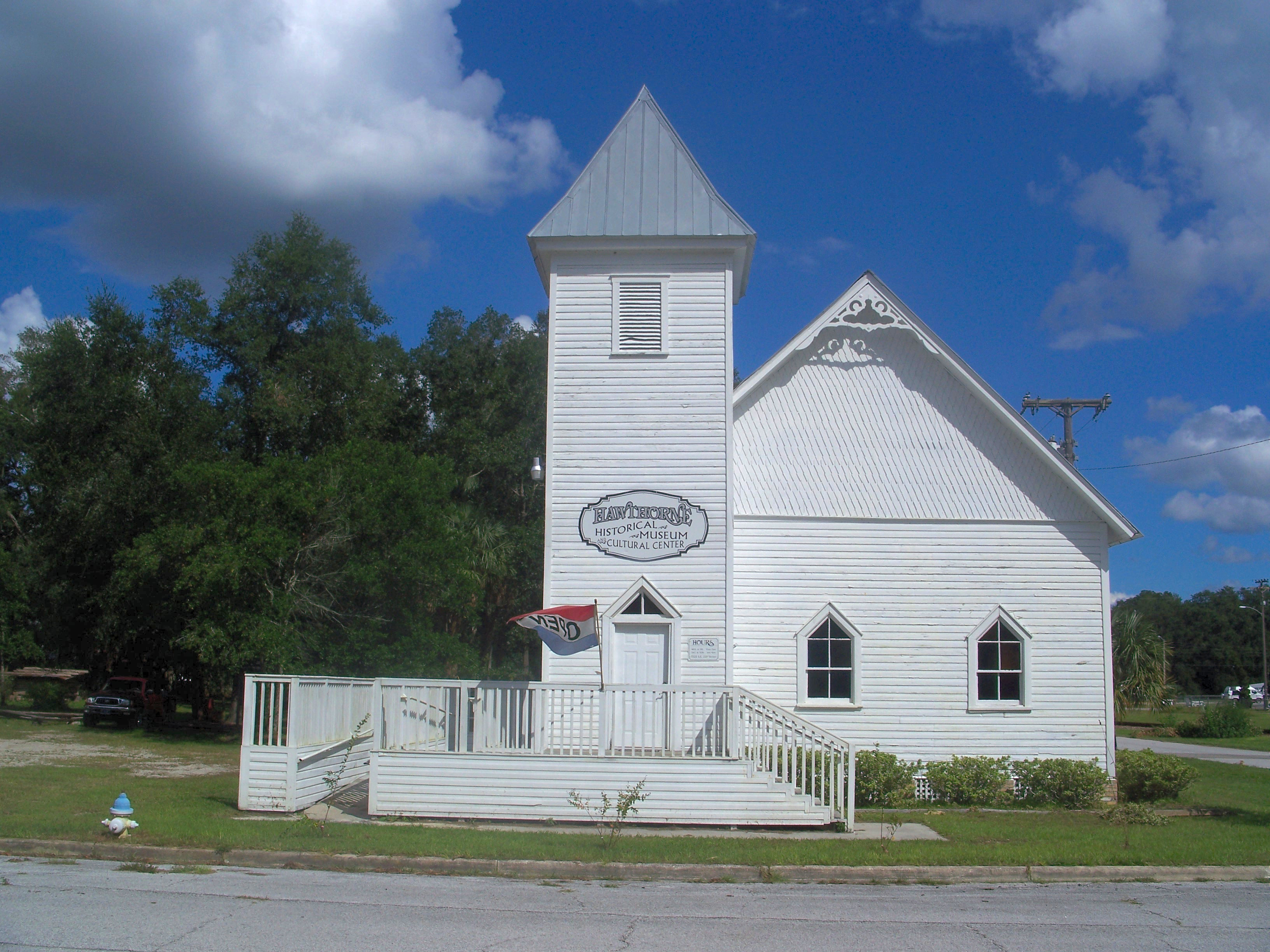

- Location within Florida
- Established: 2002
- Location: 7225 SE 221 Street; Hawthorne, Florida
- Coordinates: 29.58771°N 82.08658°W
- Type: History museum
- Director: Bonita Dewiliby Moore
- Website: Hawthorne Historical Museum & Cultural Center

The Hawthorne Historical Museum & Cultural Center is located at 7225 Southeast 221st Street, Hawthorne, Florida. It contains exhibits depicting the history of Hawthorne especially those military related. Within the building are many military grade vehicles including a tank. The building itself, constructed in 1907, was originally an African-American church.
