= Johnson Chapel Missionary Baptist Church =

Historic church in Florida, United States

- U.S. National Register of Historic Places
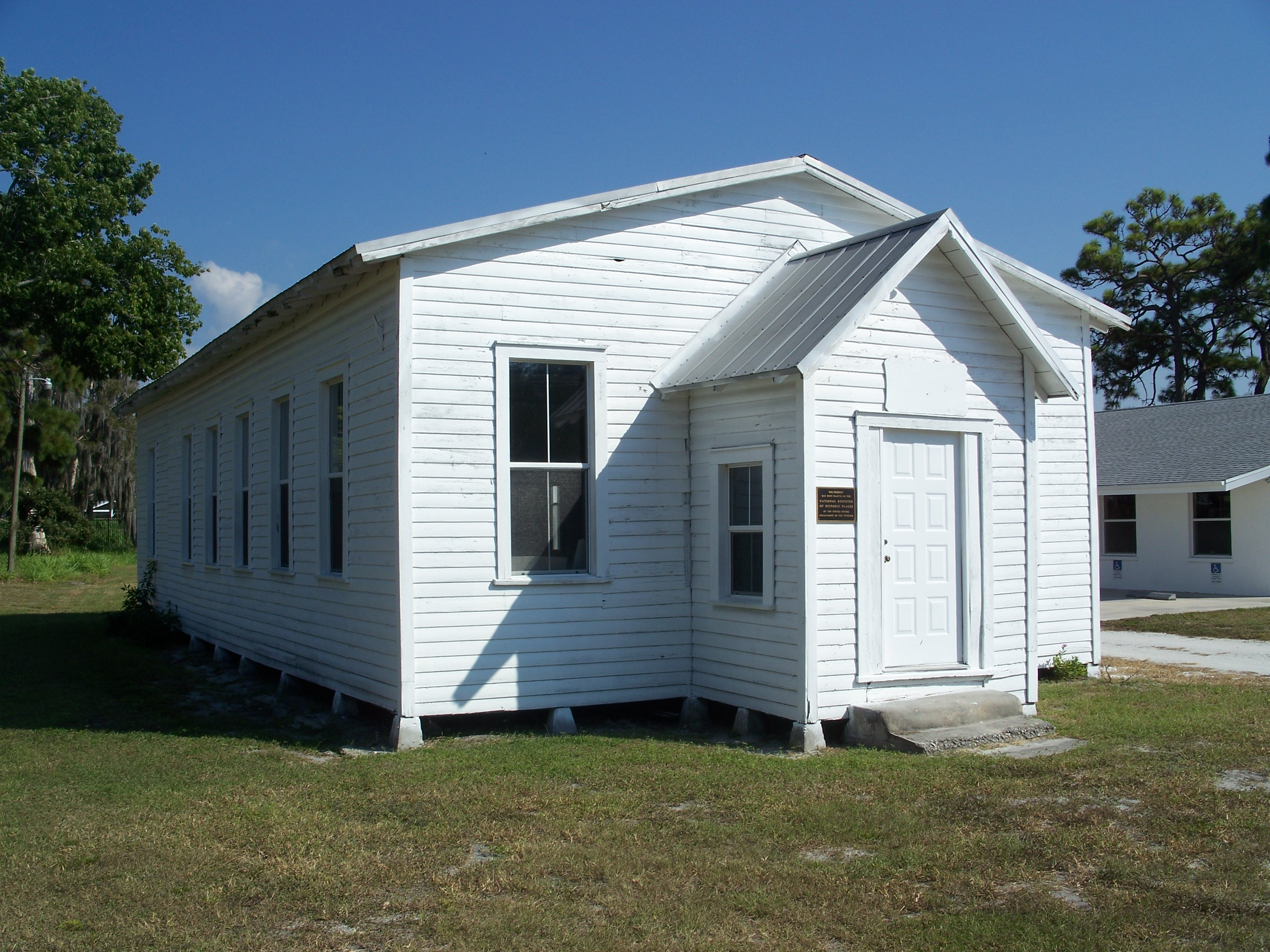

- Location within Florida Location within the United States
- Location: Laurel, Florida
- Coordinates: 27°7′49″N 82°26′54″W
- NRHP reference No.: 97001218
- Added to NRHP: October 8, 1997

The Johnson Chapel Missionary Baptist Church (also known as the Osprey Baptist Church) is a historic church in Laurel, Florida. It is located at 506 Church Street. On October 8, 1997, it was added to the U.S. National Register of Historic Places.
