= Robert Gabriel =

State legislator representing Monroe County, Florida

Robert Gabriel was a state legislator representing Monroe County, Florida. He lived in the neighborhood of Bahama Village in Key West, Florida.

He served in the Florida House of Representatives in 1879 and served several years as Key West City Commissioner.
