= North Franklin Street Historic District =

Historic district in Florida, United States

- U.S. National Register of Historic Places
- U.S. Historic district
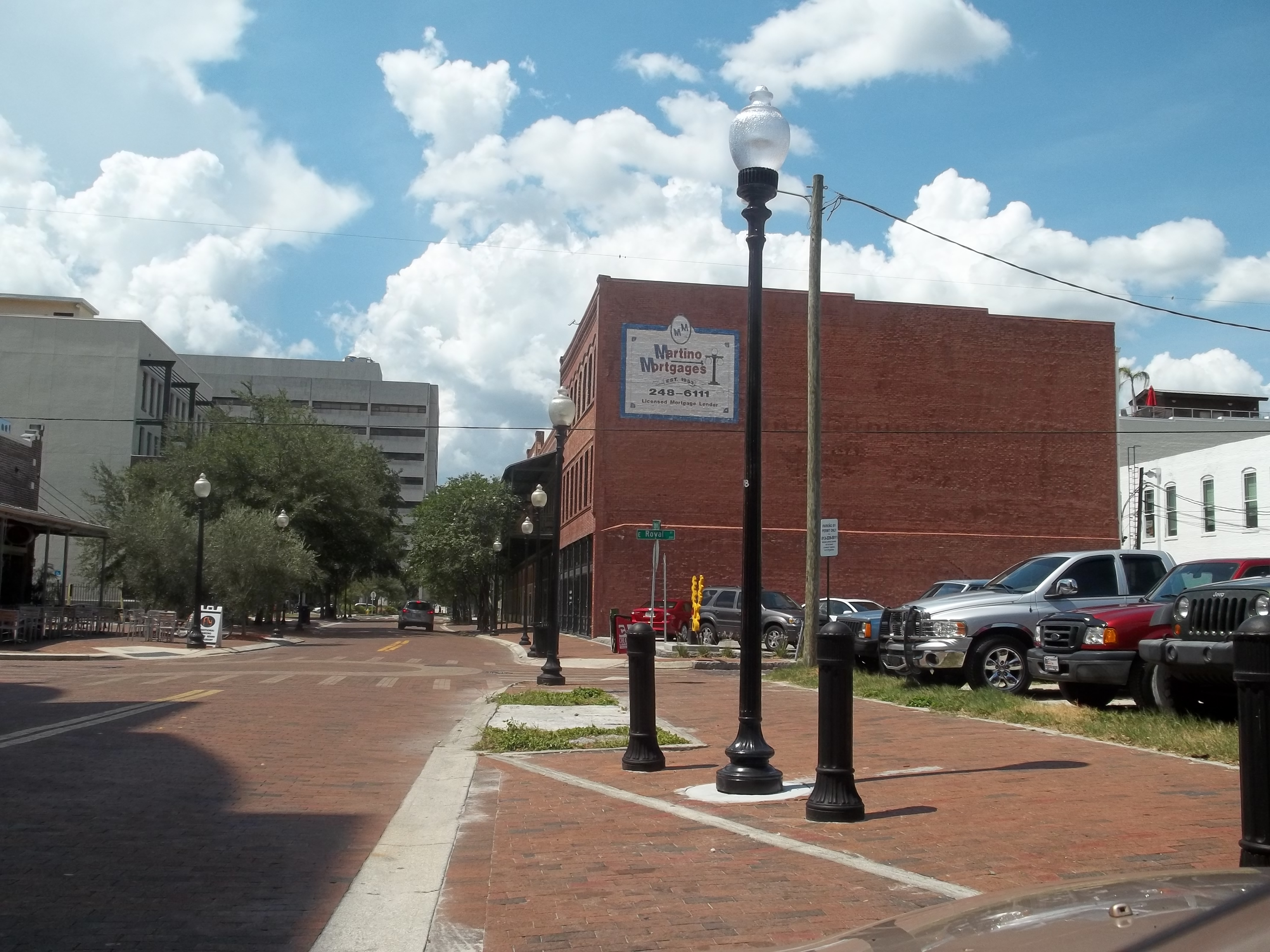

- Location within Florida Location within the United States
- Location: Roughly bounded by Florida Ave., E. Fortune, Tampa, Franklin and E. Harrison Sts., Tampa, Florida
- Coordinates: 27°57′15″N 82°27′37″W
- Area: 3 acres (1.2 ha)
- NRHP reference No.: 02000264
- Added to NRHP: March 28, 2002

The North Franklin Street Historic District is a U.S. historic district (designated as such on March 28, 2002) located in Tampa, Florida. The district is bounded by Florida Avenue, East Fortune, Tampa, Franklin and East Harrison Streets. It contains 8 historic buildings.
