= Collier County Museums =

External image
- Museum of the Everglades

The Collier County Museums represents five museums within Collier County, Florida, United States. Each museum presents information on the history, heritage, culture and evolution of life and ecology in the Everglades.

The Museum of the Everglades is located in the village of "Everglades City" and is a facility to learn about life in the local community. One museum is housed in a national historic landmark known as Everglades Laundry.

The museums were established in 1978, and display the people, places, and events that mark the area's history. The museums offers five separate facilities, each providing a differing view of the area's past, covering both history and legends, and featuring the beaches, cypress forests, and grasslands of the Florida Everglades. The displays include subjects such as saber-toothed cats and ancient civilizations, archaeological discoveries, inventions, trading posts, and cattle ranches.
