= Tookes House =

Historic house in Florida, United States

- U.S. National Register of Historic Places
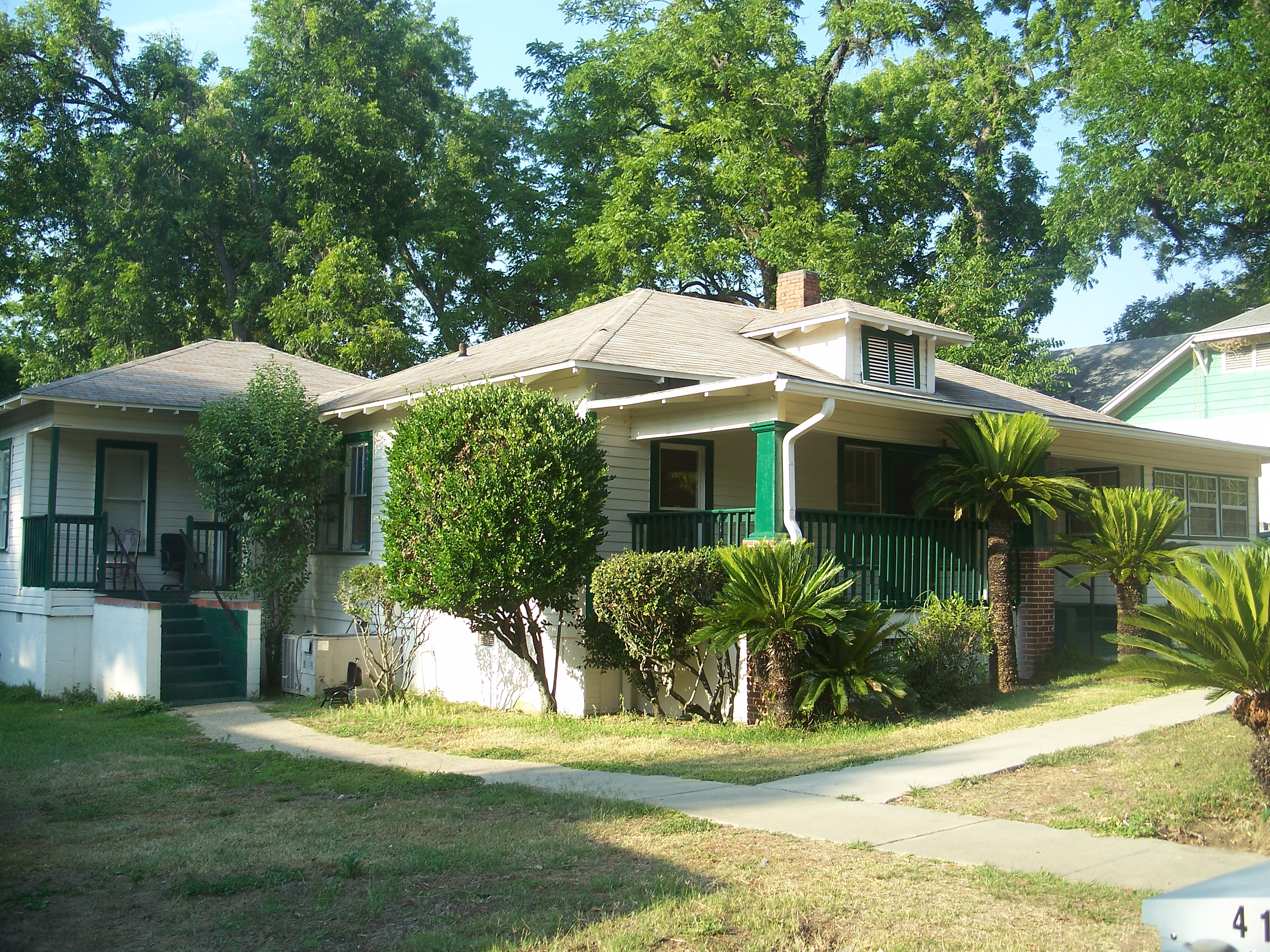

- Location within Florida Location within the United States
- Location: Tallahassee, Florida, USA
- Coordinates: 30°26′44″N 84°17′11″W
- NRHP reference No.: 01000004
- Added to NRHP: January 26, 2001

The Tookes House (also known as the Tookes Hotel) is a historic 11 bedroom home in Tallahassee, Florida, United States. It is located at 412 West Virginia Street. On January 26, 2001, it was added to the U.S. National Register of Historic Places.

The Tookes Hotel (also referred to as Tookes Villa) was founded in 1948 by Dorothy Nash Tookes to accommodate black visitors to Tallahassee who could not seek lodging at other segregated establishments. Four rooms were added in 1948, two in the early 1950s and three in 1971. Tookes was the first certified teacher in Leon County, founder and first principal of the Bond School.
