= Veterans of Foreign Wars Walter R. Mickens Post 6021 and William Weech American Legion Post 168 =

- U.S. National Register of Historic Places
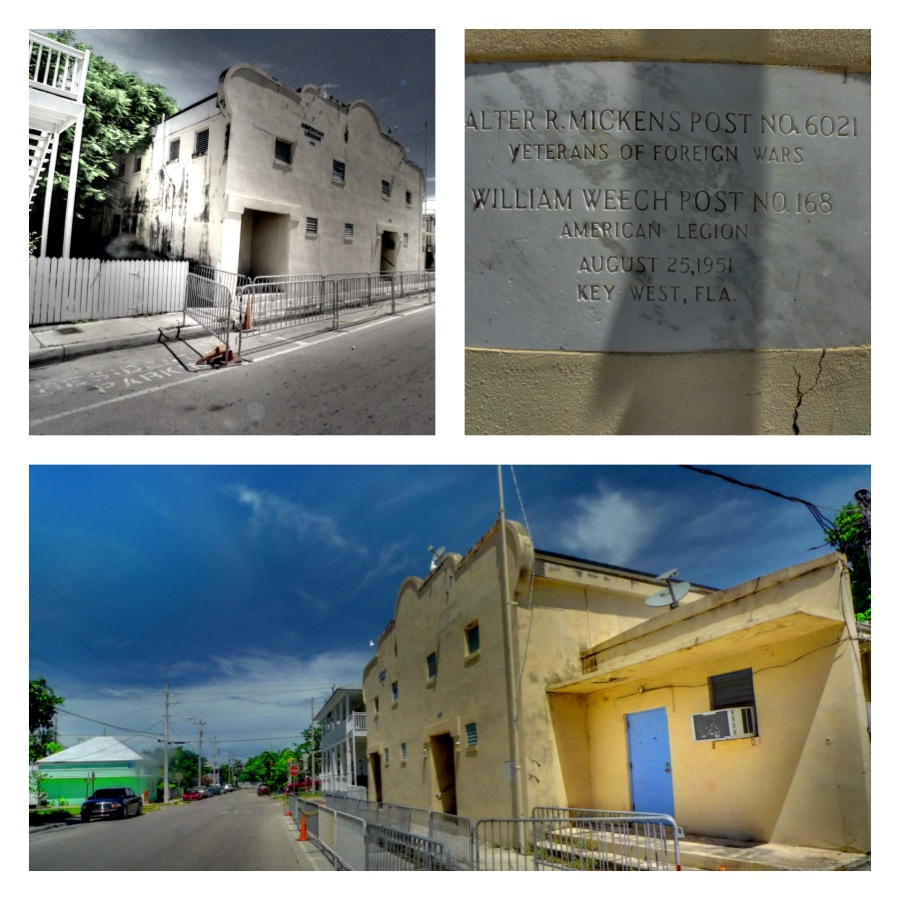

- Location within Florida Location within the United States
- Location: Key West, Florida
- Coordinates: 24.550705°N 81.803609°W
- NRHP reference No.: 12000300
- Added to NRHP: May 30, 2012

The Veterans of Foreign Wars Walter R. Mickens Post 6021 and William Weech American Legion Post 168 is an historic building in Key West, Florida. Ground was broken for it in 1951. It was primarily dedicated to serve black military personnel deployed in the Florida Keys. Some of the entertainers who performed there were Otis Redding and Etta James. On May 30, 2012, it was added to the National Register of Historic Places.
