= Lawrence Silas =

American cattle baron

Lawrence Silas (born 1891) was a cattle baron in Florida. He was African American. Silas has a permanent place in the Florida state museum exhibit "Florida's Black Cowboys: Past and Present".

== History ==
Lawrence was born in Kenansville, Florida, on November 8, 1891, to former Georgia slave Tom Silas and his wife Elizabeth, the sixth of thirteen children. Because it was a rural area, Tom built a school and hired a teacher so his children could receive an education. Upon Tom’s death in 1905, Lawrence, aged fourteen, took over his father’s estate of 160 acres and 6 thousand head of cattle. He grew the heard to over 30 thousand head of cattle that fenced over 50 miles of the Kissimmee valley. Much of that land is where Disney resides today.. From 1911 to 1972 Lawrence purchased land and grew his business.

Lawrence had a knowledge for every kind of sickness a cow could have. He used to sit on a corral gate as a herd ran past and count the passing cattle. At calving time, he could “mammy up” every mother cow with her own calf by the color or curl of the hair or set off a shoulder, no matter how large the herd.

He was featured in the 1942 “Saturday Evening Post” article “Lawrence of the River” by Zora Neale Hurston, and was quoted as saying “I’ll be a cowman as long as I live. I might even die out on the range with a cigar in my mouth. Wouldn’t be nothing wrong with that.” The day he suffered a stroke he had spent the morning herding cattle at his ranch.

Lawrence received honors from Kissimmee High School, cattlemen’s groups, black educators and was recognized by President Harry S. Truman and Eleanor Roosevelt. He once saved a child from drowning in Mill Slough by riding his horse into the water and bringing the child to land.

father, Thomas Silas, was a former slave who worked for various cattlemen after moving from Georgia to Kenansville, Florida. He built a ranch, eventually expanded to span 2,000 acres. The elder Silas died in 1909 when Lawrence was 18 years old. Lawrence, his 12 siblings, and mother saw the family's holdings deteriorate as the elder Silas left no will. The entire family then moved to Kissimmee, and Lawrence Silas began anew, building his own ranch and herd.[1]

While many blacks worked throughout the Florida cattle industry, Silas was demonstrably the most successful. He died in 1974 at the age of 82.

In Kissimmee, Lawrence Silas Boulevard is named after the cattleman.
