= Overtown Historic District =

Historic district in Florida, United States

- U.S. National Register of Historic Places
- U.S. Historic district
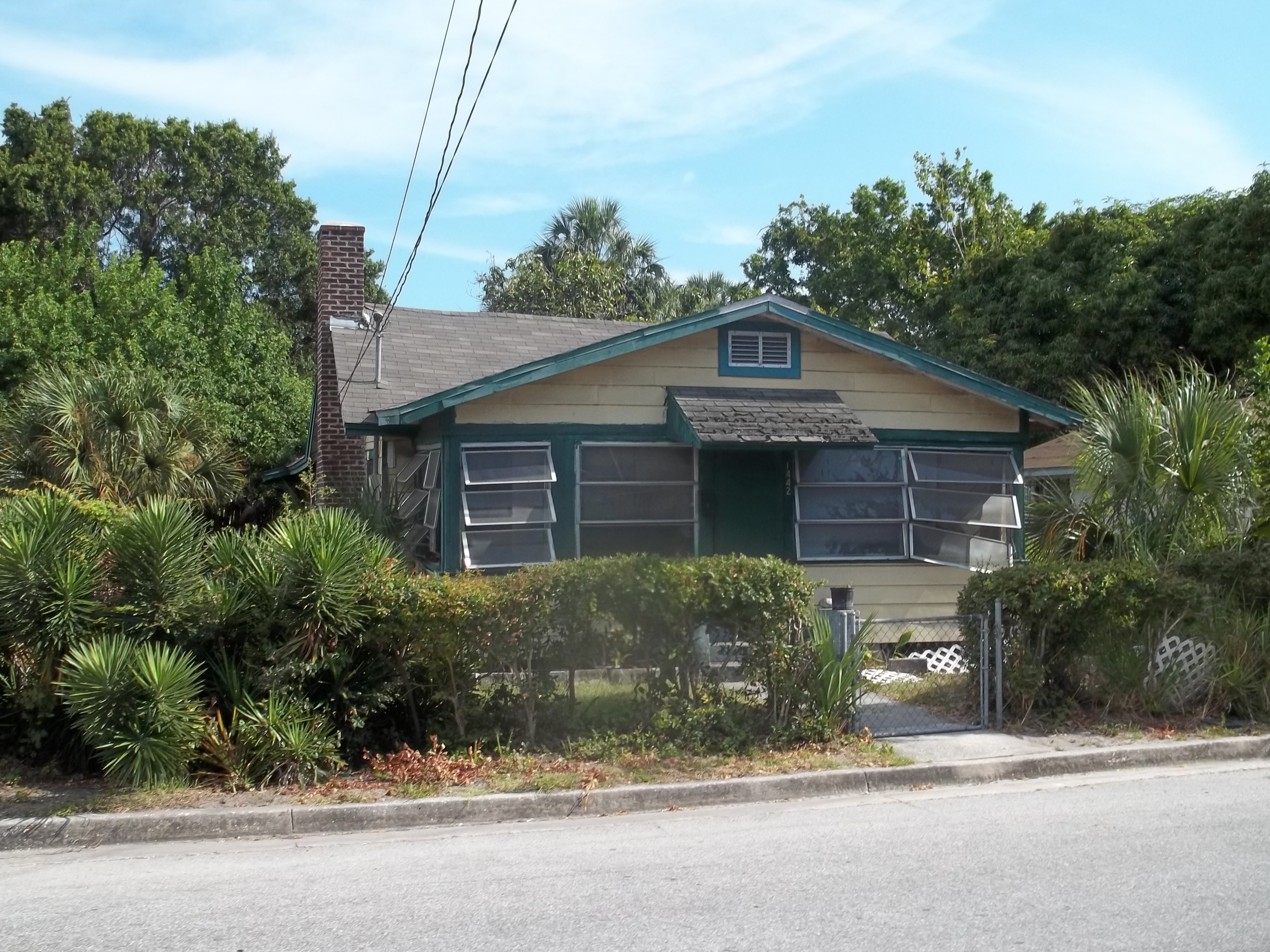

- Location within Florida Location within the United States
- Location: Sarasota, Florida
- Coordinates: 27°22′13″N 82°32′35″W
- Area: 160 acres (0.65 km^{2})
- NRHP reference No.: 02000781
- Added to NRHP: July 19, 2002

The Overtown Historic District (also known as Black Bottom) is a U.S. historic district (designated as such on July 19, 2002) located in Sarasota, Florida. The district runs roughly along Central and Cohen Avenues, between 9th and 4th Streets. It contains 25 historic buildings.
