= Shady Grove Primitive Baptist Church =

Historic church in Florida, United States

- U.S. National Register of Historic Places
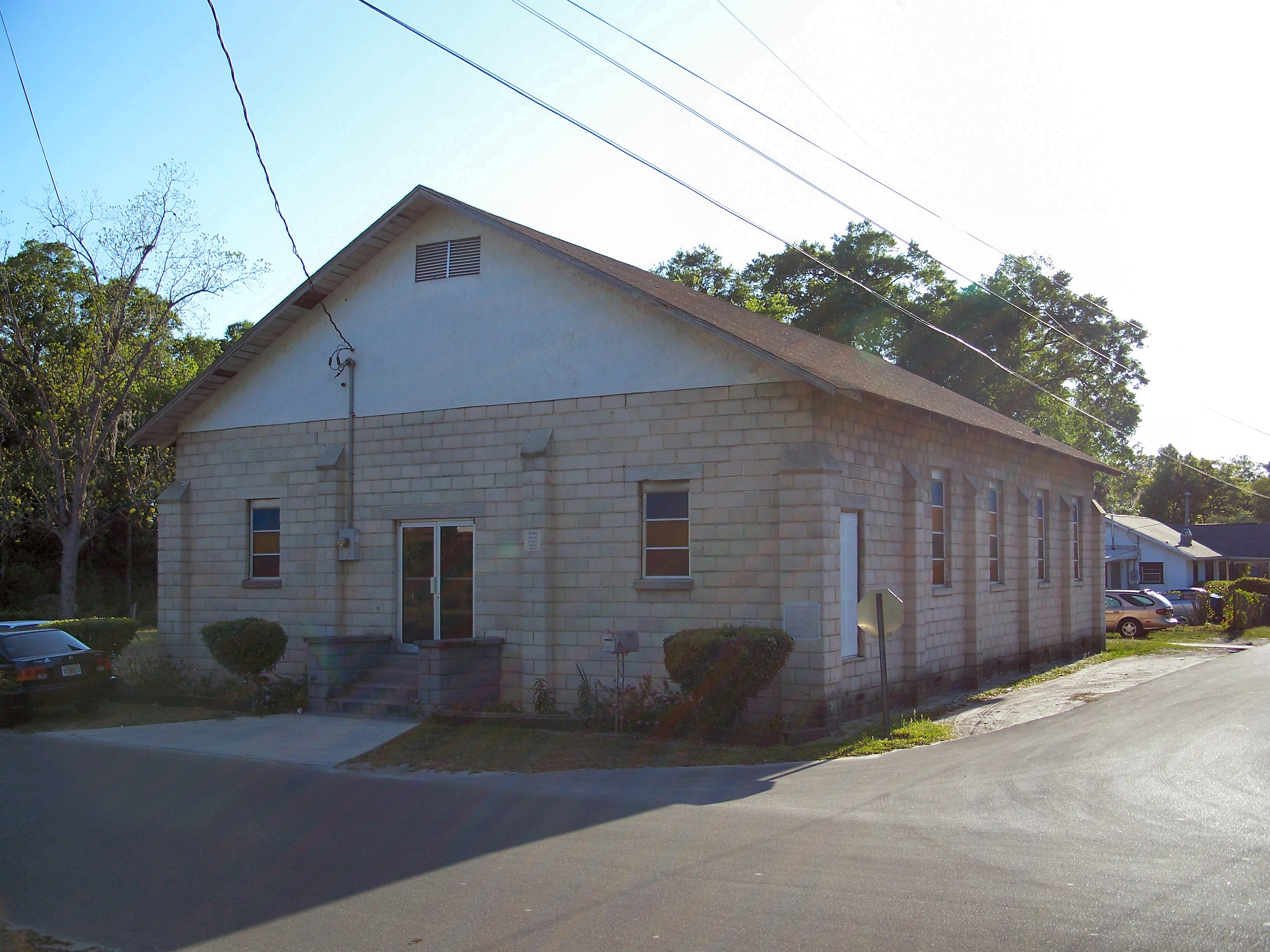

- Location within Florida Location within the United States
- Location: Gainesville, Florida
- Coordinates: 29°38′47″N 82°19′47″W
- Built: 1935
- NRHP reference No.: 05001115
- Added to NRHP: October 5, 2005

The Shady Grove Primitive Baptist Church is a historic U.S. church in Gainesville, Florida. It is located at 804 Southwest Fifth Street. On October 5, 2005, it was added to the U.S. National Register of Historic Places.
