= Pleasant Street Historic District (Gainesville, Florida) =

Historic district in Florida, United States

- U.S. National Register of Historic Places
- U.S. Historic district
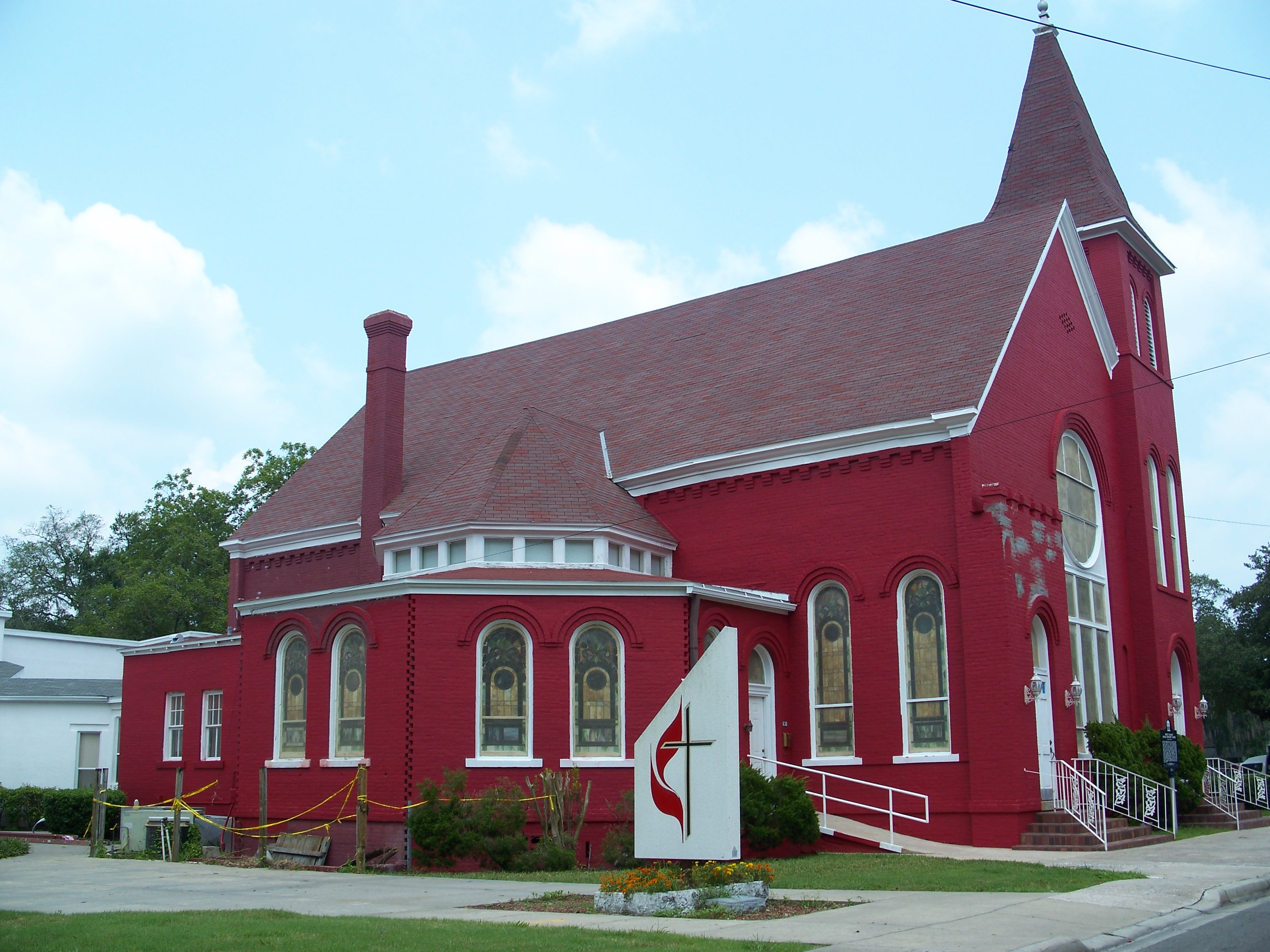
- Mount Pleasant United Methodist Church, in the district

- Location within Florida Location within the United States
- Location: Gainesville, Florida
- Coordinates: 29°39′21″N 82°19′43″W
- Area: 770 acres (3.1 km^{2})
- NRHP reference No.: 89000323
- Added to NRHP: April 20, 1989

The Pleasant Street Historic District in Gainesville, Florida is a U.S. historic district (designated as such on April 20, 1989) located in Gainesville, Florida. It encompasses approximately 770 acres (3.1 km^{2}), bounded by Northwest 8th Avenue, Northwest 1st Street, Northwest 2nd Avenue, and Northwest 6th Street. It contains 259 historic buildings.

== History ==
Pleasant Street is one of Gainesville's early African American settlements, along with Porter's Quarters.
