= Lake Wire =

- Location within Florida
- Location: south of Lakeland, Florida
- Coordinates: 28.0468°N 81.9608°W
- Type: natural freshwater lake
- Basin countries: United States
- Max. length: 1,255 feet (383 m)
- Max. width: 1,220 feet (370 m)
- Surface area: 22.17 acres (9 ha)
- Average depth: 10.8 feet (3.3 m)
- Max. depth: 22 feet (6.7 m)
- Water volume: 80,120,478 US gallons (303,289,000 L)
- Surface elevation: 196 feet (60 m)

Lake Wire, an almost-round lake, has a surface area of 22.17 acres (89,700 m^{2}). This lake is inside Lakeland, Florida, and the area surrounding it is completely urbanized. The lake was probably once oval shaped, but it appears it was partially filled on the southwest and northwest sides to allow parts of Lake Wire Drive to be built. It is almost completely surrounded by Lake Wire Drive, except for a distance of about 100 feet (30 m) on the northeast. The lake is completely surrounded by a public sidewalk.

Lake Wire provides public access along its entire shore, via the sidewalk that surrounds it. The public is allowed to access the shore daily from dawn to dusk. There are no boat ramps or swimming areas along the lake shore, but it can be fished from the shore. The Take Me Fishing website says Lake Wire contains largemouth bass and bluegill.

Lake Wire was so named for the fact the lake contained poles carrying telegraph wires.
