= Lewis Mausoleum =

Historic site in Duval County, Florida

- U.S. National Register of Historic Places
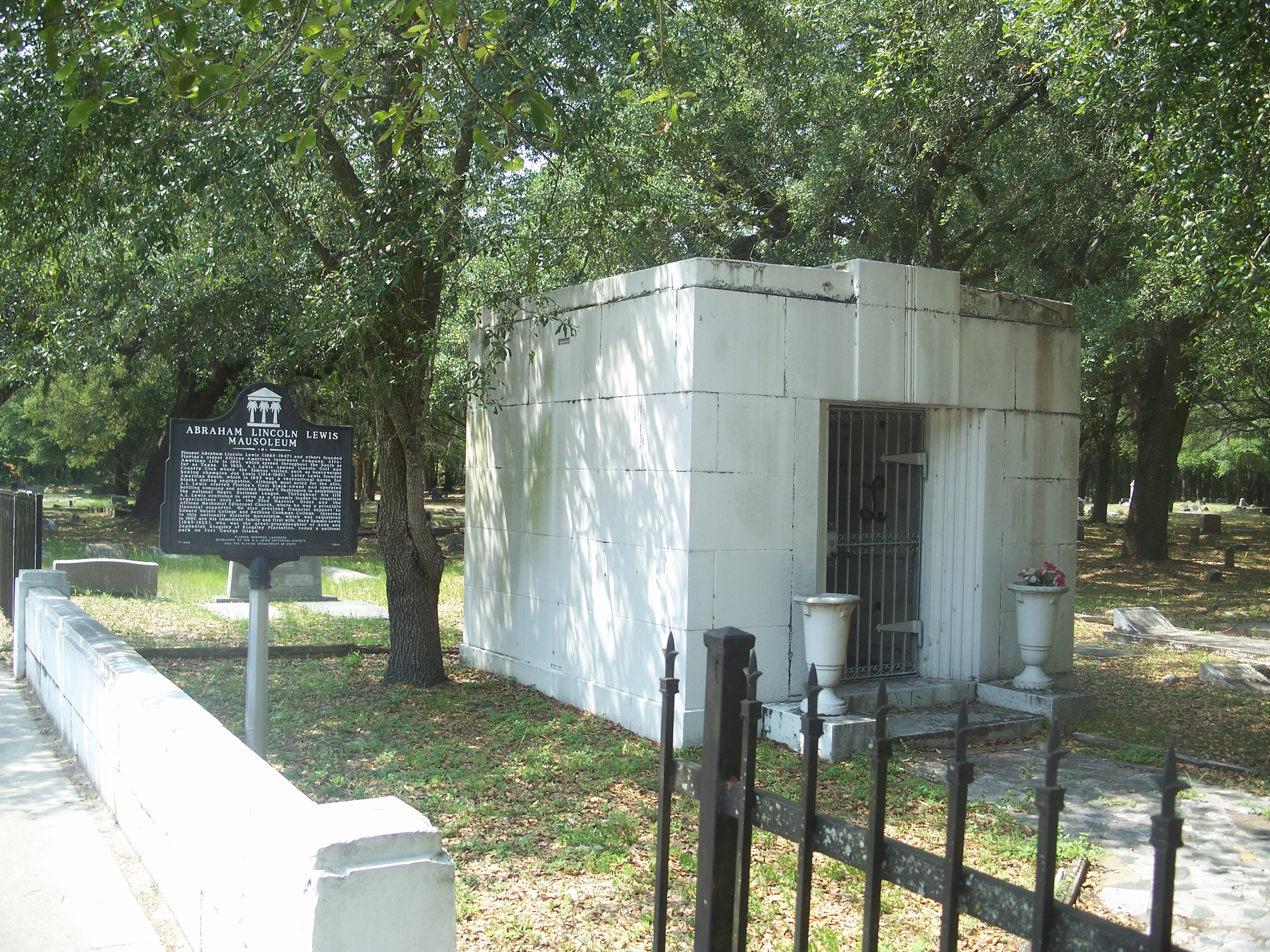

- Location within Florida Location within the United States
- Location: Jacksonville, Florida, USA
- Coordinates: 30°22′52″N 81°41′47″W
- NRHP reference No.: 97001225
- Added to NRHP: October 24, 1997

The Lewis Mausoleum is a historic mausoleum in Jacksonville, Florida. It is located in Memorial Cemetery, at the junction of Edgewood Avenue and Moncreif Road. On October 24, 1997, it was added to the U.S. National Register of Historic Places.

The mausoleum is the resting place of Abraham Lincoln Lewis (1865-1947), a Florida pioneer and prominent businessman in the African-American community. Lewis was co-founder of Afro-American Life, an early provider of insurance services to African-Americans. He also responded to segregation by opening a country club, a golf course and an oceanfront recreational area that welcomed a non-white clientele. He assisted Booker T. Washington in the creation of the national Negro Business League, and supported historically black colleges. He is interred with his first wife, Mary Sammis Lewis (1865–1923).
