= West Ocala Historic District =

Historic district in Florida, United States

- U.S. National Register of Historic Places
- U.S. Historic district
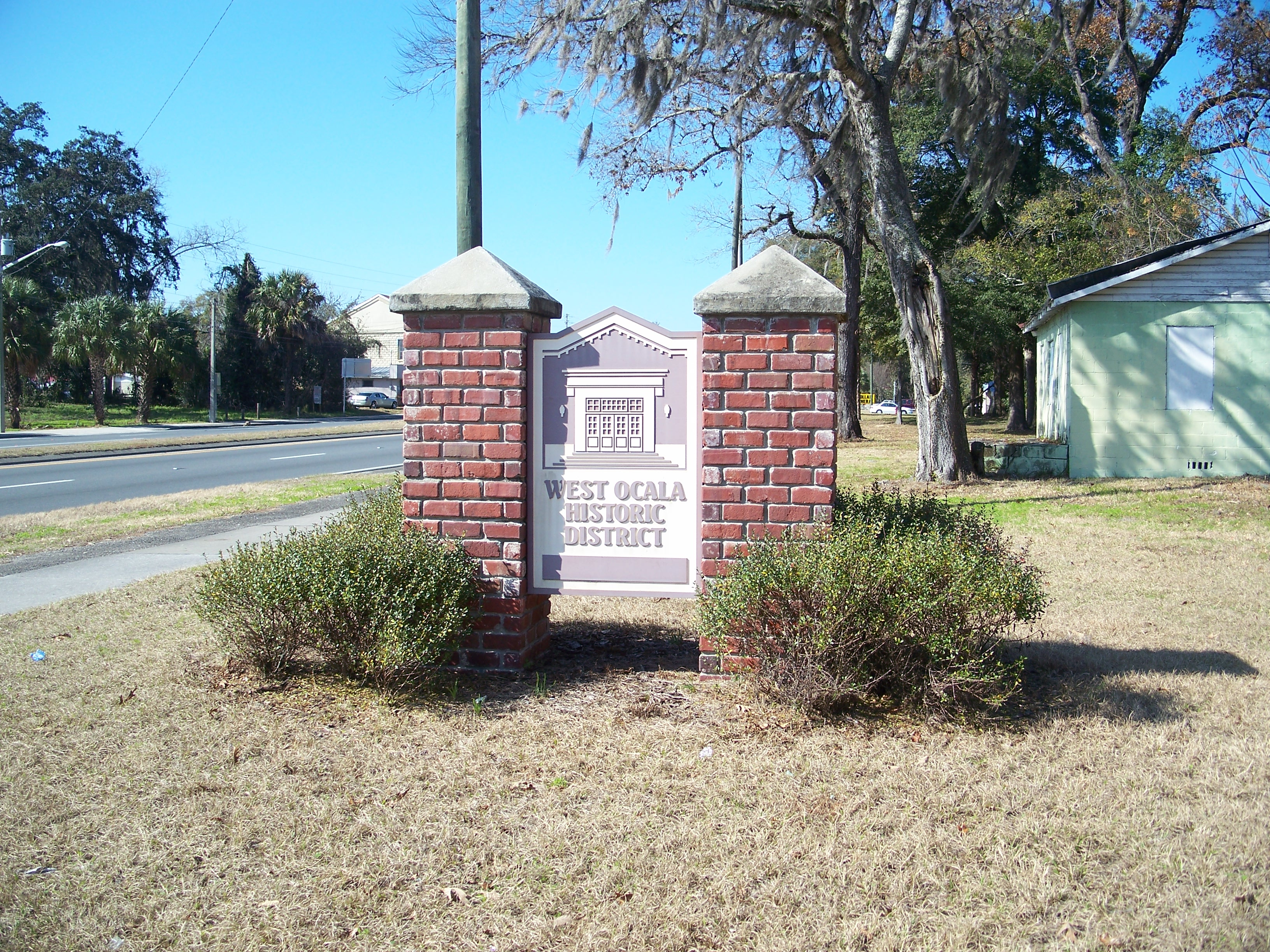

- Location within Florida Location within the United States
- Location: Ocala, Marion County
- Coordinates: 29°11′17″N 82°8′47″W
- Area: 35 acres (140,000 m^{2})
- NRHP reference No.: 02000682
- Added to NRHP: June 27, 2002

The West Ocala Historic District is a historic district in Ocala, Florida. It is roughly bounded by Northwest 4th Street, West Silver Springs Boulevard, and Northwest 12th Avenue, encompasses approximately 350 acres (1.4 km^{2}), and contains 104 historic buildings. On June 27, 2002, it was added to the U.S. National Register of Historic Places.
