= Colgate =

Colgate may refer to:

== Places ==
- Colgate, North Dakota, US
- Colgate, Wisconsin, US
- Colgate, West Sussex, England, UK
- Colgate, Saskatchewan, Canada

== Other ==
- Colgate (name)
- Colgate (toothpaste), a product of Colgate-Palmolive
- Colgate-Palmolive, a corporation
- The Colgate Comedy Hour, an American musical variety television show sponsored by Colgate-Palmolive
- Colgate Clock (Indiana), an octagonal clock in Clarksville, Indiana
- Colgate Clock (Jersey City), an octagonal clock in Jersey City, New Jersey
- Colgate University, a private liberal arts college in Madison County, New York
- Colgate (pony), a character in My Little Pony

== See also ==
- Coalgate (disambiguation)
- Colgate Clock (disambiguation)
- Colegate
