= Colgate (name) =

Colgate is both a surname and a given name. Notable people with the name include:

== Surname ==
- Gilbert Colgate (1899–1965), American bobsledder
- Pat Colgate, artistic director of the dance company Placer Theatre Ballet
- Stirling Colgate (1925–2013), American physicist
- William Colgate (1783–1857), American manufacturer, founder of what would become the Colgate Toothpaste Company
  - James Boorman Colgate (1818–1904), American financier
  - Samuel Colgate (1822–1897), American manufacturer and philanthropist
    - Samuel Colgate Jr. (1868–1902), American football coach
- Steve Colgate (born 1935), American sailor

== Given name ==
- Colgate Darden (1897–1981), American politician
- Colgate Hoyt (1849–1922), American businessman
