= Northwest Historic District =

- U.S. National Register of Historic Places
- U.S. Historic district
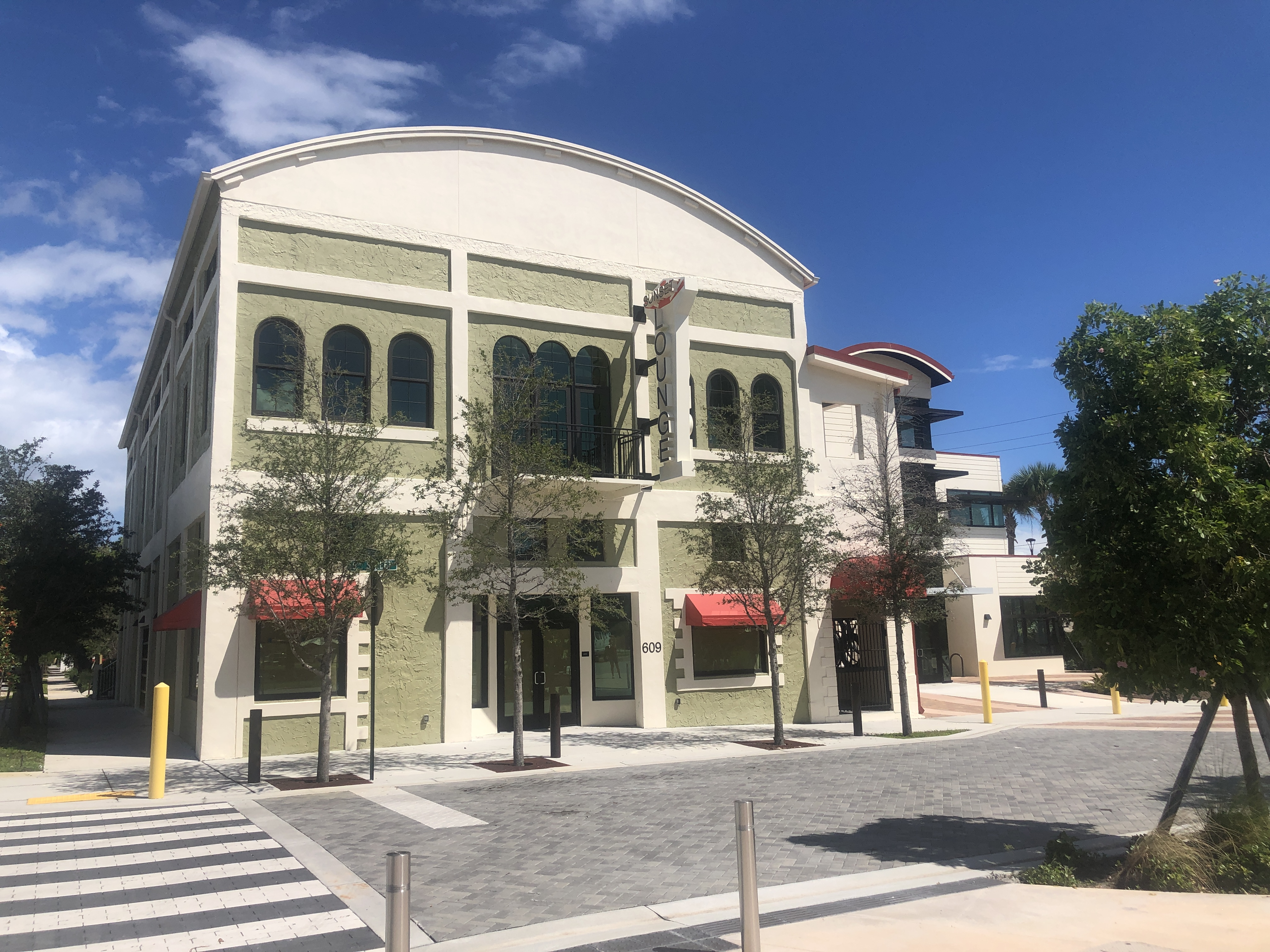
- Sunset Lounge Historic Jazz Club

- Location within Florida Location within the United States
- Location: West Palm Beach, Florida
- Coordinates: 26°43′06″N 80°03′34″W
- Area: 700 acres (2.8 km^{2})
- NRHP reference No.: 91002005
- Added to NRHP: January 22, 1992

The Northwest Historic District is a U.S. historic district in West Palm Beach, Florida on the northwestern side of the downtown area. It was designated a historic district on January 22, 1992. Its first Non-Native American settlements date back to the late 19th Century. After Henry Flagler announced plans to extend the Florida East Coast Railway to Southeastern Florida, blacks from northern Florida, Georgia, and the Bahamas moved to this area in search of work. West Palm Beach became incorporated in 1894, making it the oldest municipality in Palm Beach County.

For many decades, the Northwest neighborhood hosted the local segregated black community that prospered and added their own identity and culture to the city.

The district is bounded by Tamarind Avenue, 11th Street, Rosemary Avenue, and 3rd Street. It contains 316 historic buildings, including churches and houses that represent a variety of styles from the late 19th- and early 20th- century in the South like the Bungalow Craftsman style, the Bahamian Vernacular style, the Shotgun, and American Foursquare style.

The West Palm Beach Community Development Agency has targeted the area, and is restructuring Tamarind Avenue and 7th Streets. They are also restoring the Sunset Lounge, called the "Cotton Club of the South", one of the few remaining venues on the Chitlin' Circuit.

== Geography ==
According to the National Register of Historic Places (NRHP)'s definition, the Northwest Historic District is bounded by 2nd Street, 11th Street, Rosemary Avenue, and Tamarind Avenue in West Palm Beach, Florida. (Note: Although the National Register of Historic Places registration form describes the Northwest Historic District as "roughly bordered by Tamarind Avenue, Eleventh Street, Rosemary Avenue, and Third Street," the document also lists contributing and non-contributing structures on Second Street.) Overall, the size of this area is roughly 70 acres (28 ha). The city of West Palm Beach defines the district differently, sometimes inverting the boundaries east of Tamarind Avenue and west of Rosemary Avenue, while the north end is located along Fifteenth Street. However, for the purpose of the downtown master plan, this section is known as the Northwest Neighborhood District, which includes all areas from Second Street to Palm Beach Lakes Boulevard and between the CSX Transportation and Florida East Coast railways.

== History ==
In 1894, the year that West Palm Beach, Florida, was incorporated as a town, African Americans began being forced out of the Styx, a section of Palm Beach. African Americans began settling in the Northwest Historic District that year. Initially an area west of the Florida East Coast Railway (FEC) that stretched to around First Street (now known as Banyan Street) and Tamarind Avenue, the area soon extended to as far south as Evernia Street and north to Fifth Avenue (present-day Seventh Avenue). Industrial High School opened on Eleventh Street in 1917, at the time the only secondary education facility in the county for African Americans. U. B. Kinsey/Palmview Elementary School of the Arts stands there today.

During the 1928 Okeechobee hurricane, a few churches in the Northwest Historic District suffered significant damage. Tabernacle Missionary Baptist Church lost many bricks on its front facade and much of the metal grillwork around the entrances, while the building itself was deroofed. Payne Chapel AME Church, then located at Banyan Boulevard and Tamarind Avenue, was destroyed by the storm. St. Patrick's Catholic Church received about $40,000 in damage. Due to Jim Crow laws, the Northwest Historic District and Pleasant City served as the segregated neighborhoods for African Americans, with a 1929 ordinance officially defining their boundaries. According to the ordinance, the former stretched south to the alleyway between Clematis Street and First Street, north to Twenty-third Street, west to Clear Lake, and east to the FEC.

Notable residents of the Northwest Historic District included Gwen Cherry, the first African American today to serve in the Florida Legislature, and Dr. Alice Mickens, whose home is one of the oldest surviving (built in 1917) in West Palm Beach and served as a guest house and meeting places for some African American civil rights leaders. An individual listing on the National Register of Historic Places (NRHP), the Mickens House accommodated guests such as Ralph Bunche, A. Philip Randolph, Mary McLeod Bethune, and Louis Armstrong. Another notable structure is the Sunset Lounge, a Chitlin' Circuit music venue where Armstrong, Count Basie, James Brown, Sam Cooke, and Ella Fitzgerald performed.

A 1951 study by the University of Miami led to additional housing being constructed for African Americans west of the neighborhood in 1957. However, the segregation ordinance was repealed in 1960. On January 22, 1992, the Northwest Historic District was added to the NRHP. About a year later, the city of West Palm Beach listed the neighborhood on its own historic places' registry. Incidents of arson between December 2000 and August 2001 impacted 14 homes in the district, with 11 of those destroyed or damaged beyond repairs. The Palm Beach Post noted that from the 1960s to 2001, fires and code violations led to the demolition of approximately 300 homes, most during the 1990s. In February 2026, a fire that started at 610 Douglass Avenue destroyed three homes. The neighborhood is still predominately African American.

== Architecture ==
Several styles of architecture are represented within the Northwest Historic District, including Bungalow Craftsman, Gothic Revival, Frame Vernacular, Masonry Vernacular, Mission Revival, and Romanesque. Additionally, there are some examples of a subtype of Frame Vernacular structures known as shotgun houses. According to Tulie W. Taylor of the Florida Bureau of Historic Preservation noted that, "the shotgun, a one story rectangular, front gabled frame structure with three to four rooms opening off the hall, is reputed to have received its name from the floor plan which features a hallway running the length of the structure with doors to the exterior on either end." Some of the buildings, including some of the churches, were designed by local firm Harvey and Clarke. Hazel Augustus, West Palm Beach's first African American architect, also designed a few of the churches and some homes.

== Contributing structures ==
The Historic Old Town Commercial District has 316 structures listed as contributing, including:

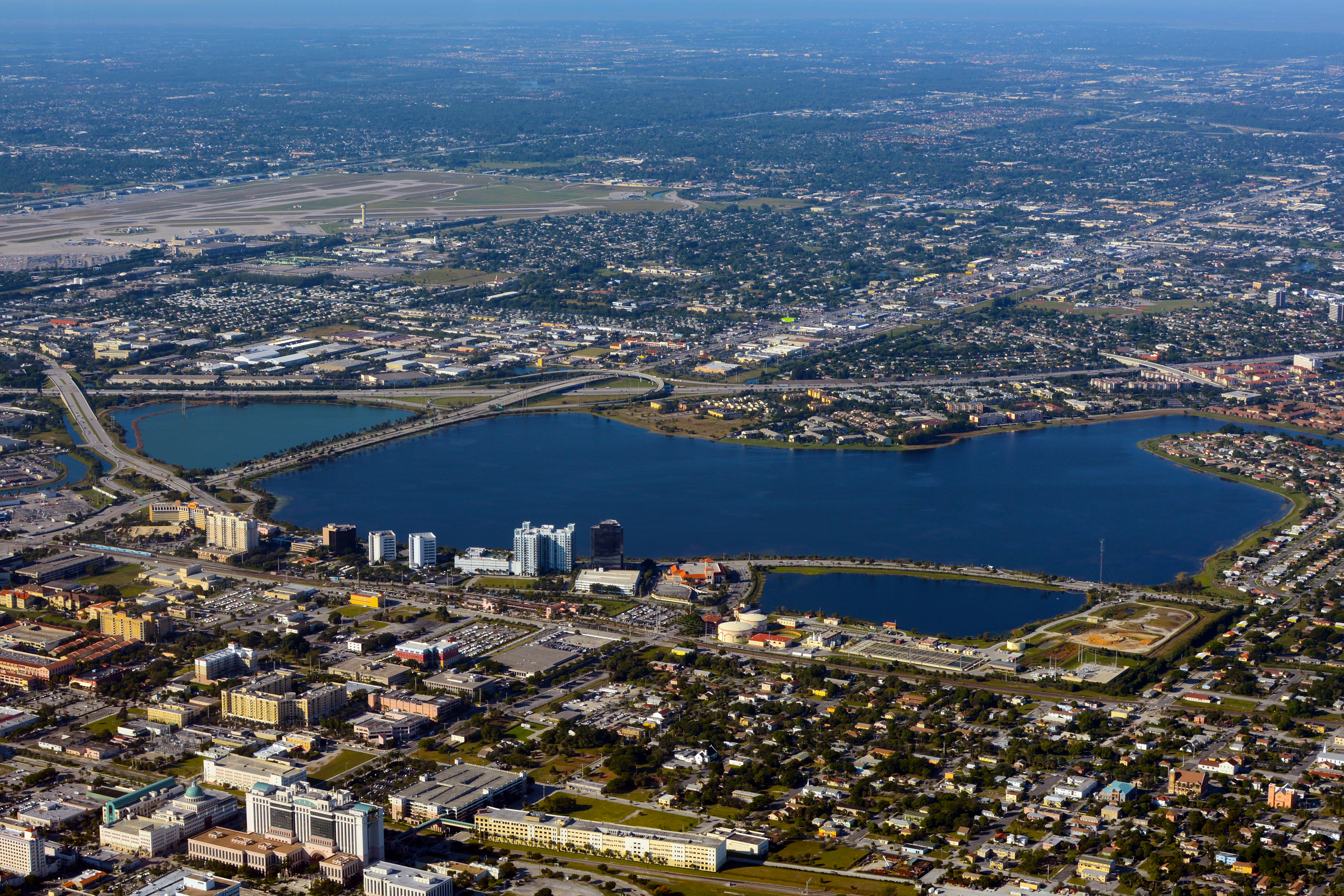
A 2014 aerial view of West Palm Beach. The Northwest Historic District is visible in the bottom right corner

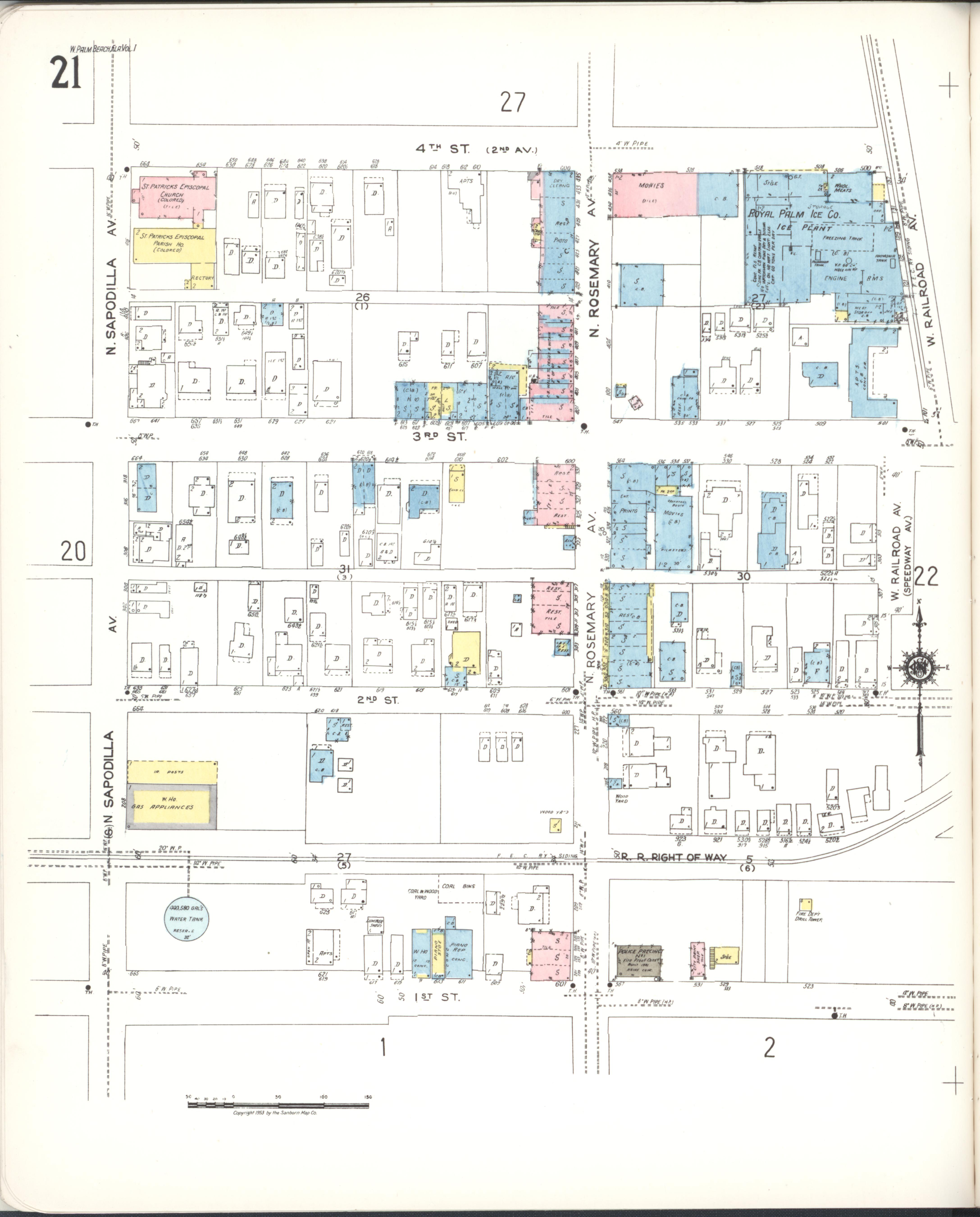
A 1952 Sanborn Fire Insurance Map showing the southeast corner of the Northwest Historic District

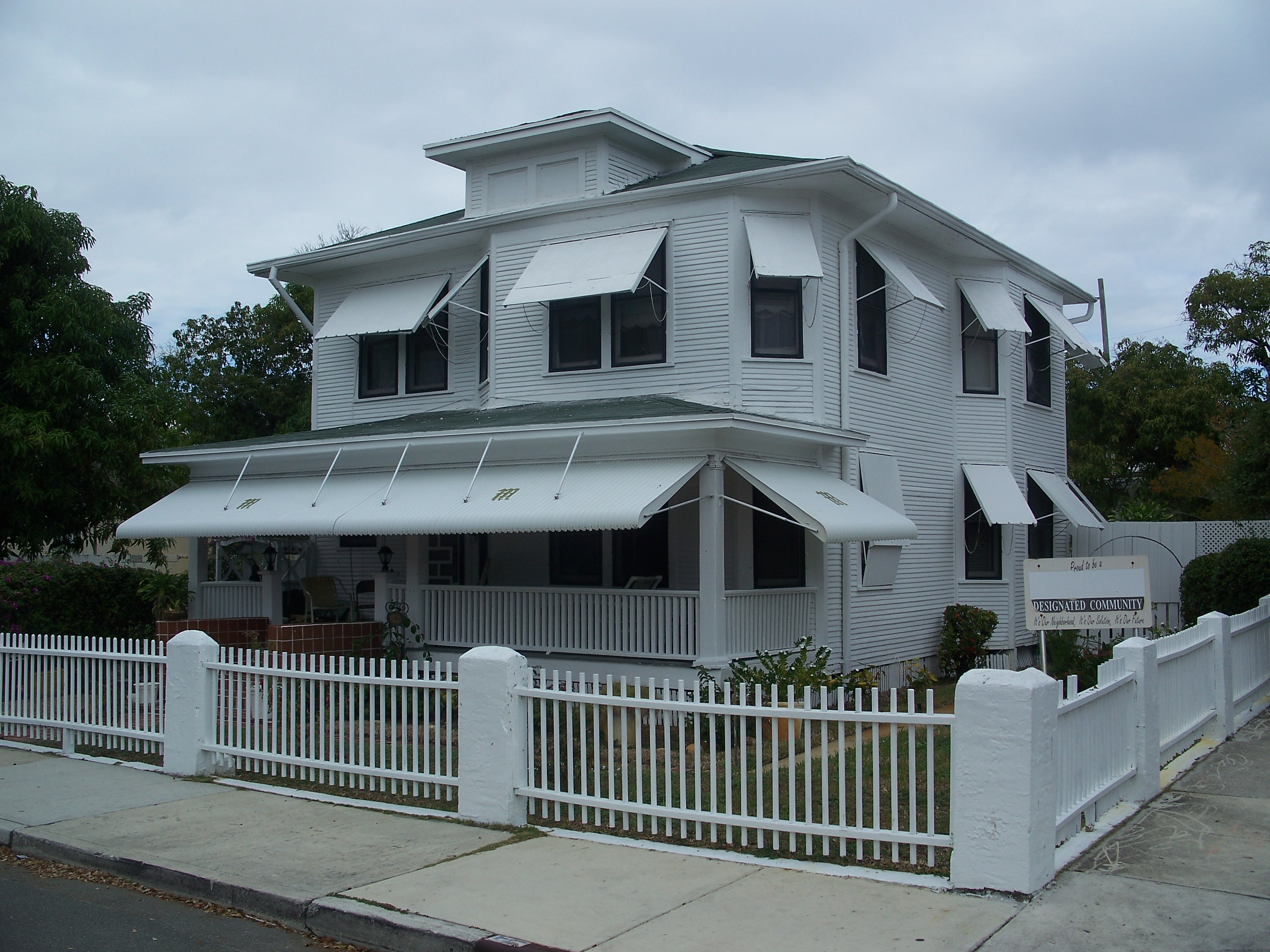
The Mickens House, 801 Fourth Street. This dwelling is an individual listing on the National Register of Historic Places

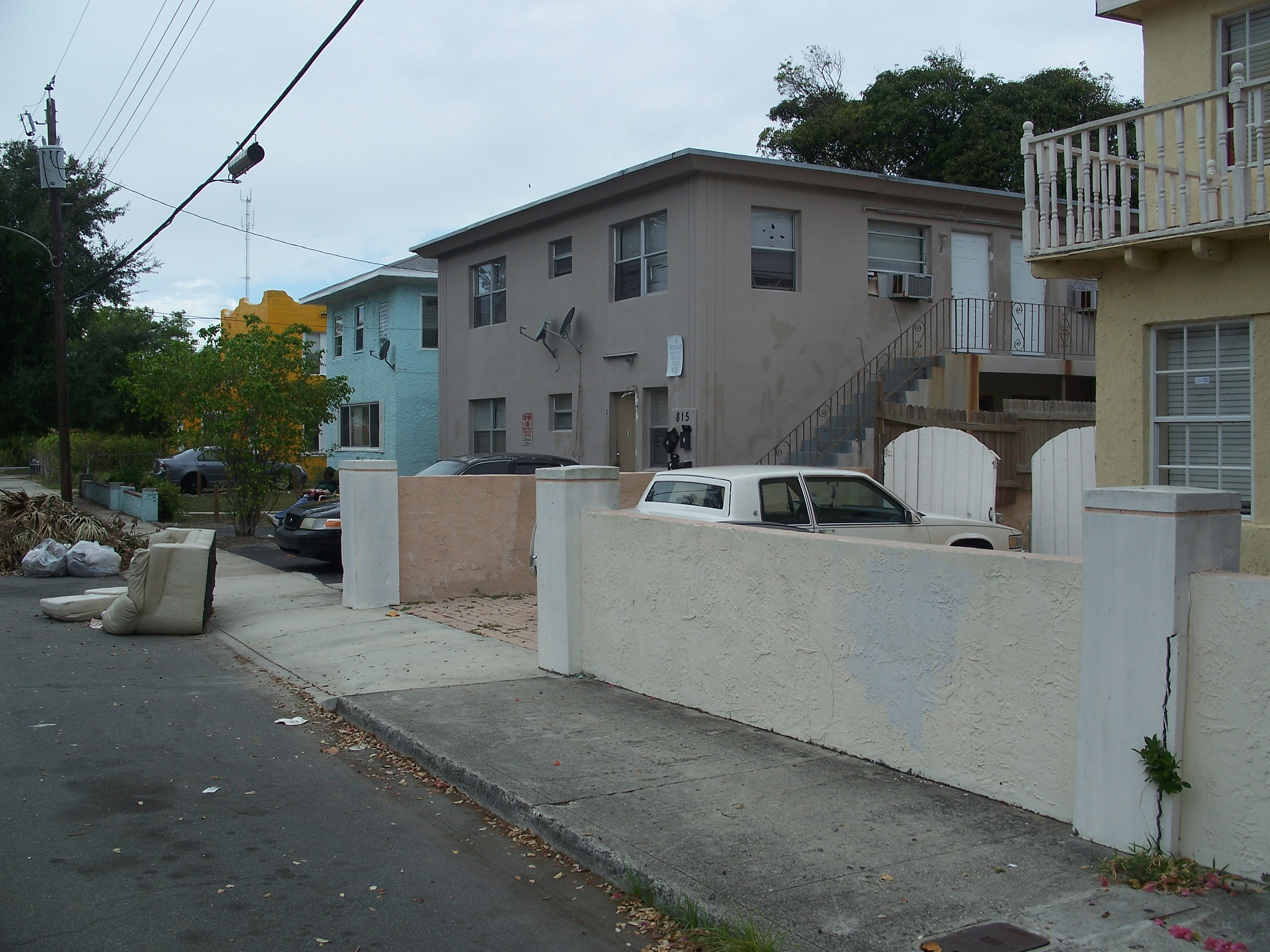
A few structures on Fourth Street

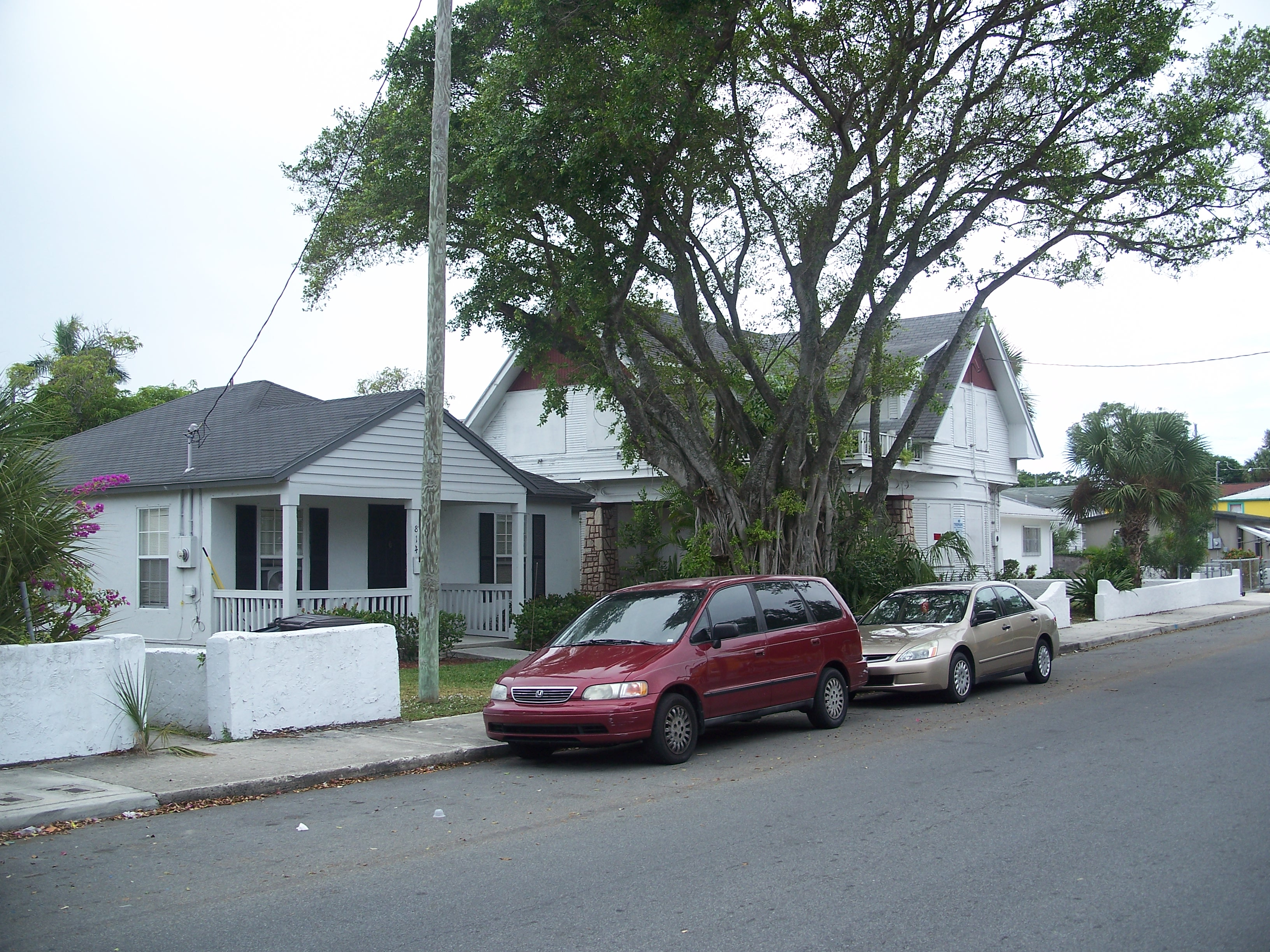
A few other homes on Fourth Street

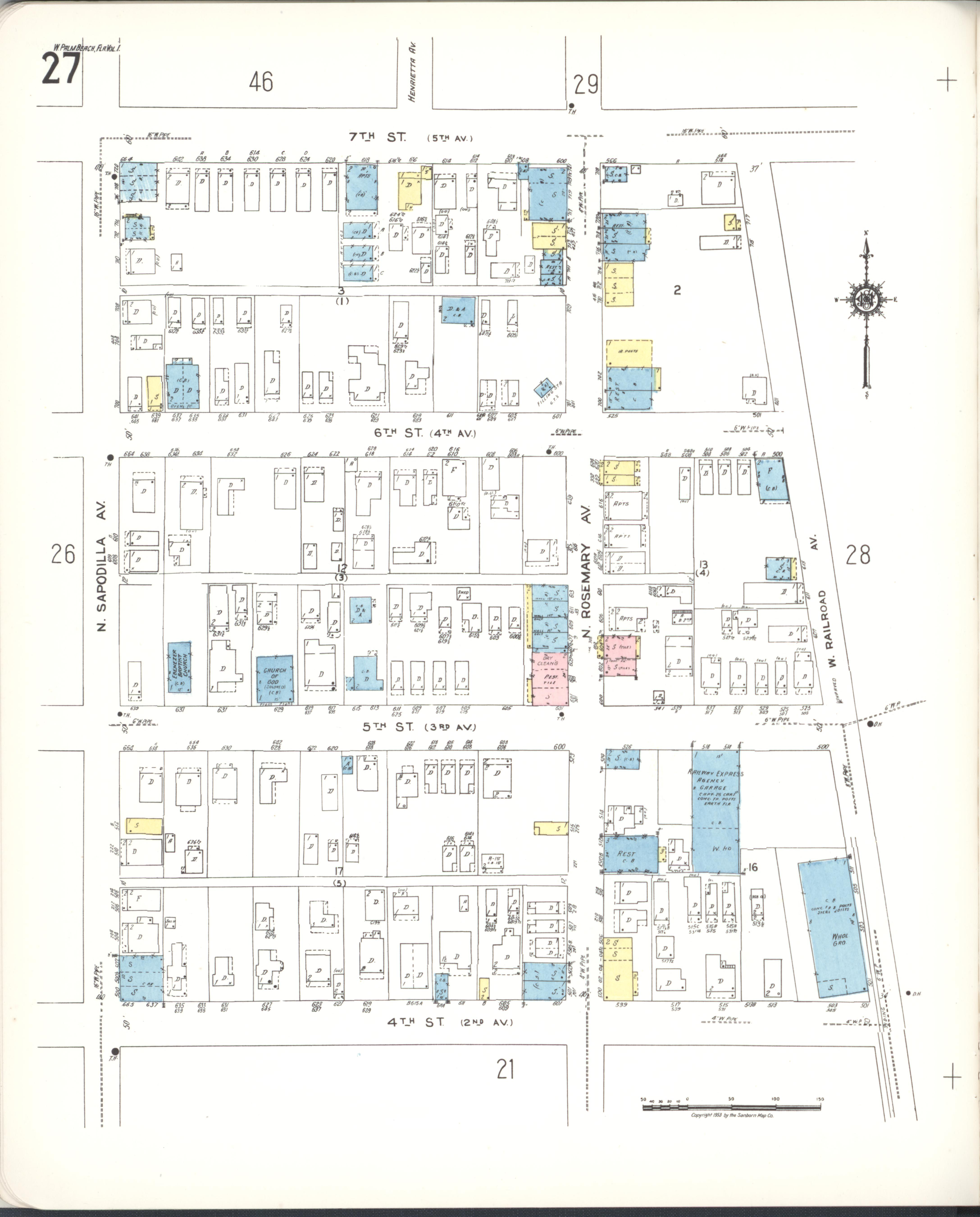
A 1952 Sanborn Fire Insurance Map showing the area from Sapodilla to West Railroad Avenue and Fourth Street to Seventh Street

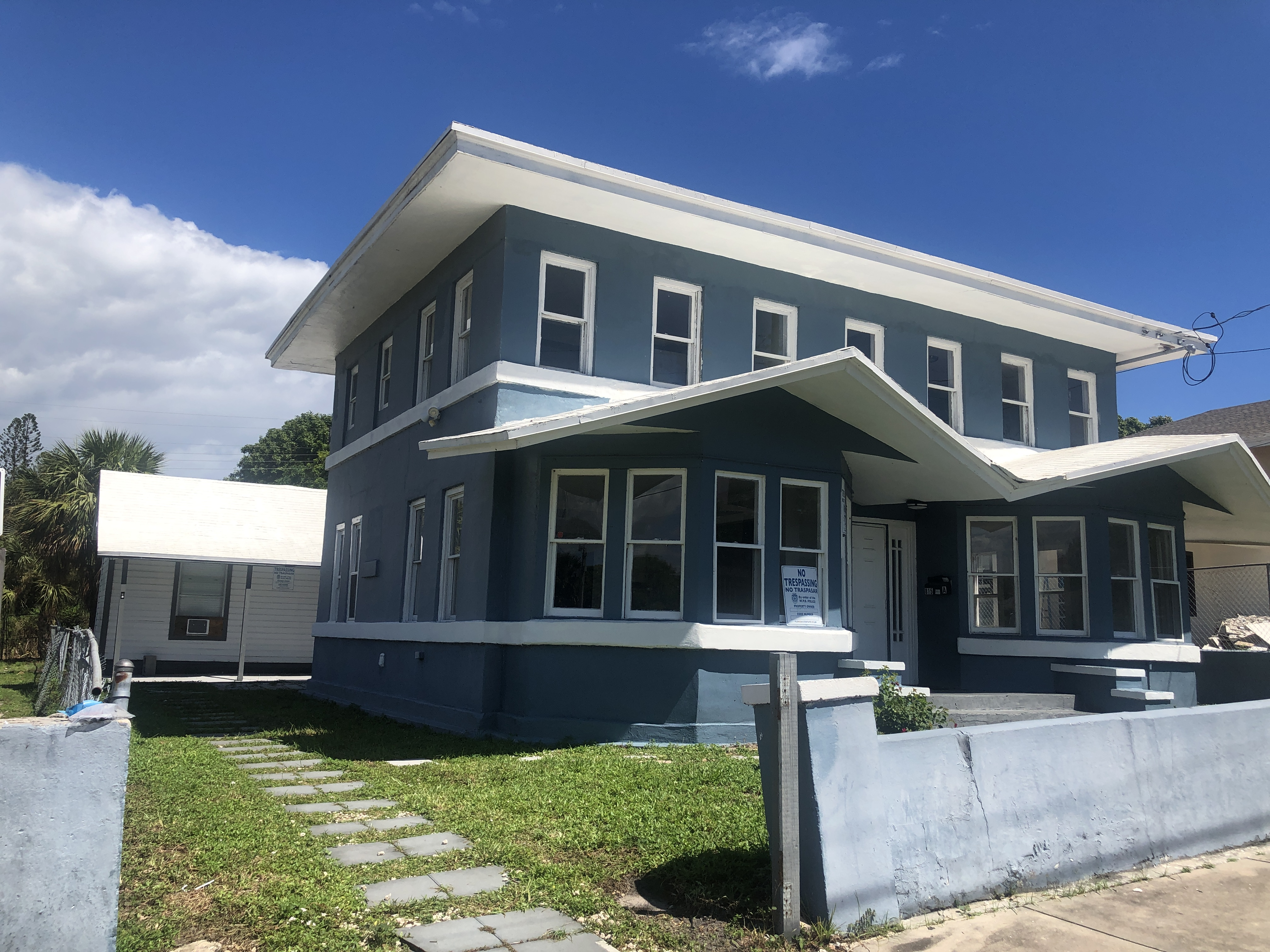
A home at 815 Sixth Street, one of the structures in the Northwest Historic District designed by Hazel Augustus, the first African American architect in West Palm Beach

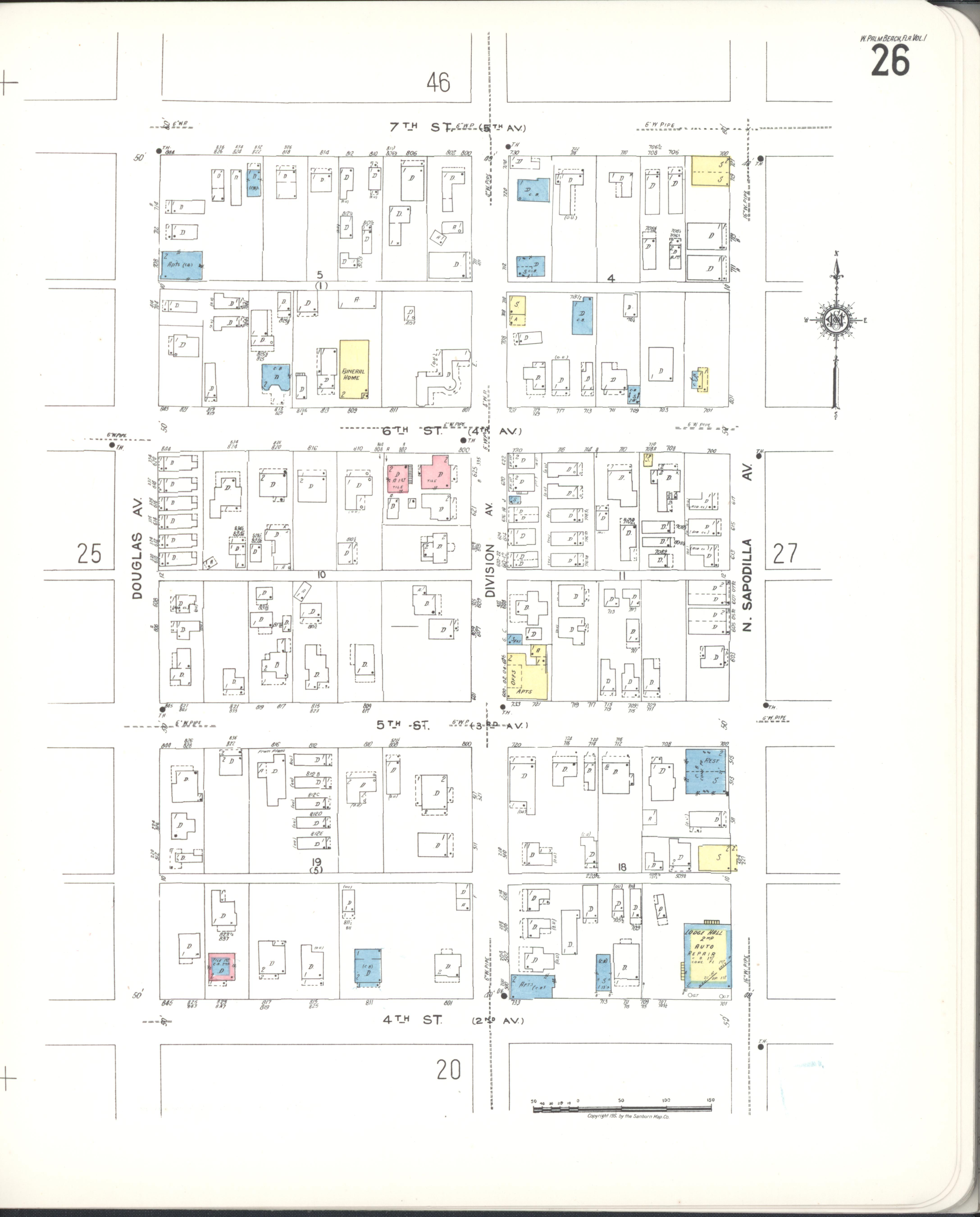
A 1952 Sanborn Fire Insurance Map showing the area from Douglass Avenue to North Sapodilla Avenue and Fourth Street to Seventh Street

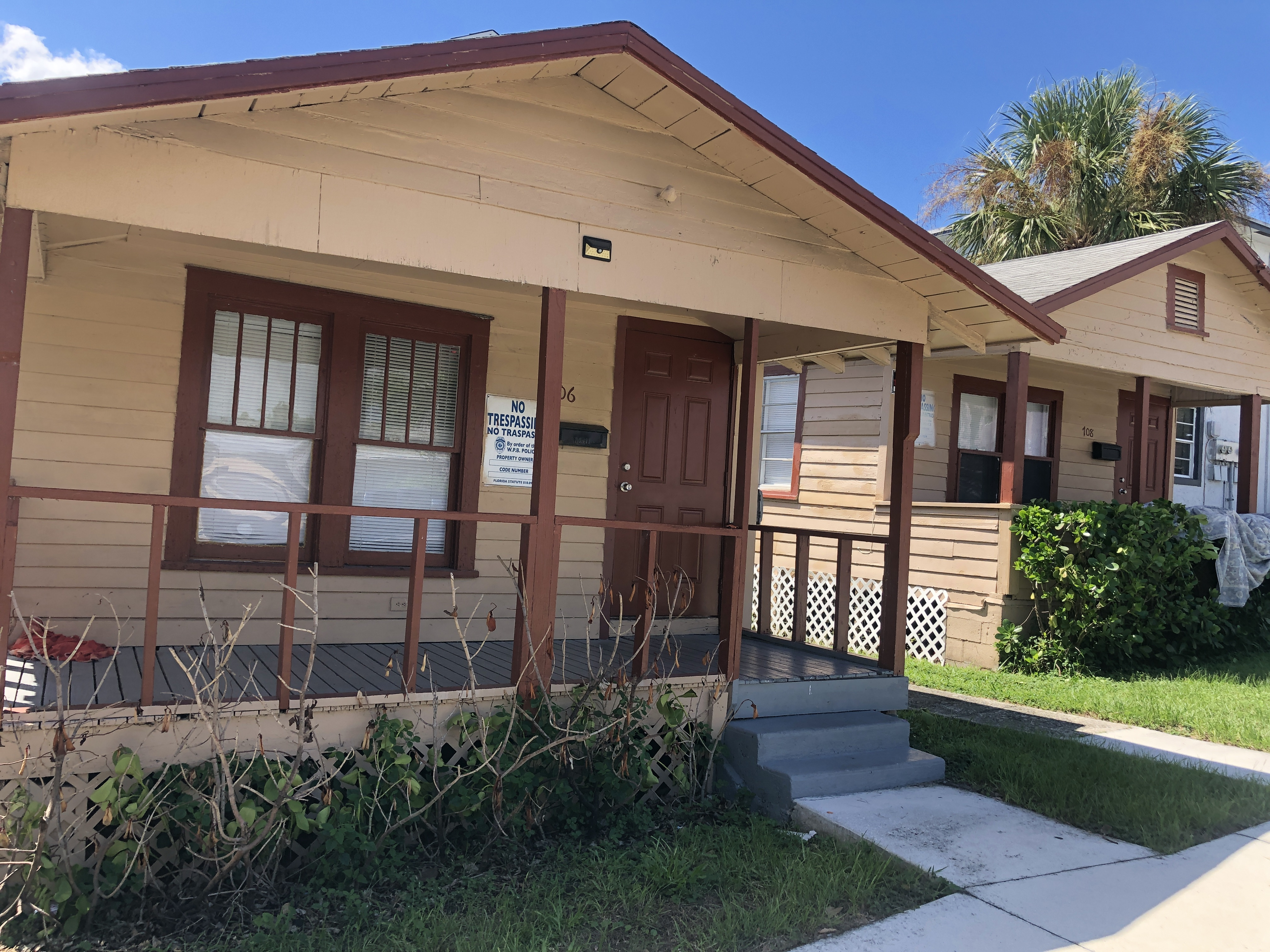
Shotgun homes on Seventh Street

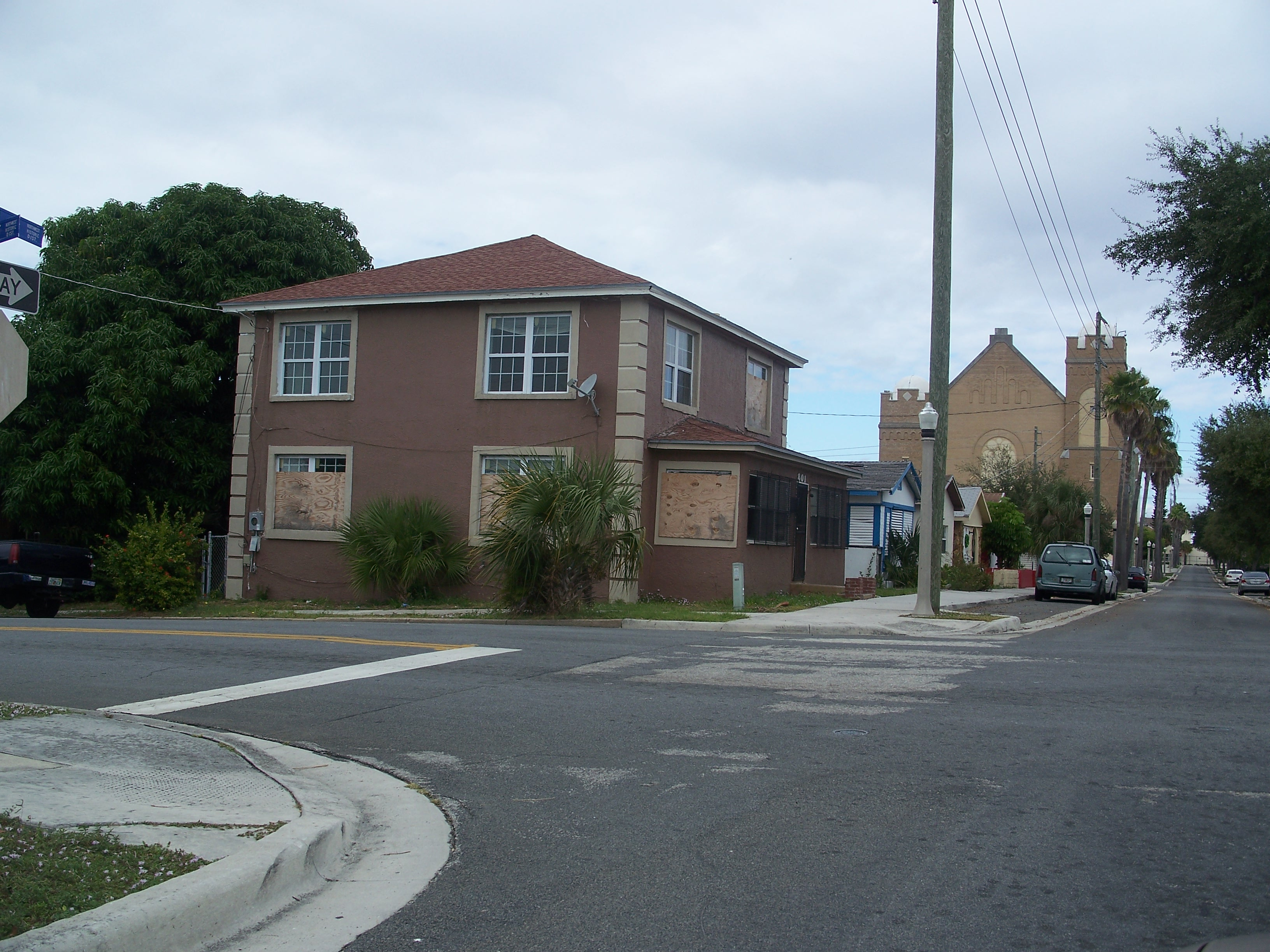
A home at the corner of Seventh Street and Division Avenue. Tabernacle Missionary Baptist Church is visible in the background

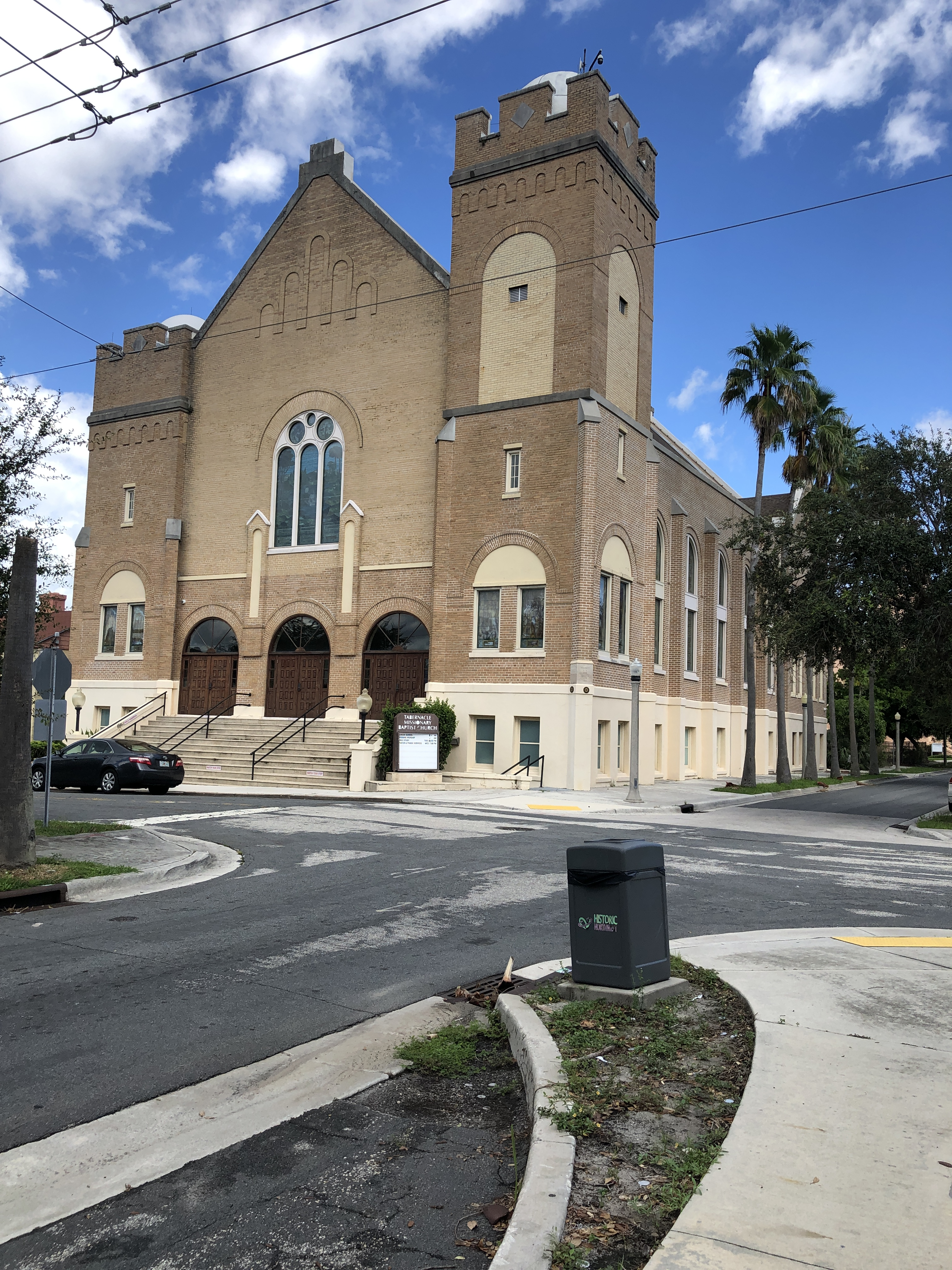
Tabernacle Baptist Church, 801 Eighth Street

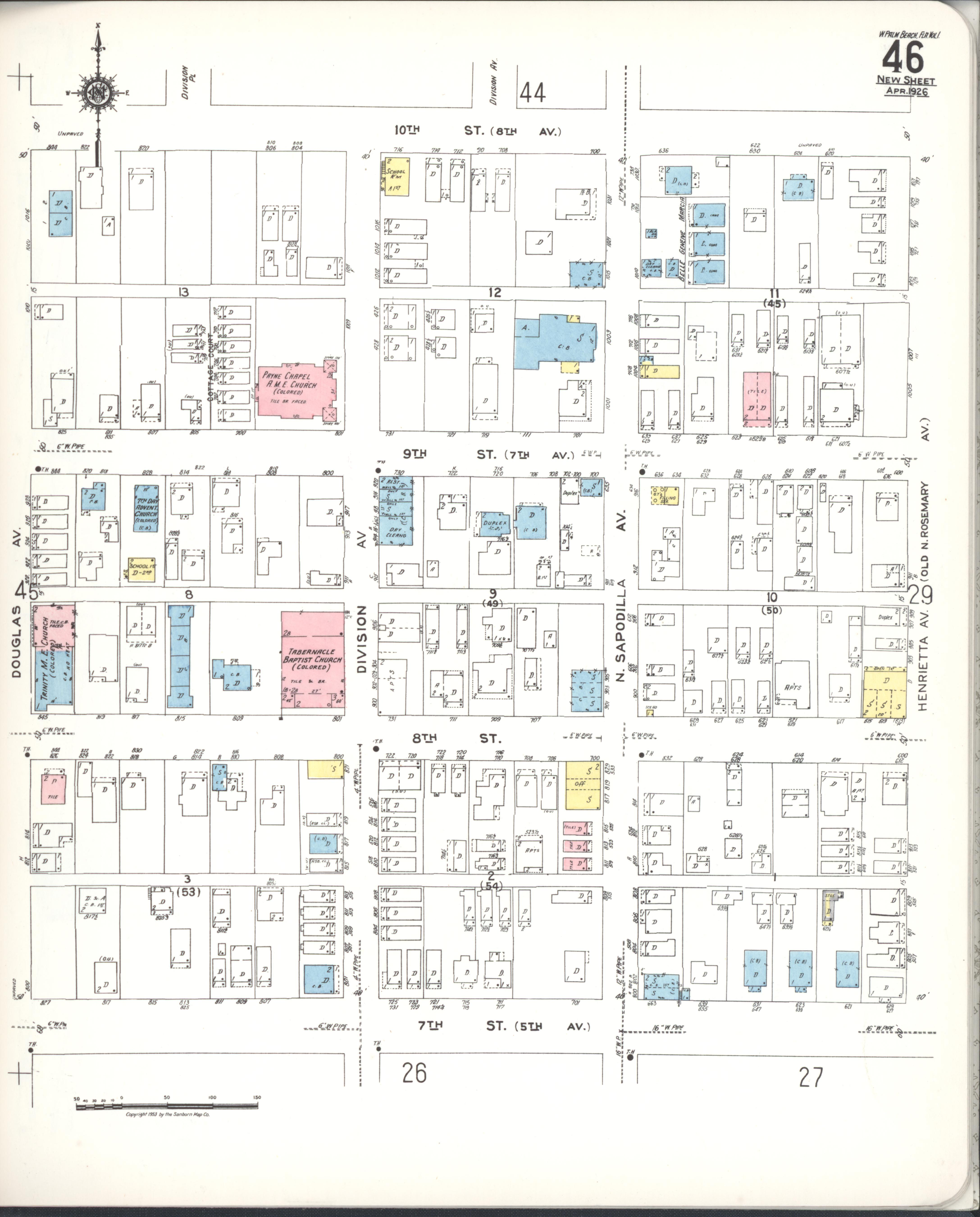
A 1952 Sanborn Fire Insurance Map showing the area from Douglass Avenue to Henrietta Avenue and Seventh to Tenth Street

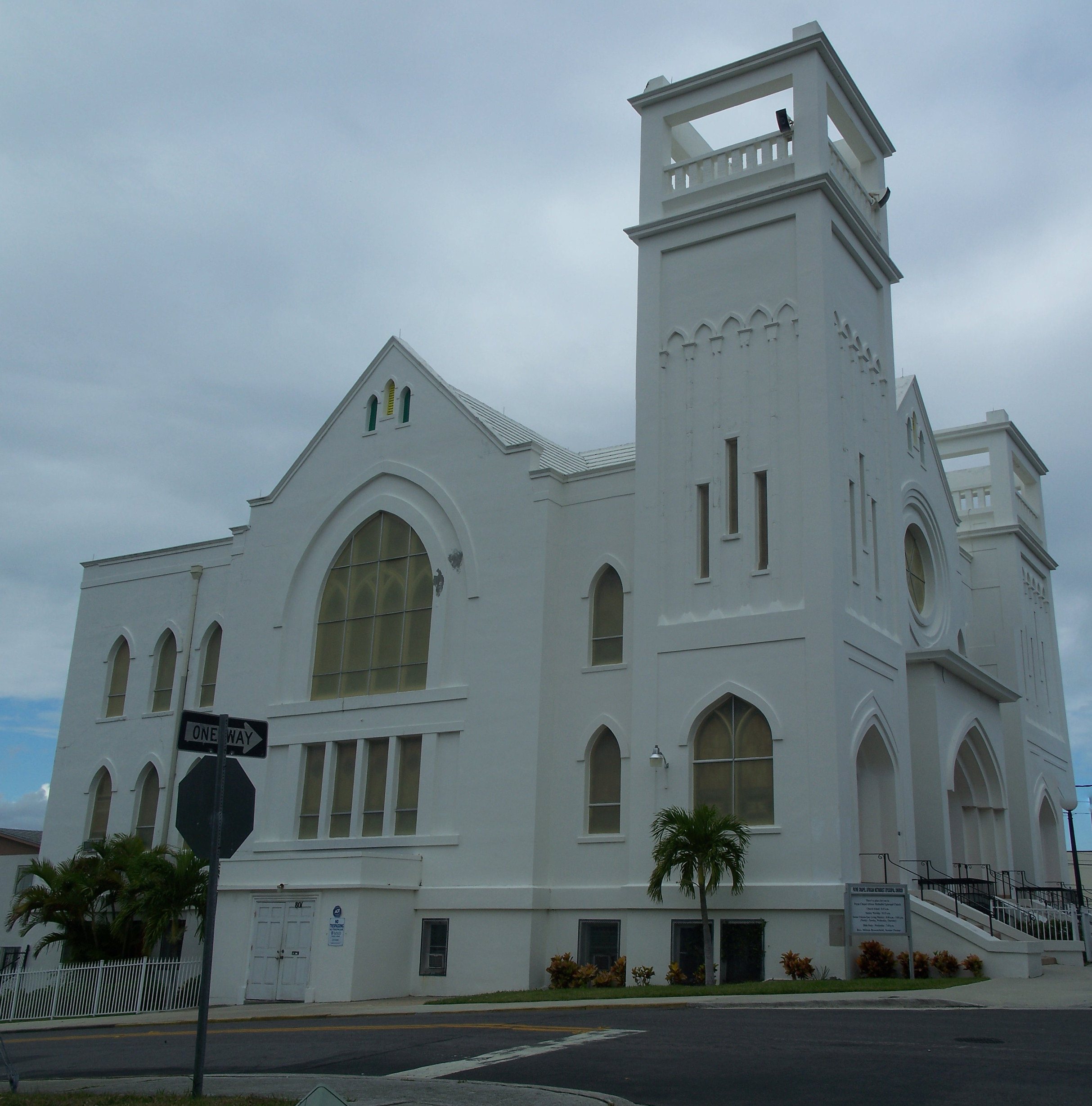
Payne Chapel A.M.E. Church, 801 Ninth Street

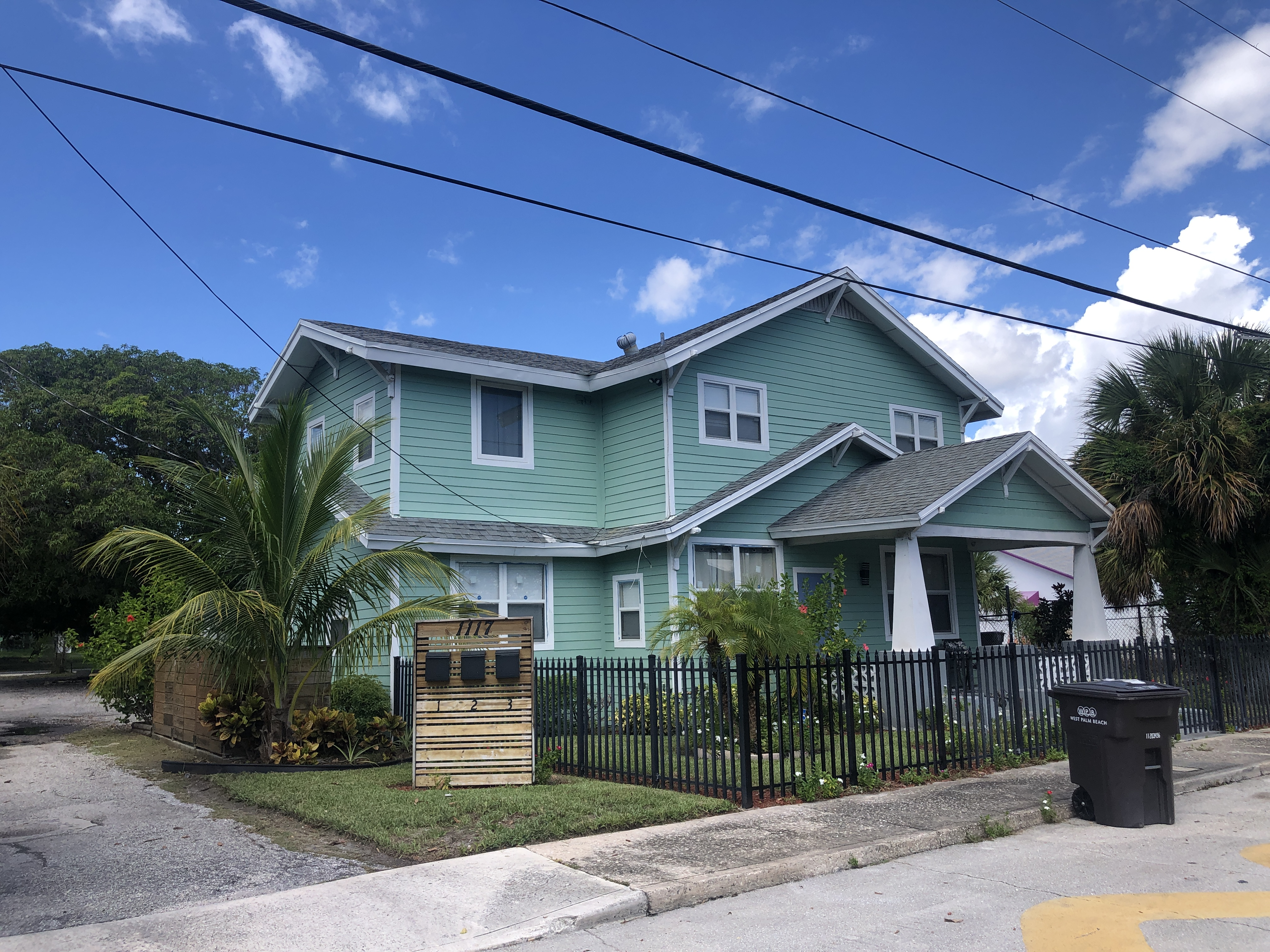
A home at 1117 Rosemary Avenue

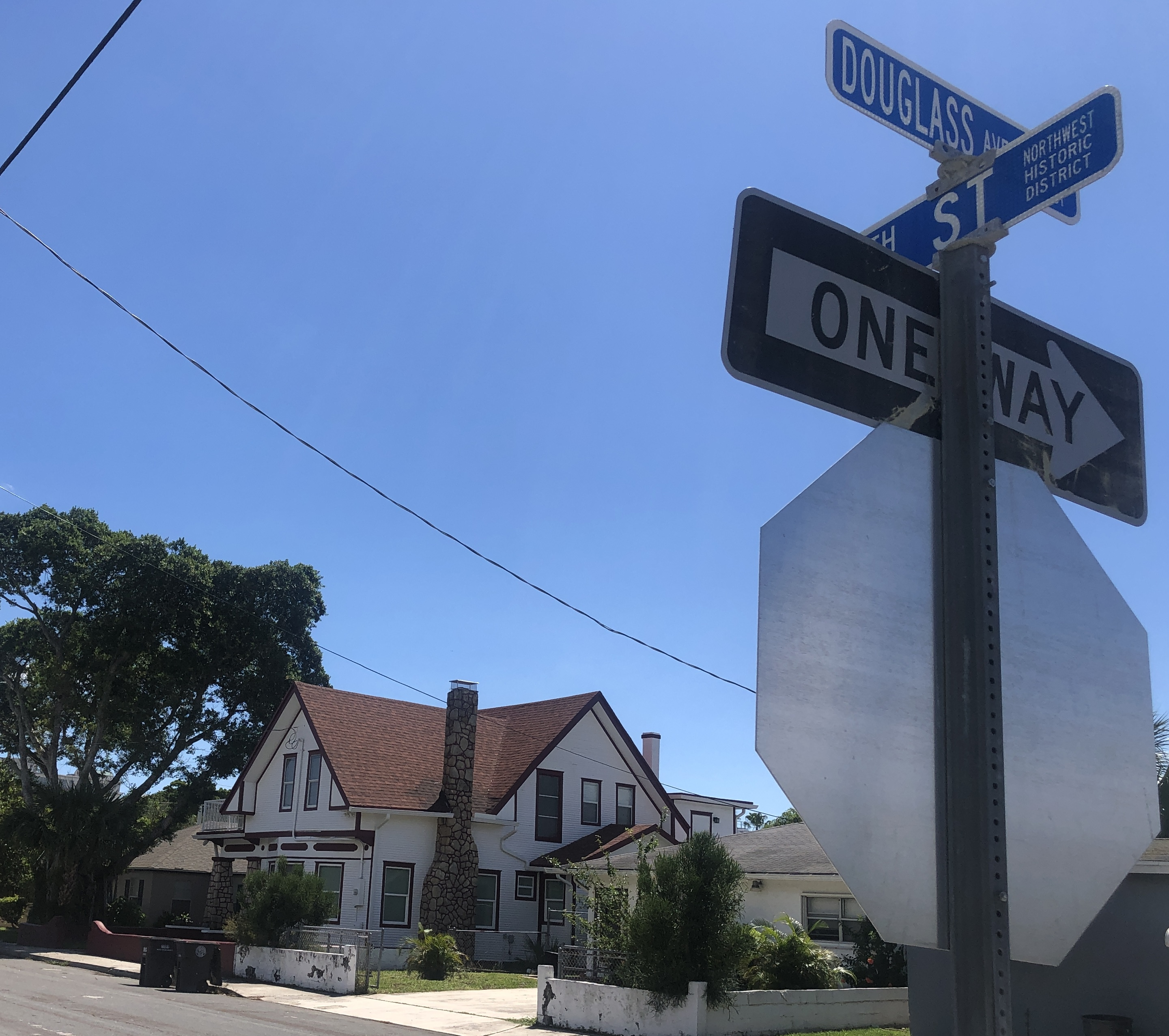
A house near the corner of Douglass Avenue and Fourth Street

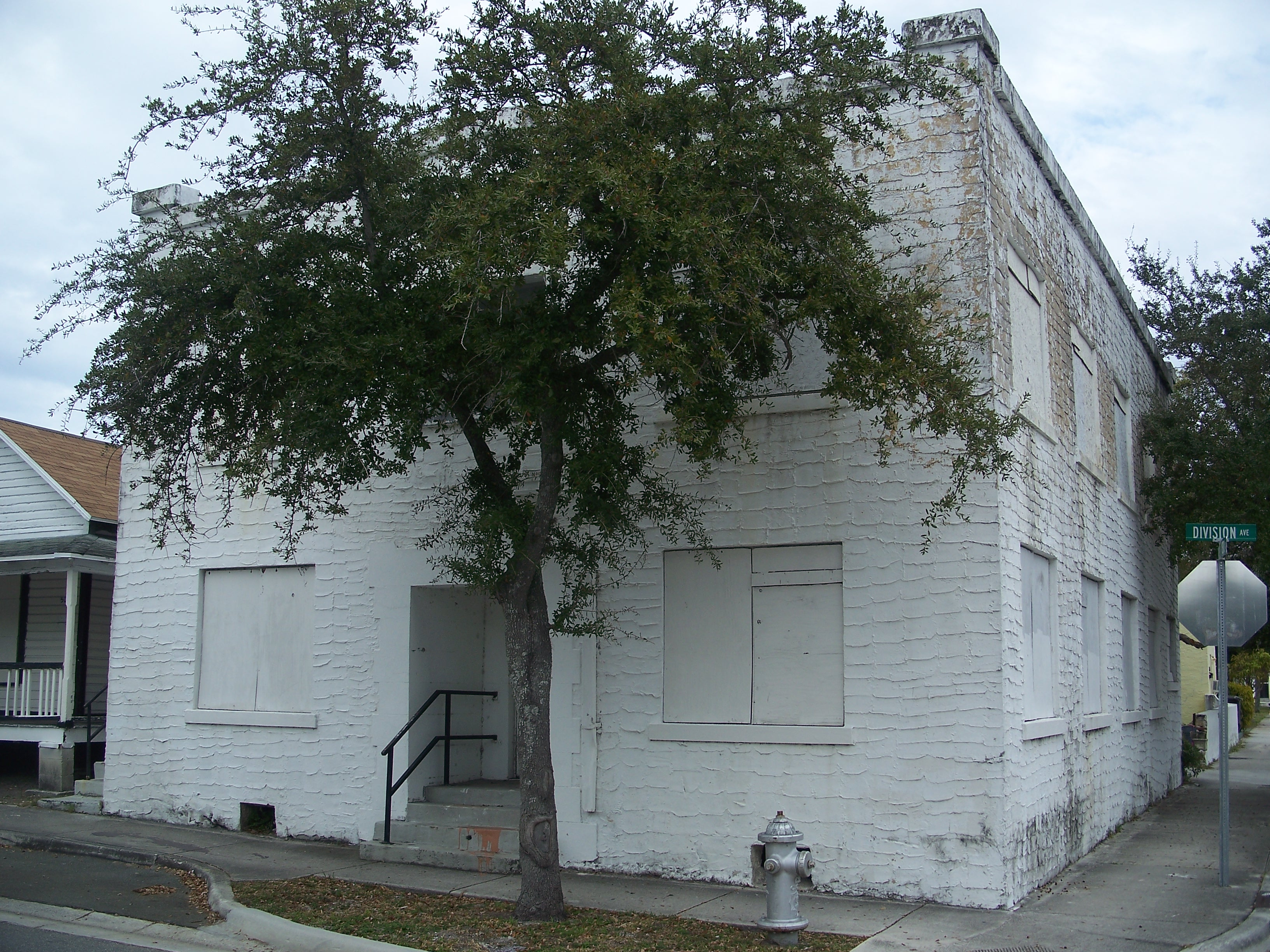
A boarded-up residence at the corner of Division Avenue and Fourth Street

Address	Year built	Structure type	Notes
611 Second Street	1925		
615 1/2 Second Street	1920		
617 1/3 Second Street	1925		
617 1/2 Second Street	1925		
633 Second Street	1927		
913 Second Street	1923	Residence	Known as the Richard and Virginia Vickers House
627 Third Street	1926	Residence	Known as the Nathaniel and Mamie Frederick House
629 Third Street	1924	Residence	Known as the Henry H. Williams House
630 Third Street	1925	Residence	Known as the Mary Williams House
631 Third Street	1920	Residence	Known as the Samuel and Ruby Hayes House
633 Third Street	1923	Residence	Known as the Laura Wright House. Bungalow Craftsman-style architecture.
634 Third Street	1923	Residence	Known as the John H. and Ruth Thompson House. Destroyed by arsonist-started fire in June 2001.
708 Third Street	1923	Residence	Known as the March M. and Susie Miles House. Undergoing restoration via the Community Redevelopment Agency (CRA)
708 1/2 Third Street	1923		
713 Third Street	1923		
718 Third Street	1931	Place of worship	Friendship Baptist Church. Mission-style architecture.
801 Third Street	1921	Residence	Known as the Henry and Hisetta Speed House. Bungalow Craftsman-style architecture. The city of West Palm Beach issued a condemnation order in May 1992.
805 Third Street	1927		
810 Third Street	1916	Residence	Known as the George and Annie Williams House
814-816 Third Street	1927		
814 1/2 Third Street	1927		
816 1/2 Third Street	1927		
819 1/2 Third Street	1930		
822 Third Street	1939		
822 1/2 Third Street	1940		
826 Third Street	1920		
901 Third Street	1935		
915 Third Street	1929		
916 Third Street	1931		
919 Third Street	1938		
922A Third Street	1916		
922B Third Street	1925		
922C Third Street	1925		
926 Third Street	1922		
708 1/2 Fourth Street	1930		
711 Fourth Street	1923	Residence	Known as the Edward and Carrie Lowe House
711A Fourth Street	1923		
711B Fourth Street	1936		
713 Fourth Street	1926		
713A Fourth Street	1924		
713B Fourth Street	1937		
801 Fourth Street	1917	Residence	Known as the Dr. Alice Mickens House. Frame Vernacular-style architecture. Undergoing restoration and transformation into a bed and breakfast.
811 Fourth Street	1941	Residence	Known as the Mattie Bennett House
811 1/2 Fourth Street	1941		
817 Fourth Street	1924	Residence	Known as the John Williams House
818 Fourth Street	1916	Residence	Known as the Allen and Christine Ambrose House
823 Fourth Street	1925	Residence	Known as the Scipio and Emma Perkins House
823 1/2 Fourth Street	1925		
909 Fourth Street	1926		
910 Fourth Street	1929		
617 Fifth Street	1946	Residence	Known as the Joseph and Eula Orr House
617 1/2 Fifth Street	1946		
629 Fifth Street	1931	Place of worship	Church of God
631 Fifth Street	1929	Residence	Known as the Richard and Clementina Smith House
633 Fifth Street	1939	Place of worship	Ebenezer Baptist Church. Gothic Revival-style architecture.
638 Fifth Street	1929		
708 Fifth Street	1929		
714 Fifth Street	1915		
714 1/2 Fifth Street	1915		
716 Fifth Street	1919	Residence	Known as the Harrison-Taylor House
720 Fifth Street	1940		
808 Fifth Street	1930		
809 Fifth Street	1930	Residence	Known as the Robert Franks House
816 Fifth Street	1930		
901 Fifth Street	1930		
906 Fifth Street	1920	Residence	Known as the Andrew Moss House
907 1/2 Fifth Street	1925		
911 Fifth Street	1922		
915 Fifth Street	1929		
927 Fifth Street	1928		
632 Sixth Street	1920		
634 Sixth Street	1926	Residence	Known as the Estelle Blythwood House
635-637 Sixth Street	1921	Duplex	Masonry Vernacular-style architecture.
638 Sixth Street	1925	Residence/ community building	Known as the Daniel Miller House. Currently houses True Fast Outreach Ministries, a food pantry.
639 Sixth Street	1921		
641 Sixth Street	1921	Residence	
705 Sixth Street	1927	Residence	Known as the Alfred and Roberta Williams House
708 Sixth Street	1919	Residence	Known as the Richard and Julia Jackson House. Frame Vernacular-style architecture.
709 Sixth Street	1925	Residence	Known as the Clayton and Charlotte Wims House
716A Sixth Street	1927	Residence	
716B Sixth Street	1927	Residence	
716C Sixth Street	1927	Residence	
716D Sixth Street	1927	Residence	
716E Sixth Street	1927	Residence	
717 Sixth Street	1920		
802 Sixth Street	1926		
809 Sixth Street	1926	Commercial	Joseph Bonner Funeral Home
813 Sixth Street	1925	Residence	Known as the James and Amanda Cromer House
813 1/2 Sixth Street	1925		
815 Sixth Street	1921	Residence	A home designed by Hazel Augustus, West Palm Beach's first African American architect
815 1/2 Sixth Street	1921		
816 Sixth Street	1920	Residence	Known as the Joseph and Minnie Arrington House
819 Sixth Street	1940		
617 Seventh Street	1936	Residence	
620 Seventh Street	1924		
623 Seventh Street	1919		
624 Seventh Street	1924		
628 Seventh Street	1924		
630 Seventh Street	1924		
631 Seventh Street	1919		
634 Seventh Street	1924		
638 Seventh Street	1924		
642 Seventh Street	1925		Frame Vernacular-style architecture.
706 Seventh Street	1932		
708 Seventh Street	1932		
716 Seventh Street	1919	Residence	
809 Seventh Street	1921	Residence	Known as the Sam and Eva Gibson House
811 Seventh Street	1925	Residence	
811 1/2 Seventh Street	1925		
817 Seventh Street	1929	Commercial	Huff Undertaking Company. Frame Vernacular-style architecture.
817 1/2 Seventh Street	1929		
822 1/2 Seventh Street	1920		
904 Seventh Street	1925		The city of West Palm Beach issued a condemnation order in June 2003.
907 Seventh Street	1924		
909 Seventh Street	1924	Residence	Damaged by a fire in January 1995.
910-912 Seventh Street	1937	Residence	Known as the William and Fannie Smith House
911 Seventh Street	1930		
915 Seventh Street	1930	Residence	Mistakenly demolished around 2005. Its owners sued the city and were awarded $121,000 with interest six years later.
920 Seventh Street	1930	Residence	
920 1/2 Seventh Street	1935		
922 Seventh Street	1935	Residence	
609 Eighth Street	1933	Entertainment venue	Sunset Lounge
612 Eighth Street	1926	Residence	Known as the Kingsley Knowles House
613-615 Eighth Street	1924	Apartments	
623 Eighth Street	1923		
623 1/2 Eighth Street	1923		
625 Eighth Street	1923	Residence	
625 1/2 Eighth Street	1923		
629 Eighth Street	1923	Residence	
629 1/2 Eighth Street	1923		
706 Eighth Street	1928		
708 Eighth Street	1928		
709 Eighth Street	1925	Residence	Known as the Charles and Fannie Lundy House
711 Eighth Street	1925		
711 1/3 Eighth Street	1925		
711 1/2 Eighth Street	1925		
801 Eighth Street	1925	Place of worship	Tabernacle Mission Baptist Church. Romanesque Revival-style architecture.
809 Eighth Street	1930	Parsonage	Tabernacle Parish House
814 Eighth Street	1922	Residence	Known as the Annie Jackson House
818 Eighth Street	1924	Residence	Known as the Luther and Helen Ross House
819 Eighth Street	1923	Place of worship	Trinity Methodist Episcopal Church
910 Eighth Street	1927	Residence	Known as the William Winn House. Includes two outbuildings
912 Eighth Street	1927		
913 Eighth Street	1925		
914 Eighth Street	1920	Residence	Known as the John and Clara Winn House
917A Eighth Street	1941		
917B Eighth Street	1941		
917C Eighth Street	1941		
917D Eighth Street	1941		
918 Eighth Street	1920		
920 Eighth Street	1920		
927 Eighth Street	1924	Residence	Known as the Ellen Williams House
603 Ninth Street	1930		
603 1/2A Ninth Street	1930		
603 1/2B Ninth Street	1930		
607 Ninth Street	1928	Residence	Known as the Wiliam and Josephine Simmons House
618 Ninth Street	1922	Residence	Known as the Walter and Mary Alford House
621 Ninth Street	1926	Residence	Known as the Davis-Brown House
622 Ninth Street	1926		
629 Ninth Street	1927		
629 1/2 Ninth Street	1927		
631 Ninth Street	1927		
637 Ninth Street	1919		
639 Ninth Street	1919		
701 Ninth Street	1924	Residence	Known as the Joseph and Sallie Johnson House
706 Ninth Street	1926	Residence	Known as the Fred and Viola Lowe House
719 Ninth Street	1925		
720 1/2 Ninth Street	1930		
722 Ninth Street	1925	Residence	Known as the Nathaniel and Annie Major House
801 Ninth Street	1925	Place of worship	Payne Chapel A.M.E. Church. Gothic Revival-style architecture.
814 Ninth Street	1935	Residence	Known as the Ozzie Brown House
814 1/2A Ninth Street	1922	Residence	Known as the Annie Jackson House
814 1/2B Ninth Street	1922		
816 Ninth Street	1929	Place of worship	Seventh Day Adventist Church. Gothic Revival-style architecture.
818 Ninth Street	1930		
818 1/2 Ninth Street	1930		
825 Ninth Street	1922		
909 Ninth Street	1931	Residence	Known as the Thomas and Mary Williams House
909 1/2 Ninth Street	1935		
911 Ninth Street	1931	Place of worship	New Bethel Missionary Baptist Church
918 Ninth Street	1927		
925 Ninth Street	1927	Residence	Known as the Robie Horton House
604 Tenth Street	1926	Residence	Known as the James and Evangeline Akins House
610 Tenth Street	1932	Residence	Known as the Percy and Maude Johnson House
621 Tenth Street	1928	Residence	Known as the Georgia Tate House. Severely damaged due to a fire started by an arsonist in July 2001.
624 Tenth Street	1930	Residence	Known as the James and Clarinda House
630 1/2 Tenth Street	1930		
631 Tenth Street	1923	Residence	Known as the Charlie Webb House. Includes one outbuilding
712 Tenth Street	1937	Residence	Slated for demolition in March 1995 due to its dilapidated condition and likely association with illicit drug-related activity.
714 Tenth Street	1937	Residence	Slated for demolition in March 1995 due to its dilapidated condition and likely association with illicit drug-related activity.
716 Tenth Street	1937	Residence	Slated for demolition in March 1995 due to its dilapidated condition and likely association with illicit drug-related activity.
820 Tenth Street	1930	Residence	Known as the John Trapp House
821 Tenth Street	1929	Residence	Known as the Mitchell and Daisy Thomas House
822 Tenth Street	1931	Residence	Known as the Roy and Virginia Kress House
825 Tenth Street	1931		
908 Tenth Street	1931	Residence	Known as the Elizabeth Johnson House
908 1/2 Tenth Street	1932		
914 Tenth Street	1925		
918 Tenth Street	1926	Residence	Known as the James and Frederica Smith House
624 Eleventh Street	1930		
624 1/2 Eleventh Street	1930		
628 Eleventh Street	1927		
818 Eleventh Street	1933	Residence	Known as the Wiley and Maude Crawford House
830 Eleventh Street	1930	Residence	Known as the Daniel Madison House
901 Rosemary Avenue	1933	Residence	Known as the Robert L. Saunders House
913 Rosemary Avenue	1925		
915 Rosemary Avenue	1925		
1001 Rosemary Avenue	1927		
1017 Rosemary Avenue	1927	Commercial/apartment	Damaged in 1993 by two fires that officials considered suspicious. The second fire destroyed the apartment on the second floor.
1019 Rosemary Avenue	1926	Residence	Burned in multiple fires, including an incident of arson in April 2001.
1113 Rosemary Avenue	1940		
1115 Rosemary Avenue	1930		
1117 Rosemary Avenue	1927		
1114 Henrietta Avenue	1929	Residence	Known as the Leila Randall House. The city of West Palm Beach issued a condemnation order in June 2003.
311 Sapodilla Avenue	1934		
313 Sapodilla Avenue	1934		
317-325 Sapodilla Avenue	1929	Commercial	J.C. Lake Building
418 Sapodilla Avenue	1929	Place of worship	Known as the St. Patrick's Episcopal. Gothic Revival-style architecture.
500 Sapodilla Avenue	1930	Commercial	
510 Sapodilla Avenue	1920		
512 Sapodilla Avenue	1920		
613 Sapodilla Avenue	1936		
615 Sapodilla Avenue	1933		
710 Sapodilla Avenue	1924		The city of West Palm Beach issued a condemnation order in June 2003.
711 Sapodilla Avenue	1925	Residence	Severely damaged by a fire in December 1995.
713 Sapodilla Avenue	1925		
714 Sapodilla Avenue	1940		
719-721 Sapodilla Avenue	1938	Commercial	Undergoing restoration and transformation into a restaurant via the CRA.
720 Sapodilla Avenue	1928	Commercial	
800 Sapodilla Avenue	1929		
813 Sapodilla Avenue	1921	Residence	Known as the Cecilia Saunders House
815 Sapodilla Avenue	1922		
817-829 Sapodilla Avenue	1935	Residence	Known as the Thomas R. Vickers House
900 Sapodilla Avenue	1938	Apartments	Masonry Vernacular-style architecture.
902 Sapodilla Avenue	1923		
911 Sapodilla Avenue	1928	Residence	
912-916 Sapodilla Avenue	1926	Commercial/Residence	Known as the Wilson Filling Station and House
1004 Sapodilla Avenue	1919		
1006 Sapodilla Avenue	1919		
1008 Sapodilla Avenue	1919		
1010 Sapodilla Avenue	1928		
1010 1/2 Sapodilla Avenue	1928		
1031 Sapodilla Avenue	1918	Residence	Undergoing restoration and transformation into affordable housing via the CRA.
411 Division Avenue	1922		
412 Division Avenue	1925		
414 Division Avenue	1925		
419 Division Avenue	1925	Residence	Known as the Carrie L. Blaine House
500 Division Avenue	1926	Apartments/hotel	Masonry Vernacular-style architecture. Described by The Palm Beach Post as a former "hotel that housed black jazz legends and Negro League baseball stars."
502 Division Avenue	1926		
506 Division Avenue	1920	Residence	
508 Division Avenue	1920		
510 Division Avenue	1920		
511 Division Avenue	1925		
517 Division Avenue	1925	Residence	Known as the Phyllis Washington House. Frame Vernacular-style architecture.
625 Division Avenue	1926	Residence	Known as the Mollie Holt-Gwen Cherry House. Acquired by the Palm Beach County Black Historical; Preservation Society in 1986. However, vandalism, burglaries, and hurricanes Frances and Jeanne damaged the property enough that it was razed in January 2005.
710 Division Avenue	1926		
711 Division Avenue	1923	Residence	
801 Division Avenue	1919		
807 Division Avenue	1922		The city of West Palm Beach issued a condemnation order for this structure in October 2017.
809 Division Avenue	1922		
810 Division Avenue	1921	Residence	
811 Division Avenue	1922		
812 Division Avenue	1921		
813 Division Avenue	1921		
814 Division Avenue	1921		
817 Division Avenue	1931		
821 Division Avenue	1931		
906 Division Avenue	1930		
911 Division Avenue	1930		
1012 Division Avenue	1930	Residence	Slated for demolition in March 1995 due to its dilapidated condition and likely association with illicit drug-related activity.
1014 Division Avenue	1937	Residence	Slated for demolition in March 1995 due to its dilapidated condition and likely association with illicit drug-related activity.
1016 Division Avenue	1937	Residence	Slated for demolition in March 1995 due to its dilapidated condition and likely association with illicit drug-related activity.
1109 Division Avenue	1915	Residence	
409 Douglass Avenue	1916	Residence	Known as the Edward Williams House
415 Douglass Avenue	1930		
424 Douglass Avenue	1925		
519 Douglass Avenue	1927		
610 Douglass Avenue	1923	Residence	A fire started in this shotgun house in February 2026 destroyed three dwellings.
612 Douglass Avenue	1923		
614 Douglass Avenue	1923		
615 Douglass Avenue	1930		
616 Douglass Avenue	1923		
618 Douglass Avenue	1923		
620 Douglass Avenue	1923		
704 Douglass Avenue	1929		
704 1/2A Douglass Avenue	1929		
704 1/2B Douglass Avenue	1929		
708 Douglass Avenue	1918		
813 Douglass Avenue	1923		
815 Douglass Avenue	1923		
913 Douglass Avenue	1940		
915 Douglass Avenue	1926		
917 Douglass Avenue	1926		
920 Douglass Avenue	1940	Residence	Part of a group of five row houses.
921 Douglass Avenue	1923		
922 Douglass Avenue	1923	Residence	Part of a group of five row houses.
924 Douglass Avenue	1923	Residence	Part of a group of five row houses.
926 Douglass Avenue	1923	Residence	Part of a group of five row houses.
928 Douglass Avenue	1923	Residence	Part of a group of five row houses.
1120 Douglass Avenue	1928		
1124 Douglass Avenue	1926	Residence	Known as the Bradger and Rosa Young House
302 Tamarind Avenue	1928		
400 Tamarind Avenue	1928	Residence	Known as the Lulu Reddick House
500-504 Tamarind Avenue	1926	Commercial/apartment	Cameron Filling Station & Apartments
605 Tamarind Avenue	1933		
608 Tamarind Avenue	1933		
712 Tamarind Avenue	1929		
716 Tamarind Avenue	1928	Residence	Destroyed by arson in September 1995. The suspect told investigators that he burned the house down due to it being used by crack cocaine addicts and dealers. However, police noted that no illicit drug-related activity had been reported at that dwelling.
800 Tamarind Avenue	1922	Residence	Known as the Georgianna Hills House
822 Tamarind Avenue	1922		
824 Tamarind Avenue	1921		
1012-1016 Tamarind Avenue	1929	Commercial	Robinson & Johnson Grocery
1028-1030 Tamarind Avenue	1940	Commercial	Formerly a restaurant and bar known as The Plantation Inn.

== Non-contributing and other structures ==
The National Register of Historic Places (NRHP) also lists 153 properties as non-contributing to the historic character of the district, as these structures were constructed after 1941 or have been significantly modified. Because the city of West Palm Beach defines the historic district as existing as far north as Fifteen Street, it thus includes notable structures such as the Jenkins House and Pine Ridge Hospital. The former, located at 815 Palm Beach Lakes Boulevard, was the home of pharmacist Joseph Wiley Jenkins. The Pine Ridge Hospital is located at 1401 Division Avenue. It served as a hospital for African Americans during the era of Jim Crow laws and was listed on the NRHP on January 26, 2001. The Northwest Historic District, Jenkins House, and Pine Ridge Hospital are all listed as part of the Florida Black Heritage Trail.

== See also ==
- National Register of Historic Places listings in Palm Beach County, Florida
