= Industrial High School (West Palm Beach, Florida) =

Industrial High School is a former high school located at 800 11th St., West Palm Beach, Florida. The building is currently used by U. B. Kinsey/Palmview Elementary School. It opened in 1914 as the first high school for African Americans in Palm Beach County; the last class graduated in 1950, when a new school for African Americans, Roosevelt Junior-Senior High School, opened. It was the "center of attention" for the black community "that straddled Tamarind Avenue." (See Northwest Historic District.) The school is part of the Florida Black Heritage Trail.

A notable teacher at Industrial High School was Charles Stebbins Jr. While white teachers in Palm Beach County who served for at least five years received a raise of $25 per month in 1941, no additional compensation was offered to African American teachers who met that qualification. Consequently, the Palm Beach County Teachers Association filed a federal lawsuit, with Stebbins volunteering his name for the litigation. Stebbins was fired but then offered his job back for $500 if he dropped the lawsuit. He refused to do so but instead worked at a restaurant in New York when the judge ruled in his favor later in 1941, so Stebbins did not personally benefit from the litigation's outcome. University of Florida professor Kevin McCarthy argued that this lawsuit was one of several that led to the Brown v. Board of Education ruling in 1954 that racially integrated schools.
