= Tabernacle Chapel =

Tabernacle Chapel may refer to:

- Tabernacle Chapel, Abercynon
- Tabernacle Chapel, Aberdare
- Tabernacle Chapel, Cardiff
- Tabernacle Baptist Chapel, Cwmyoy
- Tabernacle Chapel, Llandovery
- Tabernacle Chapel, Llanelli
- Tabernacle Chapel, Morriston
- Tabernacle Chapel, Roath
- Tabernacle Chapel, Whitchurch
- Tabernacle Chapel, Ynysybwl

== See also ==
- Tabernacle Baptist Church (disambiguation)
