= Tabernacle Baptist Church =

Tabernacle Baptist Church may refer to:

- Tabernacle Baptist Church (Fort Worth), a National Register of Historic Places listing in Texas
- Tabernacle Baptist Church (Manhattan), a former church
- Tabernacle Baptist Church (Selma, Alabama), a National Register of Historic Places listing
- Tabernacle Baptist Church (Utica, New York), a National Register of Historic Places listing
- Tabernacle Baptist Church (West Palm Beach), a National Register of Historic Places contributing property in Florida
