= Sunset Lounge =

Coordinates: 26°43′15″N 80°03′26″W

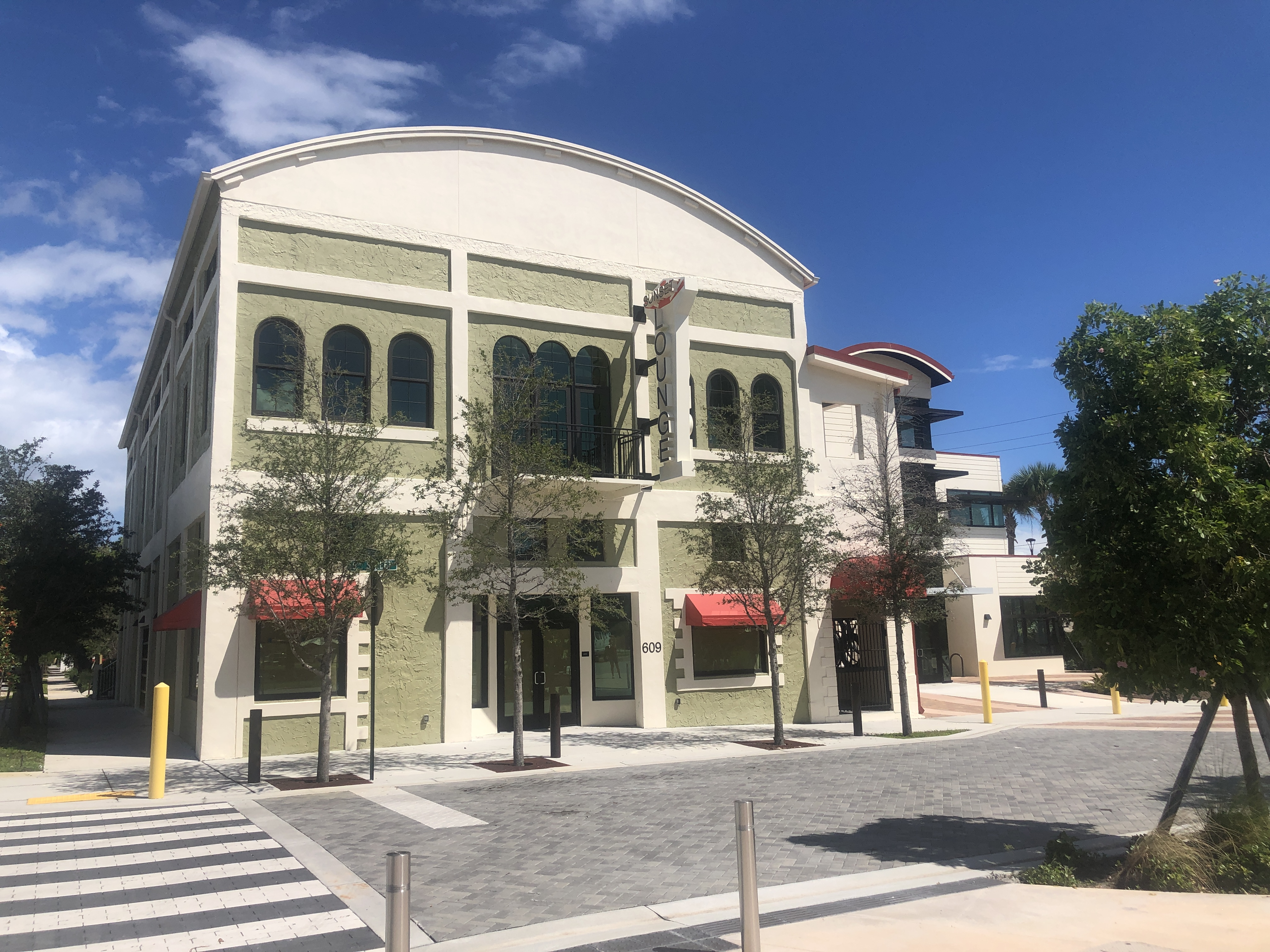

Sunset Lounge is an American historic music venue in West Palm Beach, Florida. It is in a section of the city that was once segregated. It is in the Northwest Historic District. It has been renovated and is set to reopen.

Performers included Louis Armstrong, Ella Fitzgerald, James Brown, Sam Cooke and Count Basie. A legal dispute between the city and company chosen to manage the venue delayed its reopening.

The venue is located in the city's historically black Northwest Neighborhood. It was acquired by the city's Community Redevelopment Agency (CRA) in 2015. It closed in 2018. The city spent $20 million acquiring and renovating the building, part of the city's efforts to revitalize the neighborhood under the direction of its mayor Keith W. James. Legal fees and delays have added additional costs.

== See also ==
- Chitlin' Circuit
