= Coalgate =

Several settlements have been named Coalgate:

- Commerce, Alberta, Canada, originally named Coalgate
- Coalgate, New Zealand
- Coalgate, Oklahoma, USA

Coalgate may also refer to:

- Indian coal mining controversy, a corruption scandal

== See also ==
- Colgate (disambiguation)
