= Mickens House =

Historic house in Florida, United States

- U.S. National Register of Historic Places
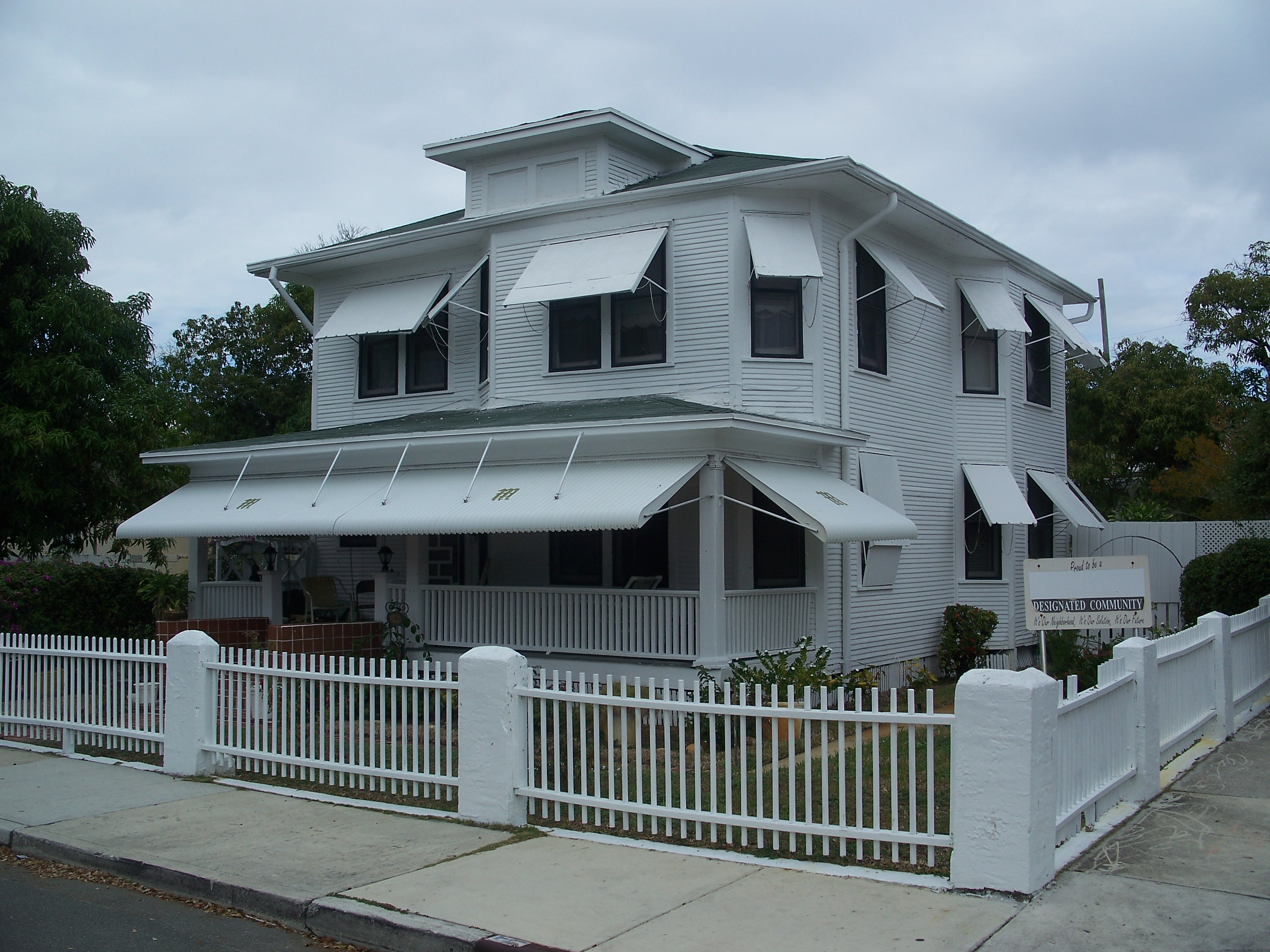

- Location within Florida Location within the United States
- Location: 801 4th Street, West Palm Beach, Florida
- Coordinates: 26°43′2″N 80°3′36″W
- Built: 1917
- Architectural style: Frame Vernacular
- NRHP reference No.: 85000769
- Added to NRHP: April 11, 1985

The Mickens House is a historic house in West Palm Beach, Florida. Constructed in 1917 at 801 Fourth Street, the dwelling, a two-story frame vernacular structure with many American Foursquare characteristics, is locally significant as one of the oldest surviving residences in the city and also notable for being owned by Haley and Alice Mickens and serving as a meeting place for individuals such as Louis Armstrong, Mary McLeod Bethune, Ralph Bunche, and A. Philip Randolph. On April 11, 1985, the Mickens House was added to the National Register of Historic Places and is also a contributing structure of the Northwest Historic District. As of 2026 it is undergoing renovation to become a bed and breakfast.

== Description and history ==
The house is named after Haley and Alice Mickens, the former working for Edward R. Bradley in the early 20th century and being a founder of West Palm Beach, Florida,'s Payne Chapel A.M.E. Church. After graduating from Spelman College, City College of New York, and North Carolina A&T State University, Mickens became "a pioneer in the field of education in the State of Florida and a ... powerful force in society in West Palm Beach," according to Alexander Green and Michael Zimny of the Florida Division of Archives. On November 19, 1917, Haley and Mickens married.

Sometime in 1917, Haley Mickens built a house at 801 Fourth Street, which he and Dr. Mickens lived in for the rest of their lives. He had previously built a one-story home at this address between 1902 and 1905, but it was moved to 502 Division Avenue in 1917. Architecturally, the two-story residence is of frame vernacular and American Foursquare-style. Distinguishing features include a front porch that spans the first floor of the main elevation and the awnings that shield each window opening and the porch. Local craftsman Thomas E. Wilkens, a friend of Haley, designed the ceilings. The ground floor contains a living room and dining room with an adjoining pantry; the second floor includes a bathroom, study, and three bedrooms.

The Mickens House was a meeting place for Black civil rights leaders, scholars, and entertainers, including Ralph Bunche, A. Philip Randolph, Mary McLeod Bethune, and Louis Armstrong. On April 11, 1985, the Mickens House was added to the National Register of Historic Places (NRHP). It is also a contributing property to the Northwest Historic District, which has also been listed on the NRHP since January 22, 1992. Green and Zimny stated that the dwelling is "significant in the areas of education and social and humanitarian services through its association with its long-time resident, Dr. Alice F. Mickens.", while it is also locally important due to being one of the oldest surviving residences in West Palm Beach.

By 2024, the Mickens House, along with some other properties in the Northwest Historic District, had been undergoing a revitalization project, with the community redevelopment agency contributing $5 million. The Mickens House is expected to become the Mickens Moore Bed & Breakfast. "Moore" refers to Alice Moore, who was one of Haley's and Mickens' several foster children and inherited the home and lived there until her death in 2014.

== See also ==
- National Register of Historic Places listings in Palm Beach County, Florida
