= Colgate Clock =

Colgate Clock may refer to:

- Colgate Clock (Indiana), located at a Colgate-Palmolive factory in Clarksville, Indiana and one of the largest clocks in the world
- Colgate Clock (Jersey City), an octagonal clock facing the Hudson River near Exchange Place in Jersey City, New Jersey
