= Samuel Colgate Jr. =

American football coach (1868–1902)

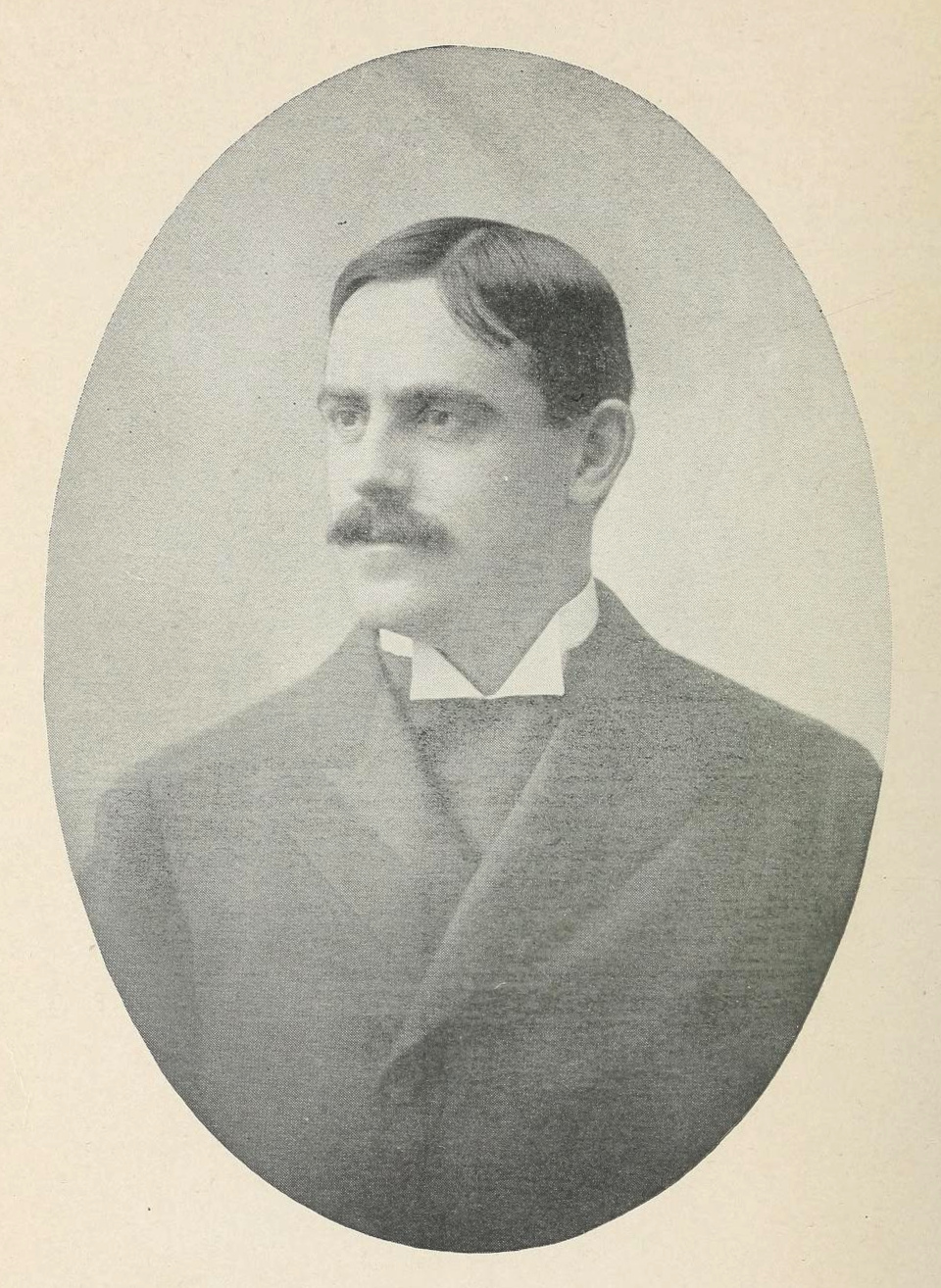

Biographical details
- Born: December 12, 1868; Norwich, Connecticut, U.S.
- Died: July 16, 1902 (aged 33); Seagate, New York, U.S.

Coaching career (HC unless noted)
- 1890–1891: Colgate

Head coaching record
- Overall: 5–2

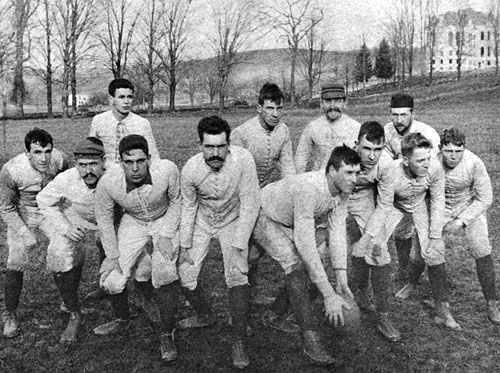
Colgate football team, 1890

Samuel Colgate Jr. (December 12, 1868 – July 16, 1902) was an American Presbyterian pastor and college football coach. He graduated from Yale University in 1891 and then entered the Theological Seminary at Colgate University. He was the first head football coach at Colgate and he held that position for two seasons, from 1890 until 1891 (some sources and photos say "until 1892"). His record at Colgate was 5–2.

The team of 1892, which may have been coached by Preston Smith, ended the season undefeated with a 3–0 record. The 1892 team was the first in Colgate history to go undefeated, with victories over Hamilton, Rochester, and St. John's Academy. Colgate was reported to be "more of a manager than the iron hand running the team."

Colgate was the son of business magnate Samuel Colgate, who along with his brother James Boorman Colgate were responsible for a significant amount of financial support to Colgate (formerly Madison) University. In 1890 the school was renamed in honor of the Colgate family.

== Head coaching record ==
Year	Team	Overall	Conference	Standing	Bowl/playoffs
Colgate (Independent) (1890–1891)
1890	Colgate	1–1			
1891	Colgate	4–1			
Colgate:		5–2			
Total:		5–2			
