= William Colgate =

Business magnate

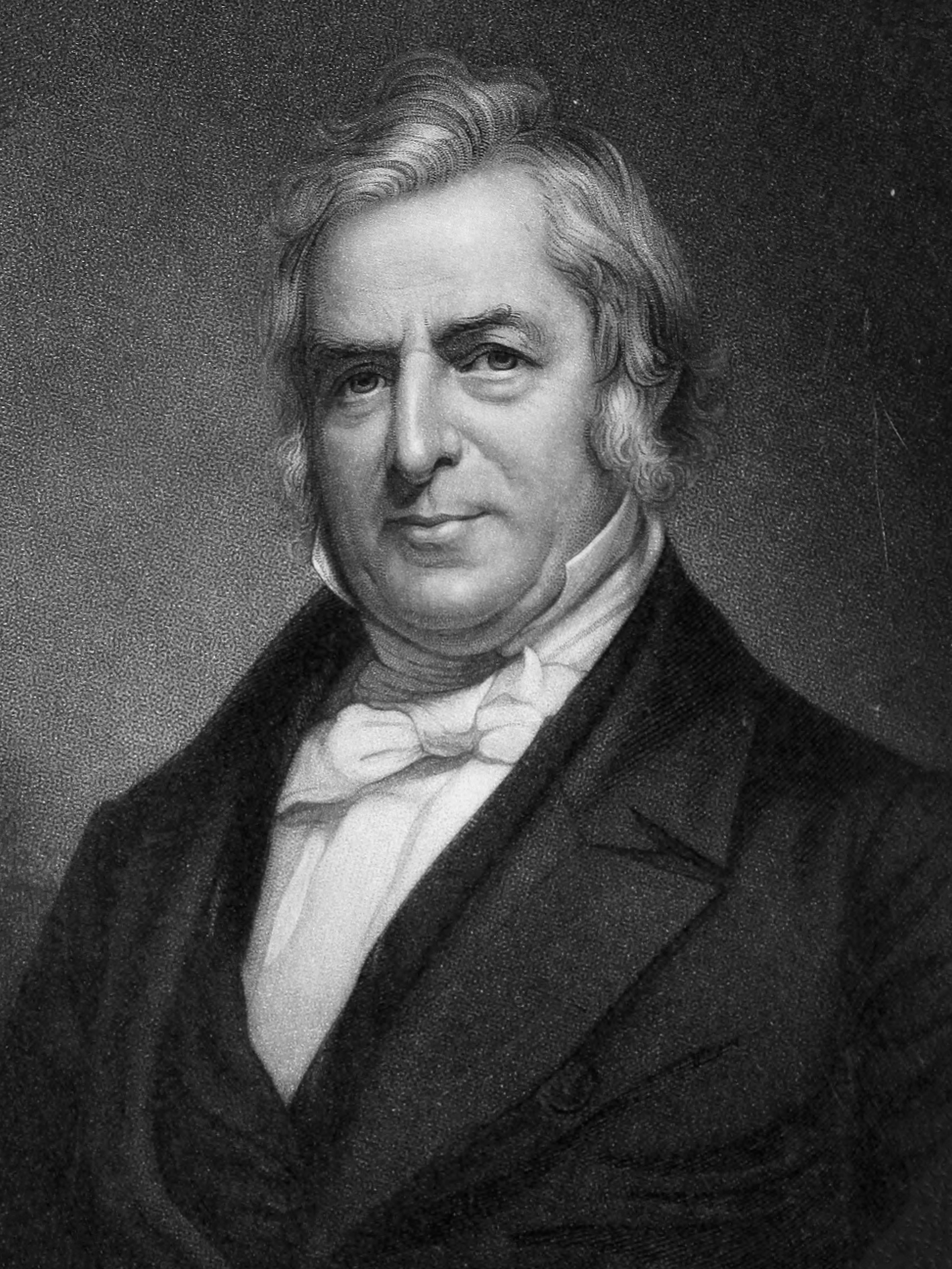
- A depiction of Colgate in his later years, drawn in 1881
- Born: January 25, 1783; Hollingbourne, Kent, England
- Died: March 25, 1857 (aged 74); New York City, U.S.
- Resting place: Green-Wood Cemetery, Brooklyn, New York City
- Citizenship: Naturalized American
- Occupations: Business magnate, Philanthropist, Baptist deacon
- Known for: Founded Colgate-Palmolive company
- Spouse: Mary Gilbert (married 1811)
- Children: 9, including James and Samuel

Signature
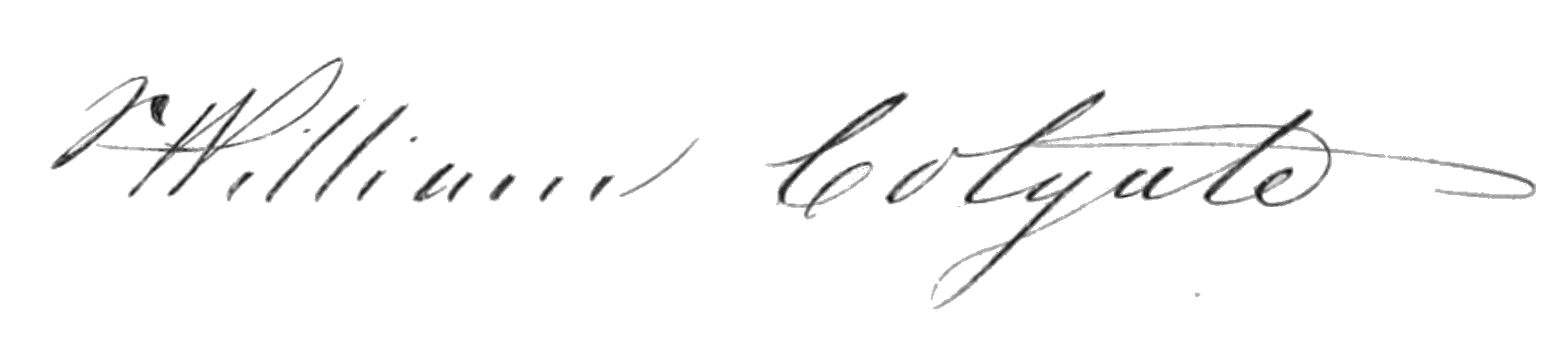

William Colgate (January 25, 1783 – March 25, 1857) was an English-American industrialist who in 1806 founded what became the Colgate-Palmolive company.

== Early life ==
William Colgate was born in Hollingbourne, Kent, England, on January 25, 1783, He was the son of Robert Colgate (1758–1826), a farmer and politician, and his wife Sarah (née Bowles). The family moved to a farm near Shoreham when William was six years old.

His father was a sympathizer with both the American and French Revolutions, whose republican ideals impelled him to leave their farm in March 1798 and emigrate to Baltimore, Maryland, in the United States, after which the family settled on a farm in Harford County. Robert formed a partnership with Ralph Maher to manufacture soap and candles, and teenage William helped out, but the partnership dissolved after two years. The family later settled in Delaware County, New York.

== Career ==
William Colgate went to New York City in 1804 and began work as an apprentice in a soap-boiler. Observing what he regarded as mismanagement, he learned valuable lessons to apply to a business of his own. At the close of his apprenticeship he wrote to dealers in other cities seeking to establish himself with them. In 1806 William set up a starch, soap and candle business on Dutch Street in Manhattan. In 1820, he opened a starch factory across the Hudson in Jersey City. He went on to become one of the most prosperous men in New York City, sought for his wise counsel and ready to offer aid to others in practical enterprises. Through this he gained wide influence, especially among those of his faith.

== Personal life ==
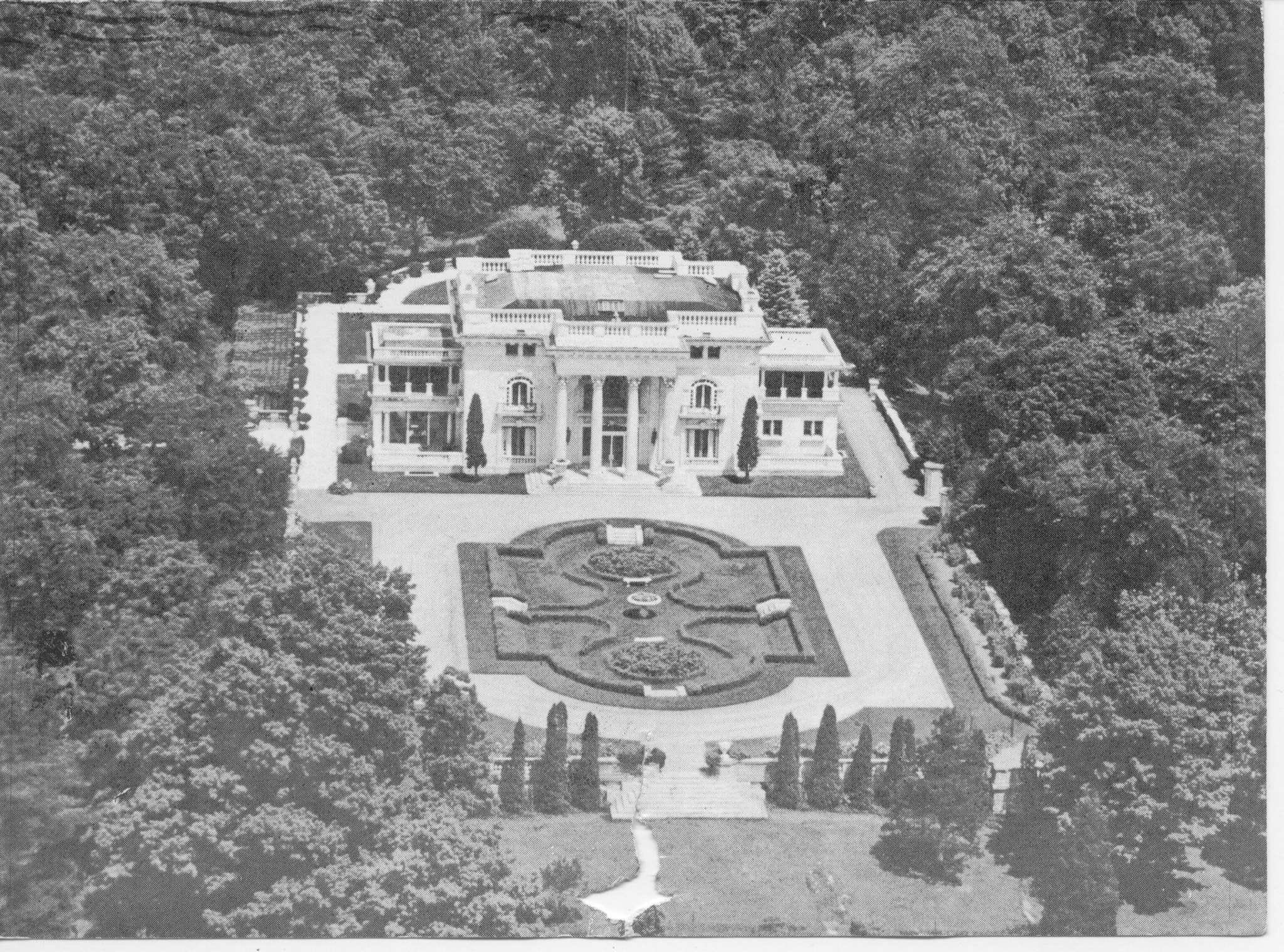
R. R. Colgate mansion, Sharon, Connecticut

The Rev. William Parkinson, pastor of the First Baptist Church in the City of New York, baptized the twenty-three-year-old Colgate in February 1808, who then became a deacon. In 1811 he moved to Oliver Street Baptist Church. In 1838, he became a member of the Tabernacle Baptist Church, to the erection of which he had himself largely contributed. Colgate was an active contributor to religious causes through his career.

=== Family ===
Colgate married Mary Gilbert (1788–1855) on April 23, 1810, and they had nine children: Robert (1812–1885), Gilbert (1814–1838), Sarah (1816–1859), James (1818–1904), William III (1820–1838), Samuel (1822–1897), Mary IV (1826–1873), Joseph (1828–1865), and Martha (1831–1837). His son Robert purchased Stonehurst at Riverdale-on-Hudson in the Bronx about 1859 shortly after it was built; it was listed on the National Register of Historic Places in 1983. Robert's son, Romulus Riggs Colgate, built the Colgate Mansion in Sharon, Connecticut.

== Philanthropy ==
Colgate annually subscribed money to assist in defraying the expenses of Hamilton Literary and Theological Institution (later Madison University and Theological Seminary); and he was among the most strenuous opponents of their removal to the city of Rochester. His sons James and Samuel were both benefactors of Madison University and Theological Seminary. After seven decades of the Colgates' involvement, the school was renamed Colgate University in 1890.

Colgate was a regular contributor to the funds of the Baptist Missionary Union, and took upon himself the entire support of a foreign missionary.

== Archives and records ==
- William Colgate and Company records at Baker Library Special Collections, Harvard Business School.
