= Kevin McCarthy (historian) =

American historian (b. 1940)

Kevin M. McCarthy (born 1940) is an American historian, professor and author. He was born in Gainesville, Florida and returned to live and work there as a professor at the University of Florida. He received the Charlton Tebeau Award (Charlton Tebeau) from the Florida Historical Society in 1994 for African Americans in Florida: An Illustrated History and the Patrick Smith Literary Prize (Patrick Smith) from Library of the Florida Historical Society in 1999 for A River in Flood and Other Florida Stories by Marjory Stoneman Douglas.

He has written books about various aspects of Florida's history including the history of African Americans in Florida, He has also written about baseball and football in Florida.

== Books ==
- Florida Stories (1989)
- McCarthy, Kevin M. (1990). Florida Lighthouses. University of Florida Press. ISBN 978-0-8130-0993-3.
- The Book Lover’s Guide to Florida (1992)
- Thirty Florida Shipwrecks (1992)
- African Americans in Florida (1993)
- The Gators and the Seminoles (1993)
- Twenty Florida Pirates (1994)
- Baseball in Florida (1996)
- Guide to the University of Florida and Gainesville (1997)
- Native Americans in Florida (1999)
- Christmas in Florida (2000)
- Aviation in Florida (2003)
- African American Sites in Florida (2007)
- Cedar Key, Florida (2007)
- The Autobiography of Kevin M. McCarthy (2015)
- Black Florida
- Caloosahatchee River Guidebook
- Suwanee River Guidebook
- St. Johns River Guidebook
- Castles of Turkey
- Fightin' Gators: A History of the University of Florida Football and aviation.
