= Samuel Colgate =

American manufacturer and philanthropist (1822–1897)

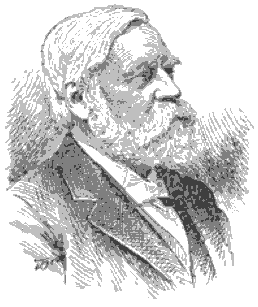
- Born: March 22, 1822; New York City, New York
- Died: April 23, 1897 (aged 75); Orange, New Jersey
- Burial place: Rosedale Cemetery, New Jersey
- Occupations: Manufacturer and philanthropist
- Organizations: Colgate University; New York Baptist Education Society; Society for the Suppression of Vice; American Baptist Missionary Union; American Tract Society
- Spouse: Elizabeth Ann Morse (1829–1891)
- Children: Richard Morse Colgate (1854–1919); Gilbert Colgate (1858–1933); Bessie Colgate (1860–1860); Sidney Morse Colgate (1862–1930); Austen Morse Colgate (1863–1927); Samuel Colgate, Jr. (1868–1902); Russel Colgate (1873–1941)
- Parents: William Colgate (father); Mary Gilbert (mother)
- Relatives: Robert Lane Colby (brother-in-law)
- Family: Mary Colby (sister); James Boorman Colgate (brother); Robert Colgate (brother)

Samuel Colgate (March 22, 1822 – April 23, 1897), son of William Colgate, was an American manufacturer and philanthropist, born in New York City. When William Colgate died in 1857, Samuel took over the business (he did not want to continue the business but thought it would be the right thing to do), reorganizing it as Colgate & Company. In 1872, Samuel introduced Cashmere Bouquet, the world’s first milled perfumed toilet soap. Then in 1873, Colgate introduced its first Colgate Toothpaste, an aromatic toothpaste sold in jars. In 1896, the company sold its first toothpaste in a collapsible tube (which had recently been invented by dentist Washington Sheffield), named Colgate Ribbon Dental Cream. Also in 1896, Colgate hired Martin Ittner and under his direction founded one of the first applied research labs. The manufactory he built in Jersey City developed into one of the largest establishments of its kind in the world and is now part of Colgate-Palmolive.

He was also prominent in philanthropic work. For more than 30 years he was trustee of Colgate University.He was president of the New York Baptist Education Society, and president of the Society for the Suppression of Vice, to which he was a friend and ally of Anthony Comstock.

He was also a member of the executive committee of the American Baptist Missionary Union and of the American Tract Society. One of his most noteworthy achievements was the collection of 30,000 volumes of reports (now at the American Baptist Historical Society), comprising the documentary records of the Baptist denomination.

Colgate built a home in Orange, New Jersey, where he died on April 23, 1897, due to heart issues. He is interred in Orange's Rosedale Cemetery.

== Colgate University ==
Conjointly with his brother, James Boorman Colgate, he gave large sums to Colgate University, which in 1890 was named in honor of the Colgate family. His son, Samuel Colgate, Jr. became the first head football coach at the school.

- Samuel Colgate was ranked to manager of Colgate soap and perfumes after the death of his father, William Colgate, owner of the company. later, Samuel Colgate renamed the company "Colgate and Co."
