= Colegate =

Colegate is a surname. Notable people with the surname include:

- Arthur Colegate (1884–1956), British politician
- Isabel Colegate (1931–2023), English writer and literary agent

== See also ==
- St George's Church, Colegate, Norwich, England
