= Alice Mickens =

American civil rights leader

Alice Frederick Mickens was a civil rights leader and philanthropist in West Palm Beach.

== Early life and education ==
Mickens was born in Bartow, Florida to formerly enslaved people from South Carolina. Her family moved to West Palm Beach when she was young.

She graduated with honors from Spelman College.

== Mickens House ==
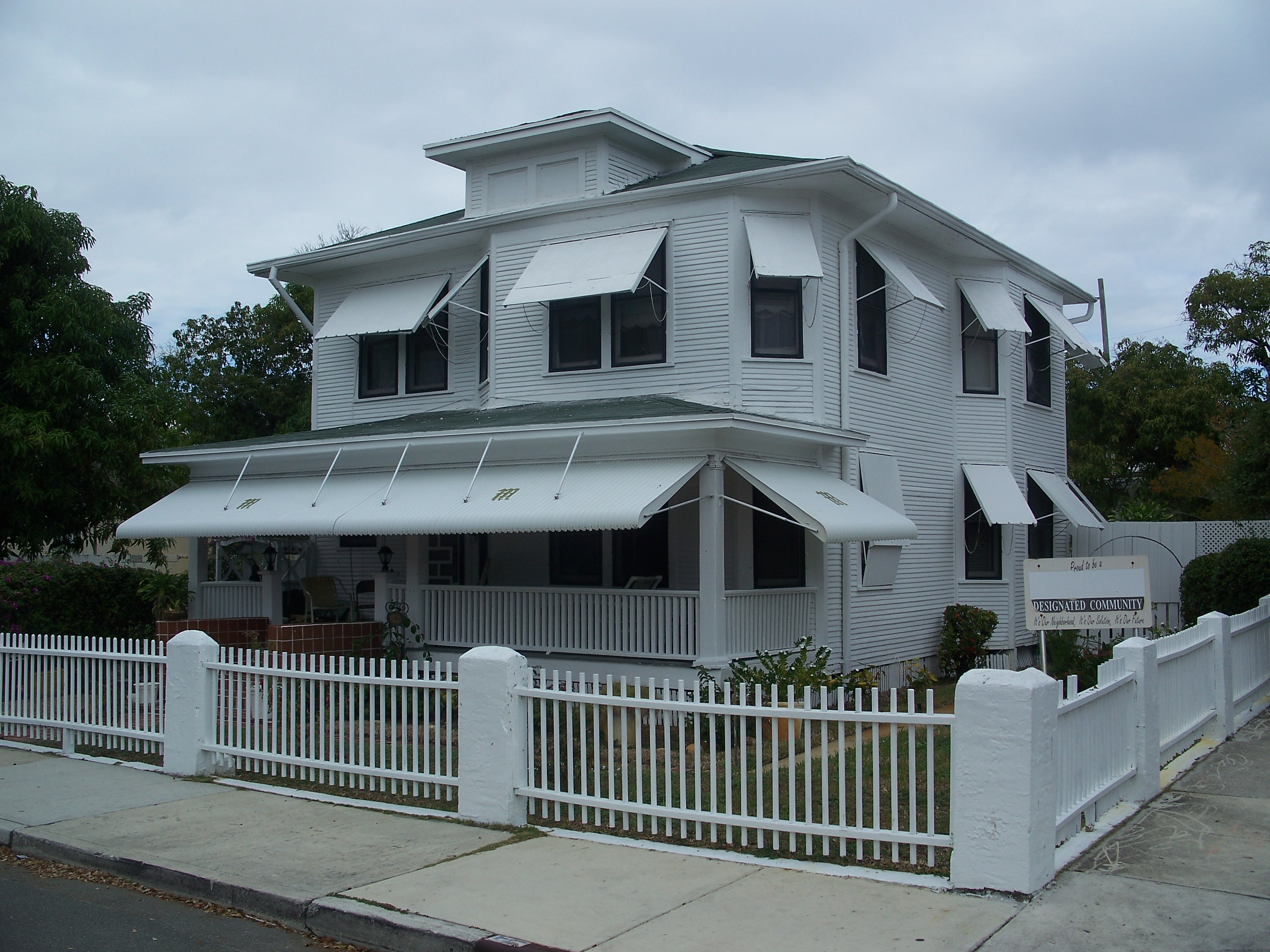
The Mickens House, built by Haley Mickens.

In 1917 Mickens and her husband, Haley Mickens, moved into a two-story home they had built at 801 4th Street.

Mickens hosted influential black civil rights leaders, scholars, entertainers and other notable figures at the house, including Ralph Bunche, A. Philip Randolph, Mary McLeod Bethune, and Louis Armstrong. The Mickens hosted afternoon garden parties for professional baseball players in the Negro Baseball League when they were practicing nearby. Black entertainers and scholars who could not stay in local hotels stayed in the Mickens' rooming house across the street from their home.

Alice and Haley adopted several foster children, including Alice Moore.

Mickens was a trustee of Bethune-Cookman College and received an honorary doctorate from the school.

== Death and legacy ==
Mickens died in her home on January 19, 1988, at age 99. A science hall at Bethune-Cookman and a park in West Palm Beach are named after her.

As a result of advocacy by Alice Moore, a foster child of the Mickens, the Mickens House was listed in the National Register of Historic Places.
