= Colgate Clock (Indiana) =

Coordinates: 38.274685°N 85.752863°W

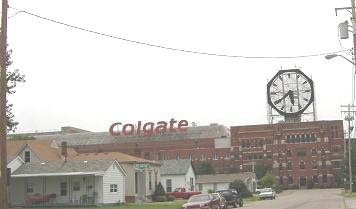
- Colgate-Palmolive factory, with the original Colgate Clock, in Clarksville, Indiana
- Interactive map of Colgate Clock
- Location: Clarksville, Indiana

History
- Built: 1924
- Built for: Residents of Clarksville, Indiana
- Original use: Telling Time

Site notes
- Owner: Colgate-Palmolive (1924-2008); Unknown (2008-present)

The Colgate Clock, located at a former Colgate-Palmolive factory in Clarksville, Indiana, is one of the largest clocks in the world. It has a diameter of 40 feet (12 meters). It was first illuminated in Clarksville on November 17, 1924. It is located directly across the Ohio River from Louisville, Kentucky.

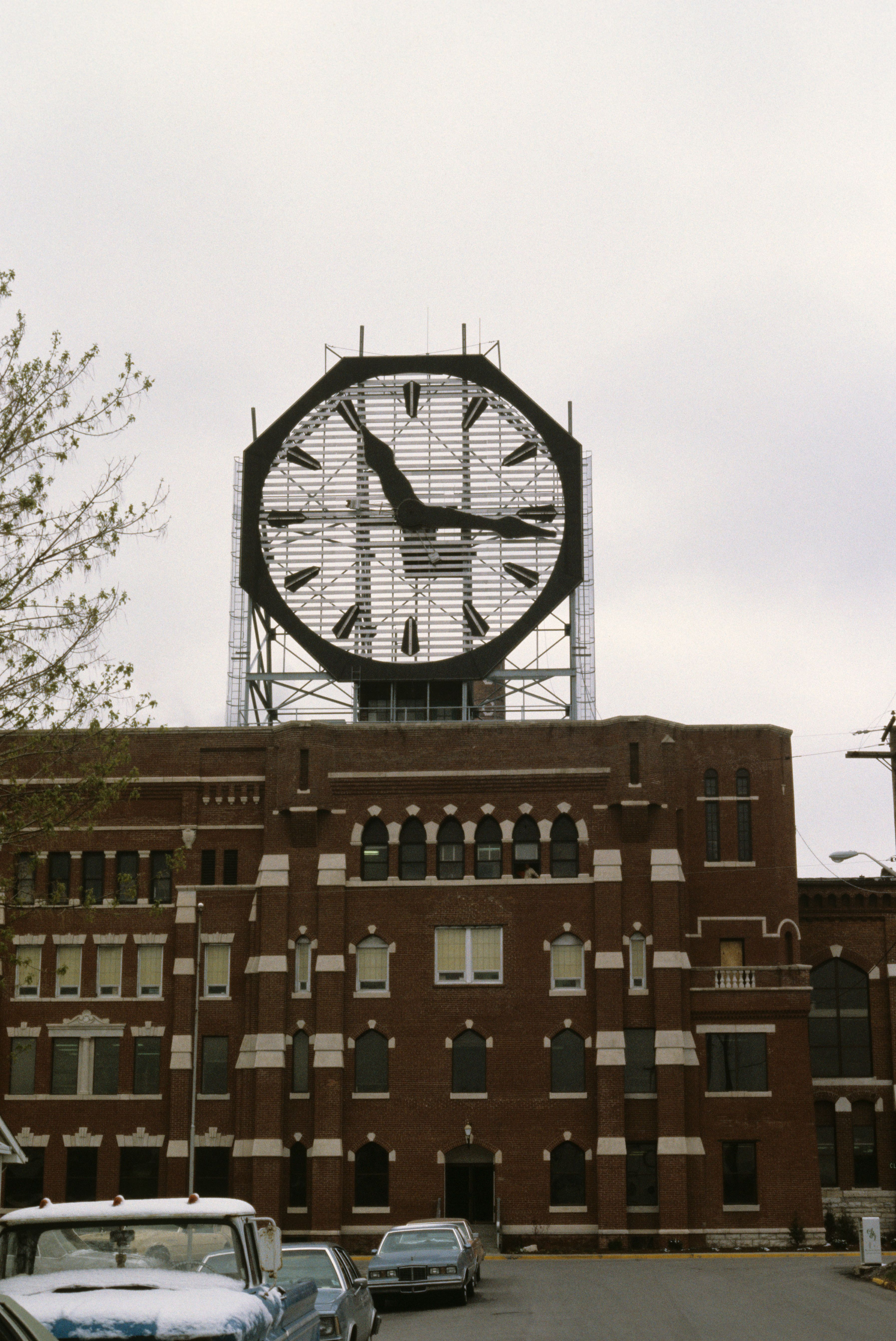
Colgate Clock photographed in 1982.

== History ==
Before the building was bought by Colgate, it served as the Indiana Reformatory South. It opened in 1847, replacing the state prison which had opened in Jeffersonville in 1821. In 1919 a fire broke out in the prison, causing extensive damage that would have been very expensive to repair. Instead, the state of Indiana decided to relocate the prison to Pendleton, Indiana. Colgate happened to be looking for a Midwestern location following the post-World War I boom, and heard of the prison's availability. The state sold the prison to Colgate in 1923. Prisoners, through forced labor, converted the carceral facility to a soap-making plant, and were imprisoned in cells at the location while the conversion took place.

The clock was designed by Colgate engineer Warren Davey and constructed by the Seth Thomas Clock Company for the centennial of the Colgate Company in 1906. It was installed at Colgate-Palmolive facilities in Jersey City, New Jersey, and then moved to Indiana when a larger clock replaced it in 1924.

== Endangered status ==
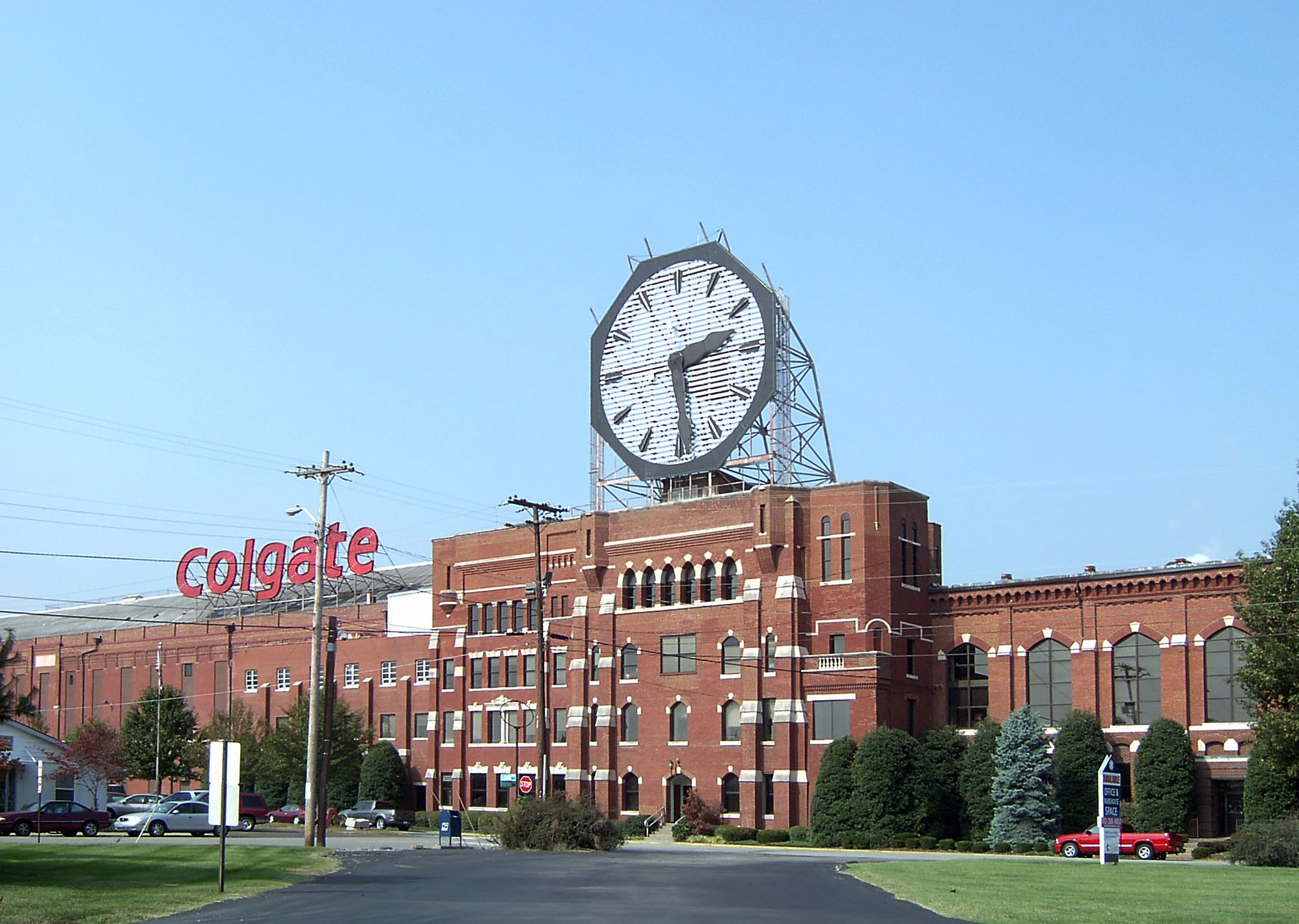
Colgate-Palmolive Plant and Clock photographed in 2006.

In 2006 the factory was placed on Historic Landmarks Foundation of Indiana's 10 Most Endangered Landmarks list. Colgate-Palmolive planned to close it in 2008, moving its operations to Tennessee and Mexico, and the site is in a choice area for developers, as it is just across the river from Louisville, with easy access to I-65. Colgate has not made any plans for the preservation of the clock. On February 13, 2007, the factory was again on the endangered list. Colgate refused an offer to put the factory on the National Register of Historic Places, which would mean funds from the Indiana Department of Transportation due to the Ohio River Bridges Project.

== See also ==
- Colgate Clock (New Jersey)
- List of attractions and events in the Louisville metropolitan area
