= Tabernacle Baptist Church (Manhattan) =

Baptist church building in New York City

Coordinates: 40.730°N 73.986°W

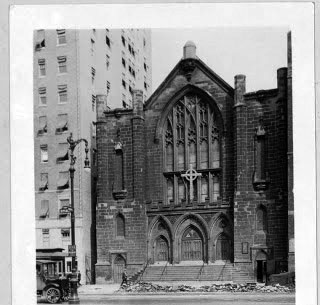
- The Second Avenue Baptist Tabernacle (1850)

- Location within New York Location within the United States
- Location: New York City

History
- Built: 1850
- Rebuilt: 1930

Site notes
- Area: less than one acre
- Architect: Henry Kaufman
- Architectural style: Gothic
- Owner: Urban Outfitters

Tabernacle Baptist Church (also known as 'Baptist Tabernacle') was a church in Manhattan, New York City. It had its first home on Mulberry Street, Lower East Side, in 1839 supported by members of the Mulberry-Street Church. The Church played an important role in the 1940s, as it was home to Italian, Polish, and Russian Baptist congregations.

== History ==
On Rev. Edward Lathrop presided over the Baptist Tabernacle Church on Mulberry Street until December 22, 1850, when the Baptist Tabernacle Church moved to a new building on 166 Second Avenue, between 10th and 11th Street in East Village, Manhattan.

In 1896, a New York Times article talks about the foreclosure of the property. “A Baptist Church Sold – Another of the Troubles of the Second Avenue Tabernacle Society.” It goes on to say that “At one time this church was one of the wealthiest Baptist societies in the United States. It has a large and rich congregation and did not want for money. But when the tide of fashion drifted up town, and the character of that part of the city about Second Avenue and Stuyvesant Place changed, the rich members began to drop away, and those who remained and the new recruits were less able to maintain their expensive property."

From 1928–30, on the site of the previous Tabernacle Church on Second Avenue, the Baptist Tabernacle Church was demolished and rebuilt as a "skyscraper church" for the Baptist Tabernacle. Henry Kaufman developed the fifteen-story Warren Hall, which incorporated a new home for the Baptist Tabernacle, at 162-168 Second Avenue (northeast corner of Tenth Street), designed by Emery Roth.

The Church played an important role in the 1940s, as home to Italian, Polish, and Russian Baptist congregations. Today, the words BAPTIST TABERNACLE can be still be seen over the doorway at Warren Hall on 168 Second Avenue. The property is now owned by the Urban Outfitters store.
