= James Boorman Colgate =

American businessman (1818-1904)

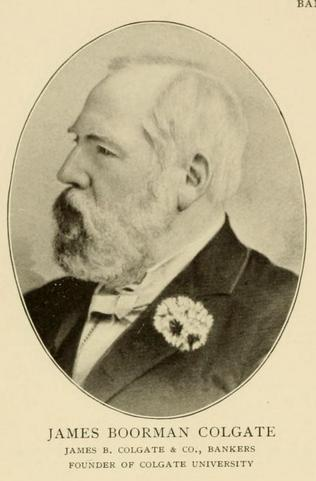
- Born: March 4, 1818; New York City, New York, U.S.
- Died: February 7, 1904 (aged 85); Brooklyn, New York, U.S.
- Occupation: Financier
- Spouse(s): S. Ellen Hoyt (1844 - 1846); Susan Farnum Colby (married 1851)
- Children: With S. Ellen Hoyt: William Hoyt Colgate; With Susan Farnum Colby: Mary Colgate; James Colby Colgate
- Parents: William Colgate (father); Mary Gilbert (mother)
- Relatives: Robert Lane Colby (Brother-In-Law); Gov. Anthony Colby (Father-In-Law)
- Family: Mary Colby (Sister); Samuel Colgate (Brother); Robert Colgate (Brother)

James Boorman Colgate (March 4, 1818 – February 7, 1904), son of William Colgate and Mary Gilbert, was an American financier and member of the Colgate family, founders of the Colgate-Palmolive conglomerate.

== Biography ==
He was born in New York City and received his first training in the house of Boorman, Johnston, and Company. In 1852, he formed a partnership with Wall Street pioneer John Bond Trevor of the Glenview Mansion, and opened the banking house of Trevor and Colgate; this company dealt in stocks, securities and precious metals and regulated a large portion of the gold and paper exchange during the Civil War.

He was one of the founders of the New York Gold Exchange and was for several years its president. In 1873, the firm changed its name to J. B. Colgate and Company. His extensive loans to the federal government during the financial crisis of 1873 contributed materially to the reestablishment of confidence both in the United States and the markets of Europe. As a trustee of Colgate (formerly Madison) University, he for 30 years made almost annual donations to that institution, the development of which is due chiefly to his constant care and valuable advice.

Colgate is also the namesake for the town of Colgate, a small unincorporated community in Steele County, North Dakota, founded in 1882. Colgate was the county's largest landowner, with 5,000 acres (20 km^{2}) that he purchased from the Northern Pacific Railroad in 1880.

== Personal life ==
In 1844, Colgate married S. Ellen Hoyt of Utica, N.Y., by whom he had one son, William Hoyt Colgate. Ellen died in 1846 and on February 19, 1851, he remarried to Susan Farnum Colby, daughter of Gov. Anthony Colby and Mary Messinger Everett of New London, N.H. His children by the second marriage were Mary (1857–1936) and James Colby Colgate (1863–1944).
