= Tabernacle Baptist Church (West Palm Beach) =

Church in West Palm Beach, Florida, United States

Coordinates: 26°43′15.5″N 80°3′34.5″W

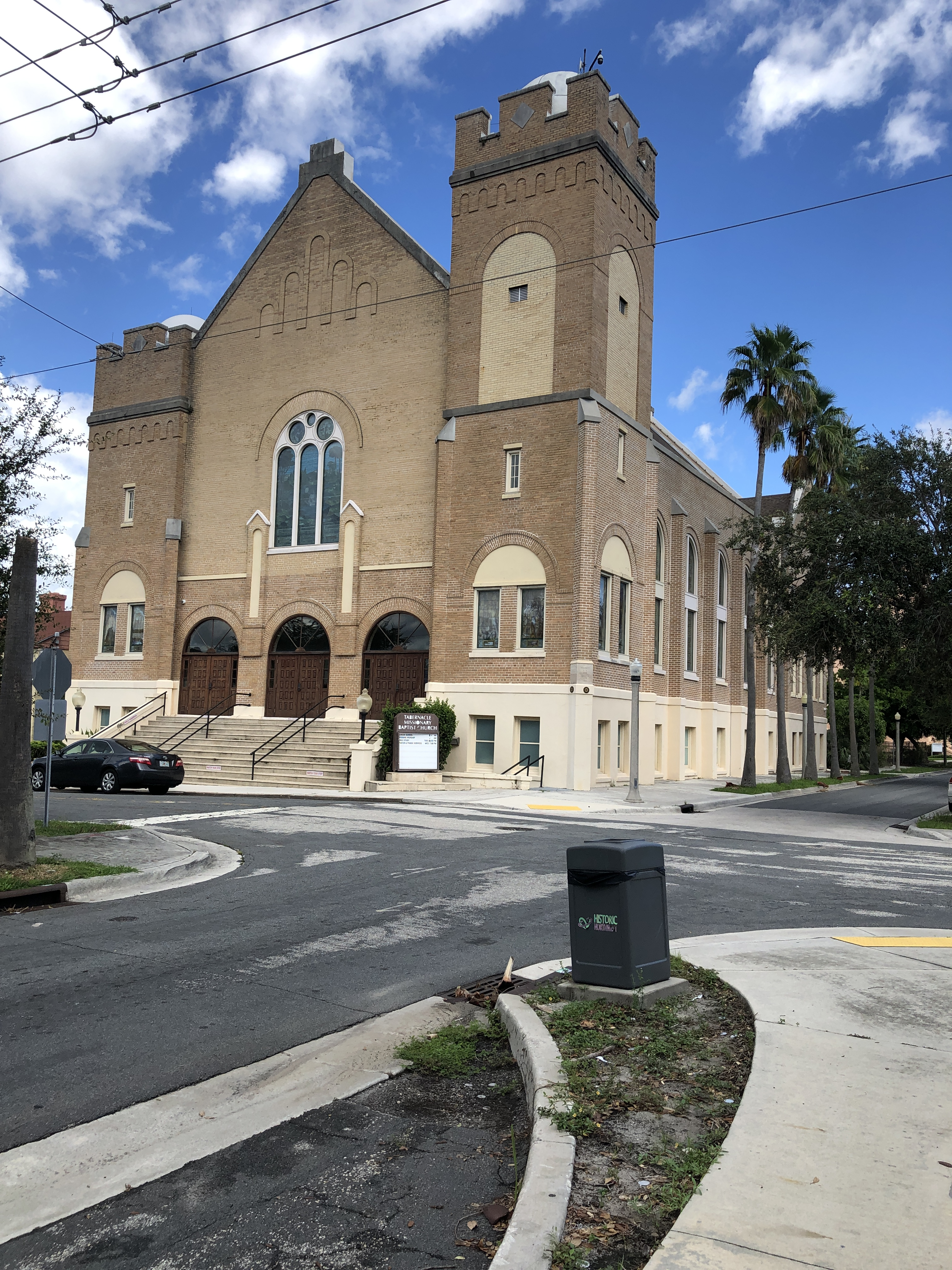
Tabernacle Baptist Church

The Tabernacle Baptist Church is located at 801 8th Street, West Palm Beach, Florida. It was founded in 1893 as Mount Olive Baptist Church. From 1894 to 1896, it housed the first public school for blacks in Palm Beach County. The current building was built in 1925 in the neo-Romanesque Revival style.
