= List of African-American historic places in Florida =

This list of African American Historic Places in Florida is based on a book by the National Park Service, The Preservation Press, the National Trust for Historic Preservation, and the National Conference of State Historic Preservation Officers.

For the National List of African American Historic Places use this link.

Contents: Counties in Florida with African American Historic Places
Alachua - Baker - Duval - Escambia - Franklin - Lee - Leon - Miami-Dade - Monroe - Putnam - St. Johns - St. Lucie - Santa Rosa - Seminole - Volusia

Some of these sites are on the National Register of Historic Places (NR) as independent sites or as part of larger historic district. Several of the sites are National Historic Landmarks (NRL). Others have Florida historical markers (HM). The citation on historical markers is given in the reference. The location listed is the nearest community to the site. More precise locations are given in the reference.

== Alachua County ==
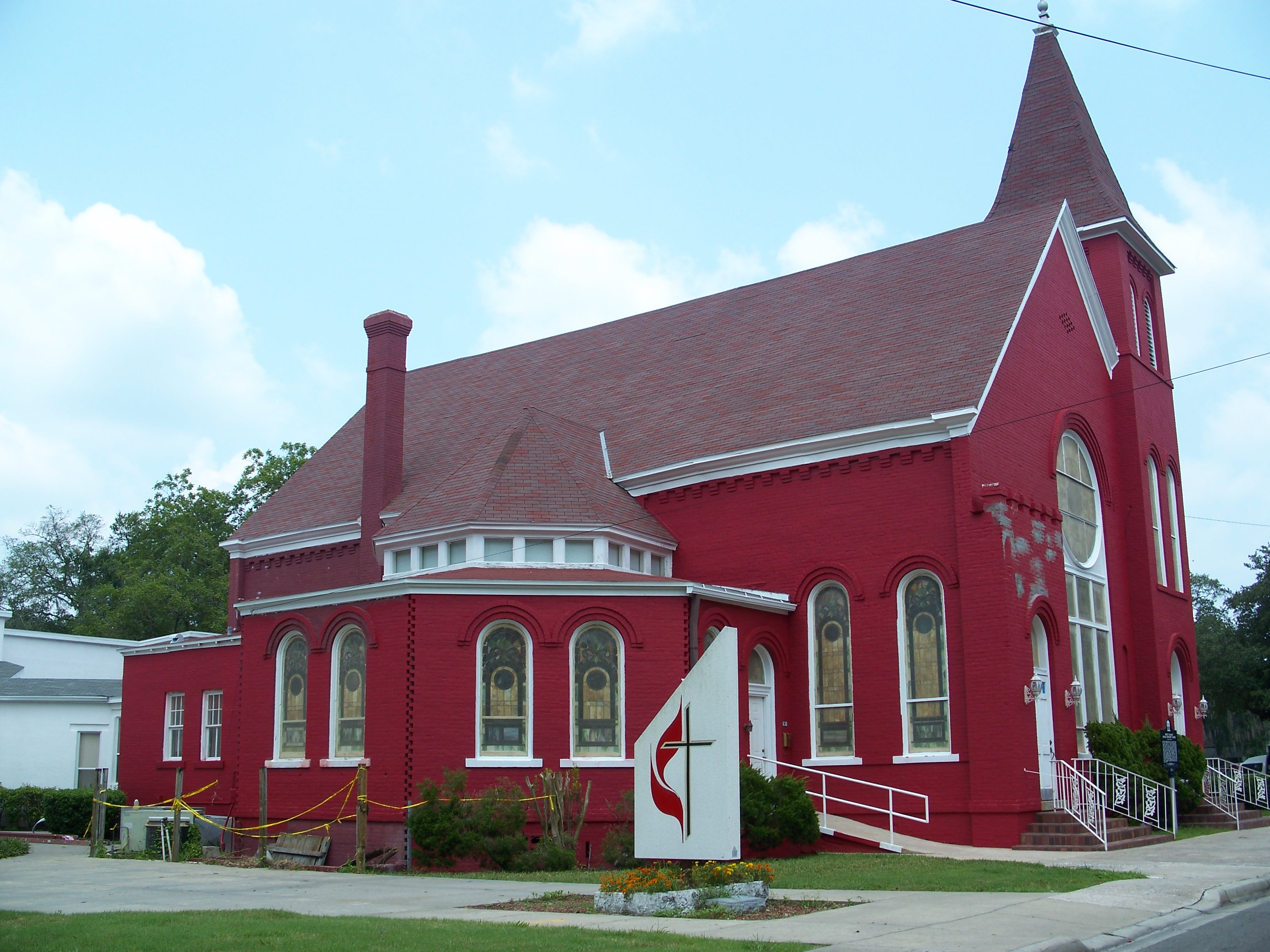
Methodist church in the Pleasant Street Historic District

- Gainesville
  - Liberty Hill Schoolhouse
  - Pleasant Street Historic District

== Baker County ==
- Olustee
  - Olustee Battlefield

== Broward County ==
- Fort Lauderdale
  - Old Dillard High School
  - Woodlawn Cemetery (Fort Lauderdale)

== Clay County ==
- Orange Park
  - Joseph Green House
  - Orange Park Negro Elementary School

== Duval County ==
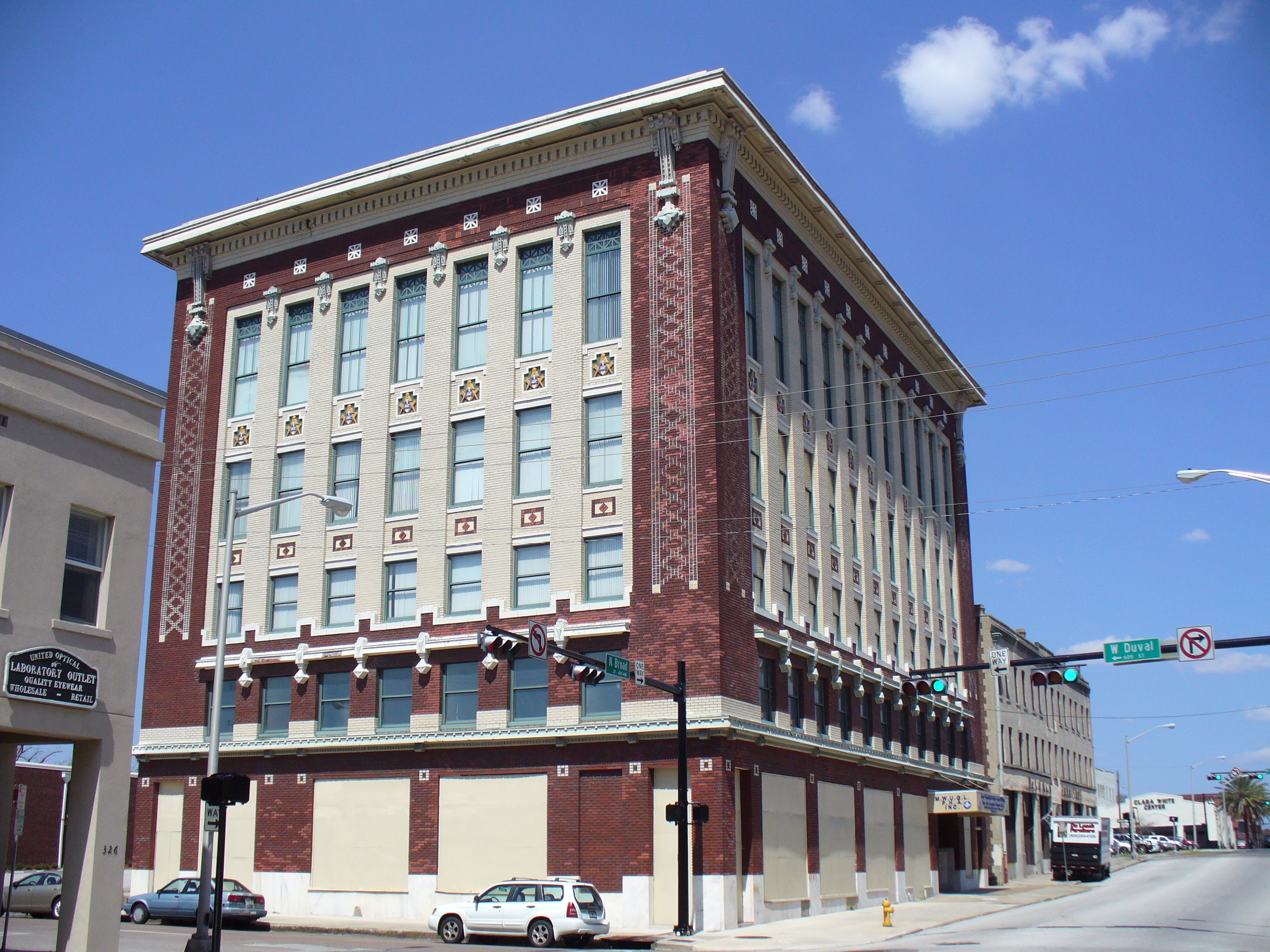
Masonic Temple

- Jacksonville
  - Bethel Baptist Institutional Church,
  - Brewster Hospital,
  - Catherine Street Fire Station,
  - Centennial Hall-Edward Waters College,
  - Edwin M. Stanton School,
  - Kingsley Plantation,
  - Masonic Temple,
  - Mount Zion AME Church,

== Escambia County ==
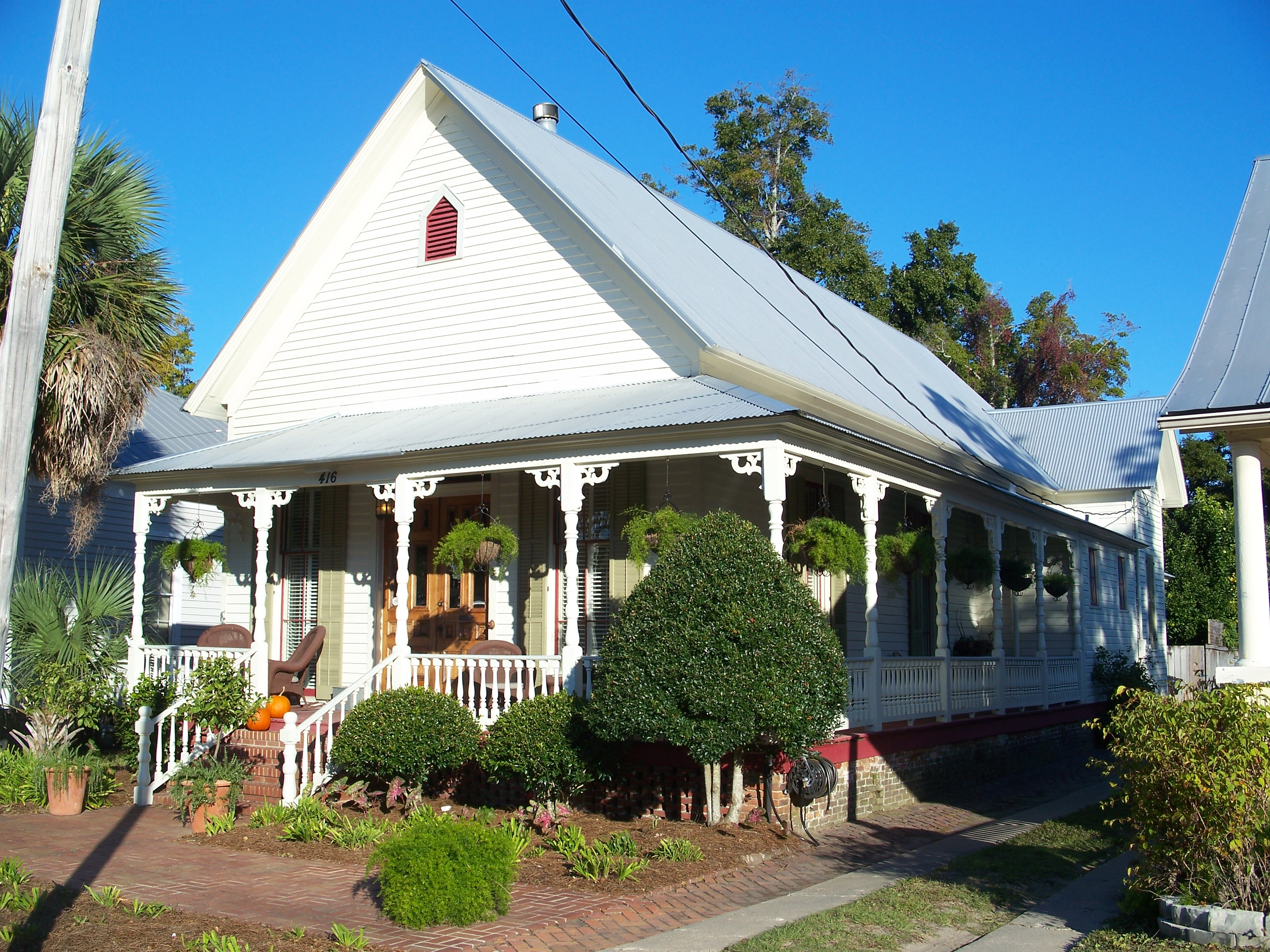
St. Michael's Creole Benevolent Association Hall

- Pensacola
  - James House
  - St. Michael's Creole Benevolent Association Hall

== Franklin County ==
- Sumatra
  - Negro Fort

== Hillsborough County, Florida ==
- Tampa
  - Jackson Rooming House
  - Meacham Elementary School
  - St. Peter Claver Catholic School

== Lee County ==
- Fort Myers
  - Paul Laurence Dunbar School
- Sanibel
  - Sanibel Colored School

== Leon County ==
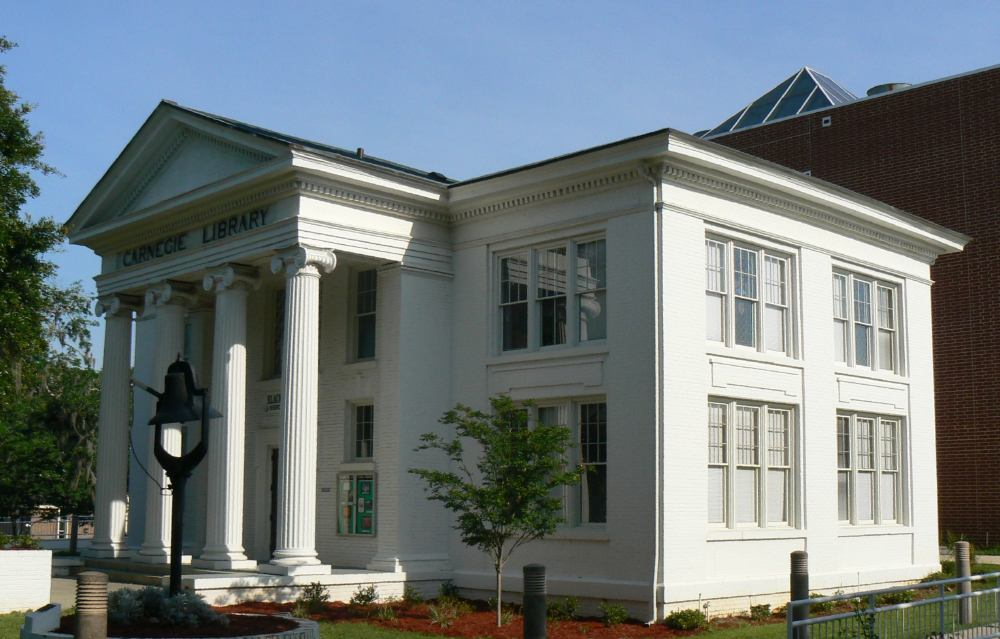
Carnegie Library at FAMU, Southeastern Regional Black Archives Research Center and Museum

- Tallahassee
  - Carnegie Library at FAMU
  - Foote-Hilyer Administration Building (former Florida A&M Hospital)
  - John Gilmore Riley House
  - Old Lincoln High School
  - Union Bank

== Manatee County ==
- Bradenton
  - Family Heritage House Museum State College of Florida, Manatee-Sarasota

== Marion County ==
- Ocala
  - Fessenden Academy
  - Mount Zion A.M.E. Church

== Miami-Dade County ==
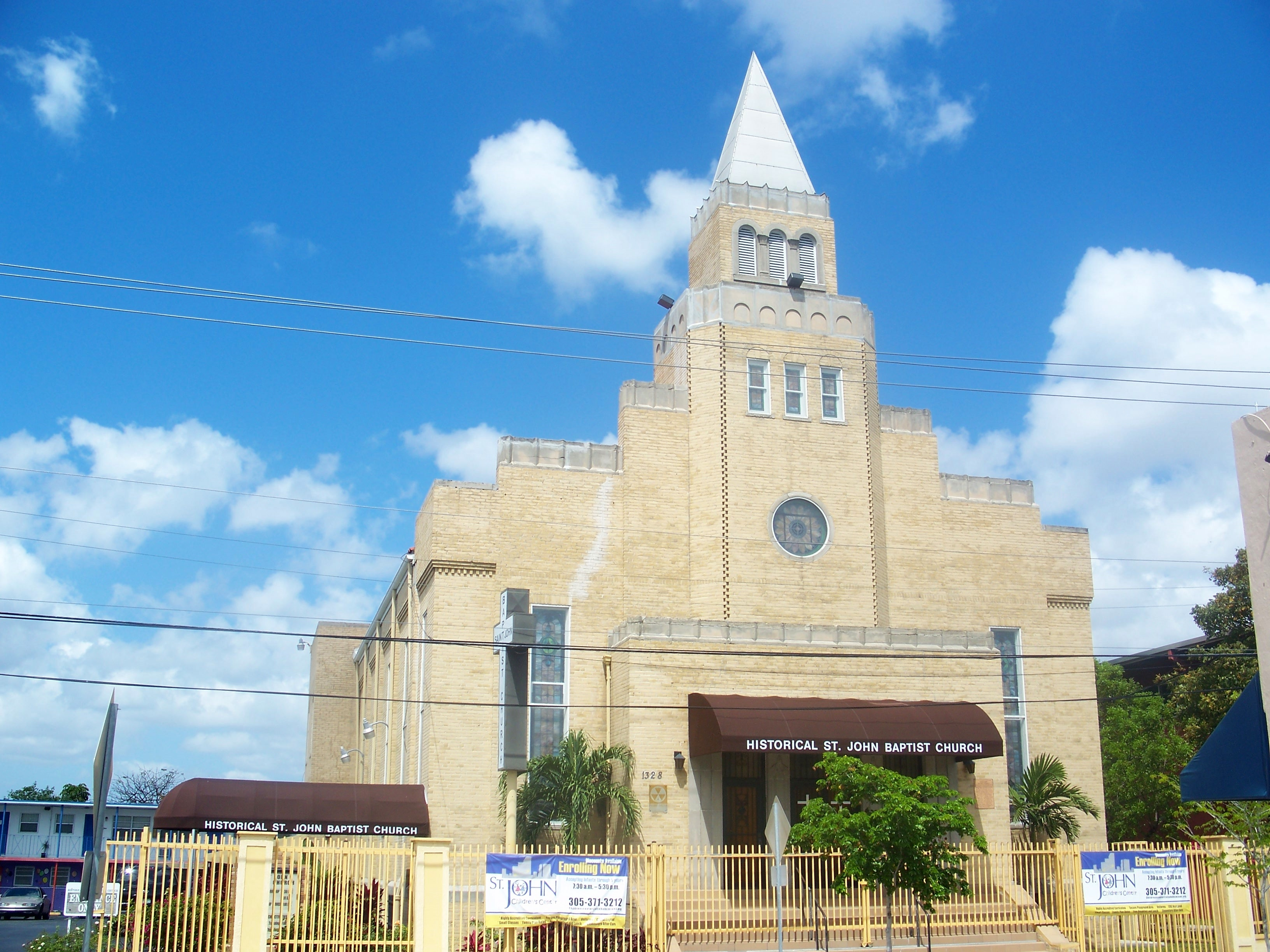
St. John's Baptist Church

- Miami
  - D. A. Dorsey House
  - Greater Bethel AME Church
  - Lyric Theater
  - St. John's Baptist Church

== Monroe County ==
- Marathon
  - George Adderley House,
- Pigeon Key
  - Pigeon Key Historic District

== Orange County ==
- Eatonville
  - Eatonville Historic District
- Orlando
  - Well'sbuilt Hotel

== Palm Beach County ==
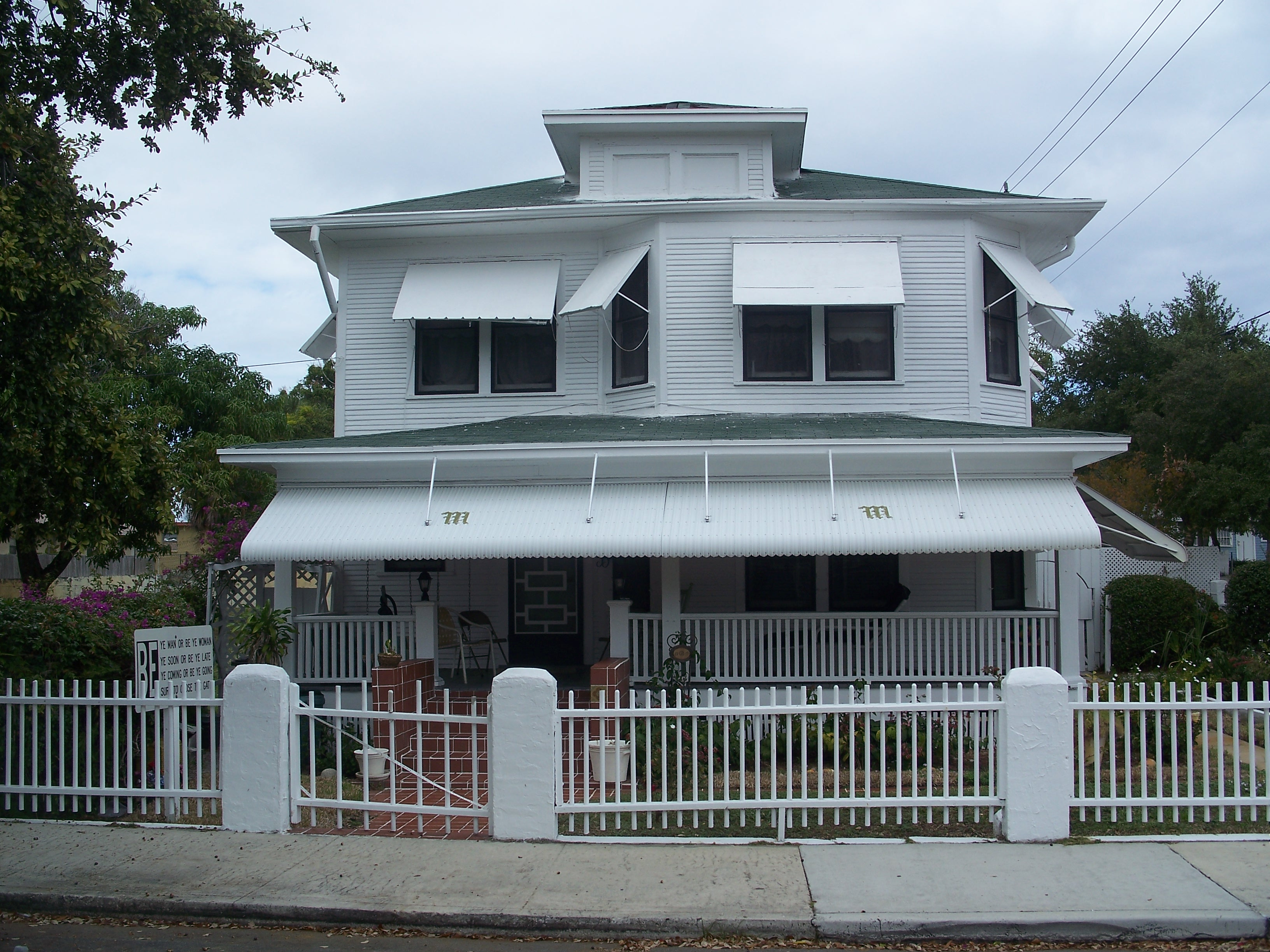
Mickens House

- Lake Worth
  - Osborne School
- West Palm Beach
  - Mickens House

== Pinellas County ==
- African American Heritage Trail of St. Petersburg
- Royal Theater (St. Petersburg, Florida)

== Putnam County ==
- Palatka
  - Newtown
  - Central Academy

== St. Johns County ==
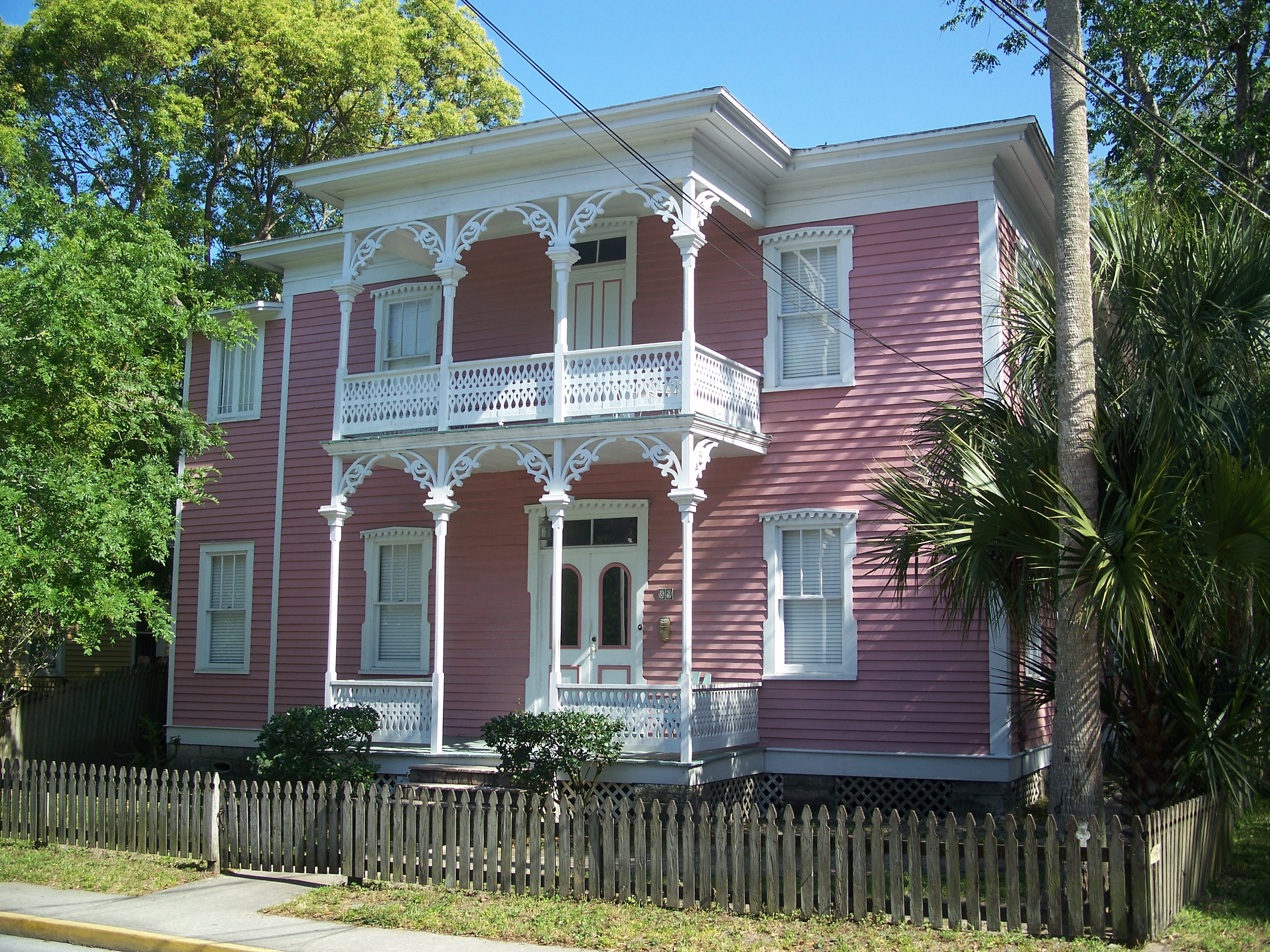
House in the Lincolnville Historic District

- St. Augustine
  - Fort Mose
  - Lincolnville Historic District

== Santa Rosa County ==
- Milton
  - Mt. Pilgrim African Baptist Church
  - Zion AME Church, African Methodist Episcopal Church

== Seminole County ==
- Sanford
  - St. James AME Church

== St. Lucie County ==
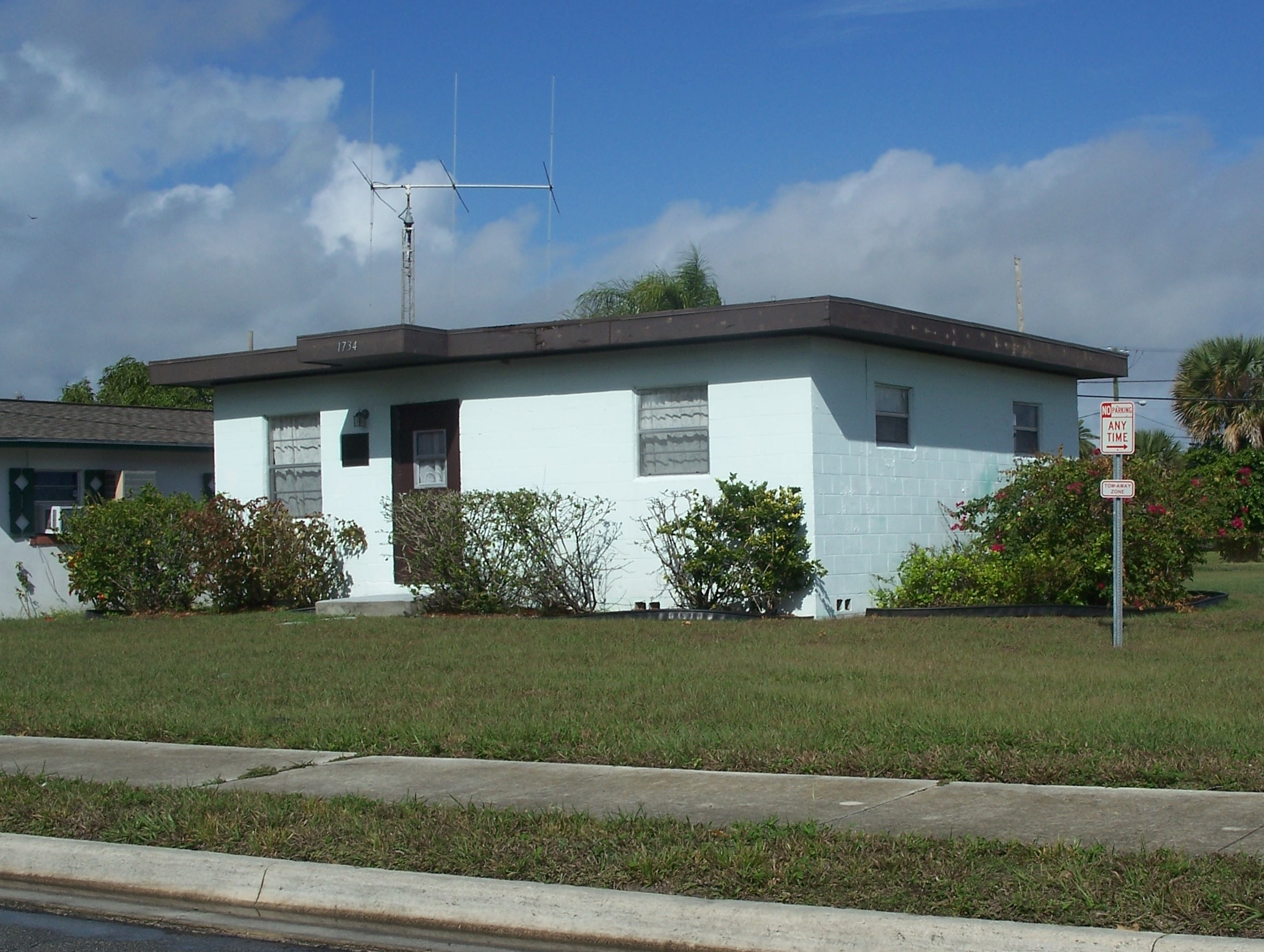
Hurston House

- Fort Pierce
  - Zora Neale Hurston House

== Volusia County ==
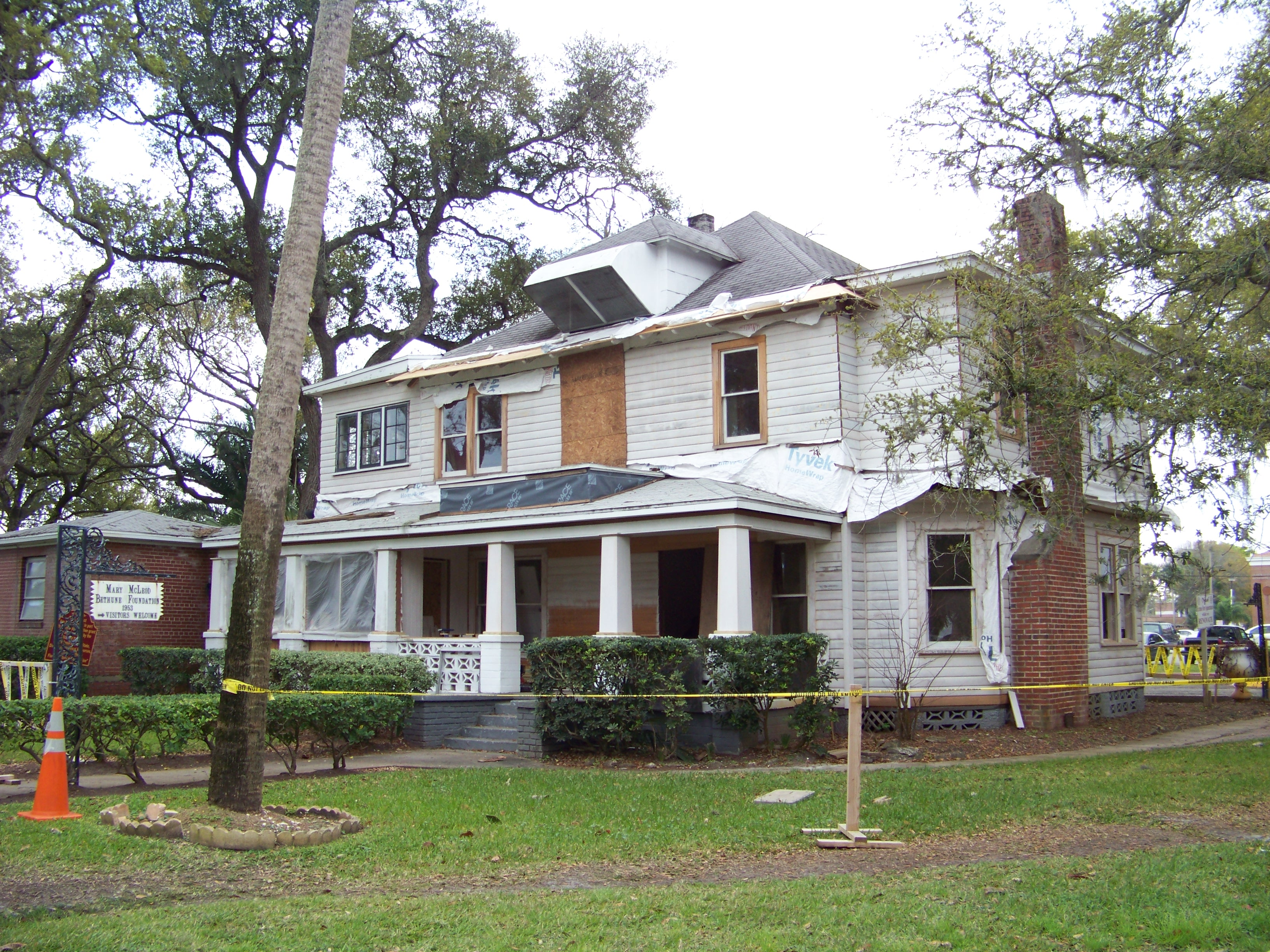
Mary McLeod Bethune Home, NHL, Daytona Beach, Florida

- DeLeon Springs
  - DeLeon Springs Colored School
- Daytona Beach
  - Howard Thurman House
  - Mary McLeod Bethune Home
  - Old DeLand Memorial Hospital
  - White Hall
- Orange City
  - Orange City Colored School
