= Christina Meacham =

- Born: Christina Johnson; 1865; Bahamas
- Died: November 1927 (aged 61–62)
- Other names: Tina Meacham, Mrs. Tina
- Occupations: Teacher, principal
- Spouse: Robert Meacham Jr.
- Relatives: Robert Meacham (Father in-law)

Christina "Mrs. Tina" Meacham (née Johnson; 1865 – November 1927) was a Bahamian-born American educator, and principal in Tampa, Florida.

== Life and career ==
Christina Meacham was born as Christian Johnson in 1865, in the Bahamas.

She married Robert Meacham Jr., the son of Robert Meacham, who was superintendent of schools and postmaster in Monticello, Florida. They lived at 602 East Scott Street in Tampa. She was a foster parent.

Meacham was principal at Harlem Academy in Tampa. Blanche Armwood was also a teacher and taught alongside her, and she later served as the executor of Meacham's estate. Meacham was a founder of Hillsborough County's branch of the Florida Negro Teachers Association and Bowman Methodist Episcopal Church (now Tyer Temple United Methodist Church) in Tampa.

She was the namesake of Meacham Elementary School (1926–1971) in Tampa, and the Meacham Urban Farm (2016–present) in Tampa.

== See also ==
- Zachariah D. Green
