= African Americans in Florida =

Ethnic group in Florida

Total population
- 3,337,159 (2014)

Regions with significant populations
- North Florida and Miami metropolitan area

Languages
- Southern American English, African-American Vernacular English, Haitian Creole, Jamaican Patois, Cuban Spanish, Gullah, Afro-Seminole Creole, Miami English, Caribbean English, African languages

Religion
- Christianity, Haitian Voodoo, Black Protestant, Evangelical Protestant, Black Catholicism, Jehovah's Witness, Irreligion, Santería, Rastafari

Related ethnic groups
- Afro-Cubans, Afro-Caribbeans, Black Seminoles, Gullah, West Indian Americans, Black Hispanic and Latino Americans, Bahamian Americans, Jamaican Americans, Haitian Americans, Hispanics in Florida, Indigenous peoples of Florida

As of the 2010 U.S. Census, African Americans were 16.6% of the population of Florida. The African-American presence in the peninsula extends as far back as the early 18th century, when African-American slaves escaped from slavery in Georgia into the swamps of the peninsula. Black slaves were brought to Florida by Spanish conquistadors.

== History ==
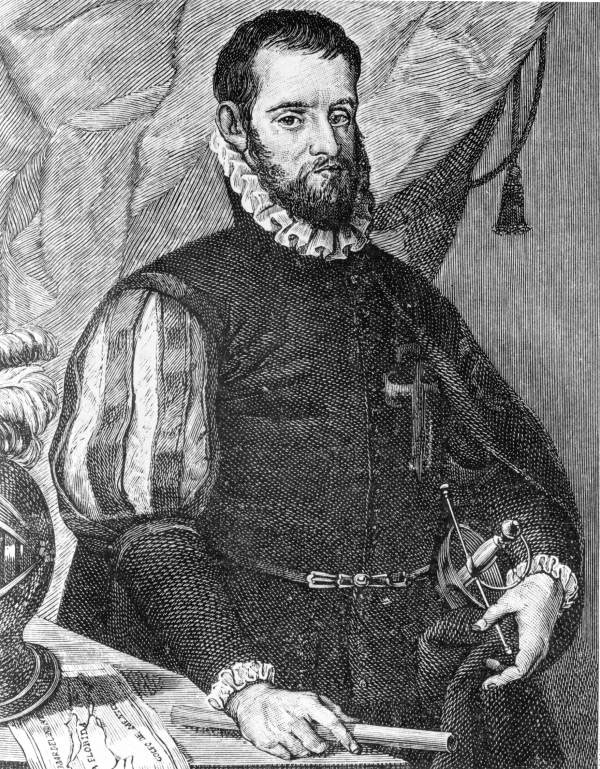
Spanish admiral, explorer and conquistador Pedro Menéndez de Avilés brought African slaves to St. Augustine, Florida.

Juan Garrido, a Spanish explorer of Kongo descent, was the first Black individual to visit Florida and served under Juan Ponce de León on behalf of the Spanish Crown.

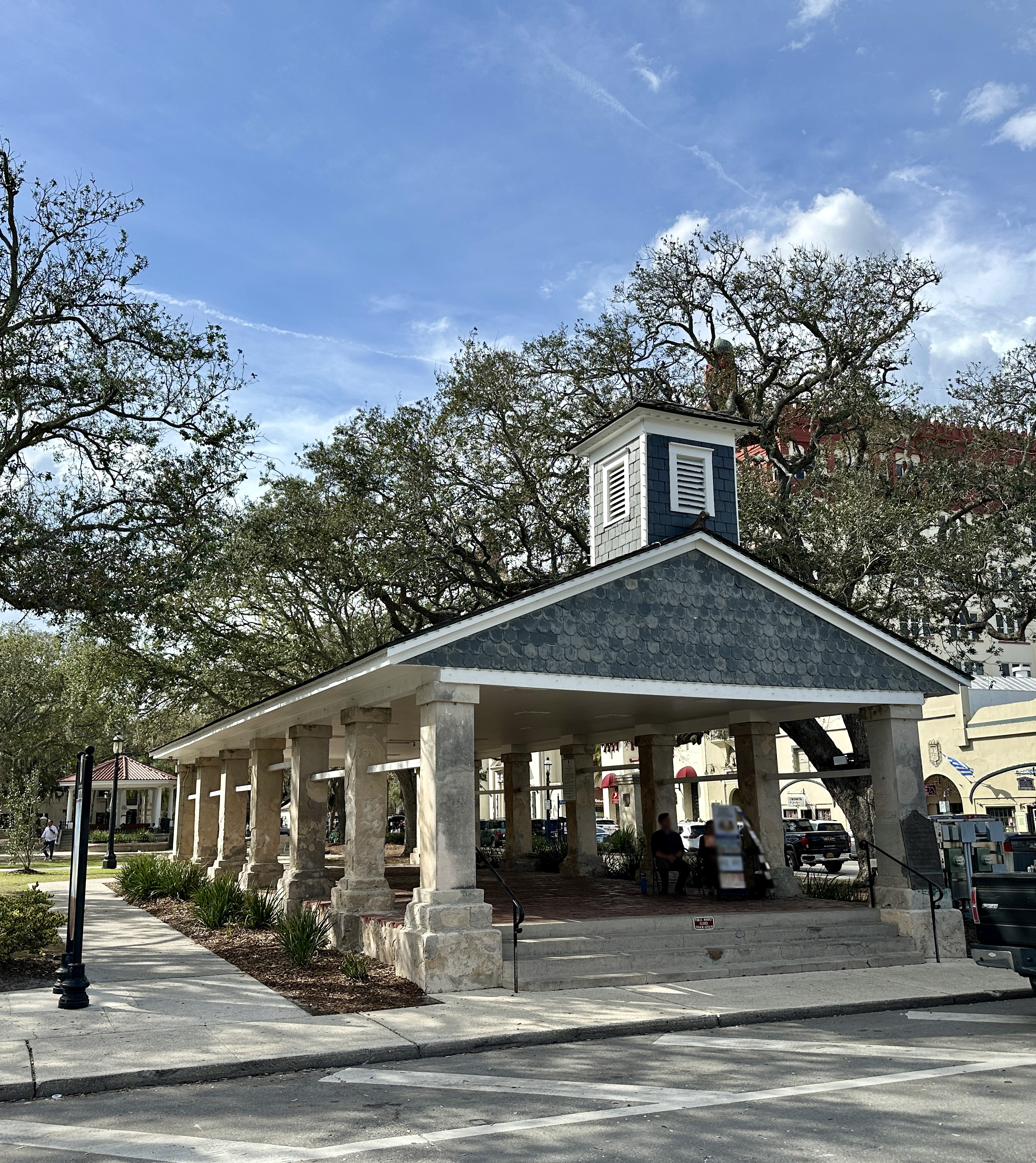
Old Slave Market, St. Augustine, a slave market where African slaves were sold.

The history of African Americans in Florida can be divided into several eras, the dates varying by location: 1) Slavery until 1865. A few slaves had been freed, but were never free from the threat of being again enslaved. 2) The Seminole Wars. From the years of 1816 through 1858, Black Seminoles along with their Native Seminole allies fought a series of three wars, known as the Seminole Wars with the United States. Black Seminoles are the descendants of mostly Gullah-Geechee and Native Seminole ancestry, though general Black American ancestry is also present. 3) Reconstruction after the American Civil War. 3) Remainder of 19th century. 4) Terrorist activity against African Americans. 5) Civil Rights Era. 5) Late 20th-21st century.

The history of Black people in Florida dates back to the pre-American period, beginning with the arrival of Congolese-Spanish conquistador Juan Garrido in 1513, the enslaved Afro-Spanish explorer Estevanico in 1528, and the landing of free and African enslaved persons at Mission Nombre de Dios in the future St. Augustine, Florida in 1565.

The first Black city in the state came in the latter region when a military outpost of free Black settlers was established at Fort Mose when the Black population became numerous in St Augustine. The uptick was largely due to fugitive slaves from British colonies in North America to Spanish Florida where they were promised freedom in exchange for military service and conversion to Catholicism.

Florida was later acquired by the British, bringing the First Spanish Period to an end and the departure of the Spanish population (including blacks) to Cuba. African-American slaves soon became the main Black population in the state. The Spanish regained Florida briefly in 1784 before departing in 1821.

After the Civil War, there was a brief Reconstruction era from 1867 to 1877. This included enforcement of rights for African Americans. This era vanished suddenly, the result of the Compromise of 1877.

Post-reconstruction policies allowed civil rights for blacks to lapse. Black voters and black politicians vanished under threats from reactionary whites.

Per capita lynching was highest in Florida than any other state from 1900 to 1930. Offenders were often known but no legal proceedings ensued. A tipping point was reached in 1951, with the Murder of Harry and Harriette Moore. FBI help was sought. The KKK was suspected, but there was insufficient evidence for trial. A violent era was followed by continued segregation.

Governor LeRoy Collins took the position that segregation was morally unfair and wrong. This was succeeded by Federal Civil Rights Act in 1964. Schools were integrated, but not without difficulty.

There was an Afro-Cuban community in Tampa and Ybor City in the 1880s. Afro-Cubans were segregated from white Cubans and separated from African Americans by language, culture, and religion. Afro-Cubans were discriminated in Florida due to their skin color.

African slaves who escaped from English plantations were given sanctuary by the Spanish in Florida.

Racial segregation forced black people and white people to attend different schools in Florida. The quality of education was poor for African American children. In the year 1956, two African American black women were arrested in the city Tallahassee for sitting in the front seats of a bus when they were told to sit in the back of the bus.

== Population ==
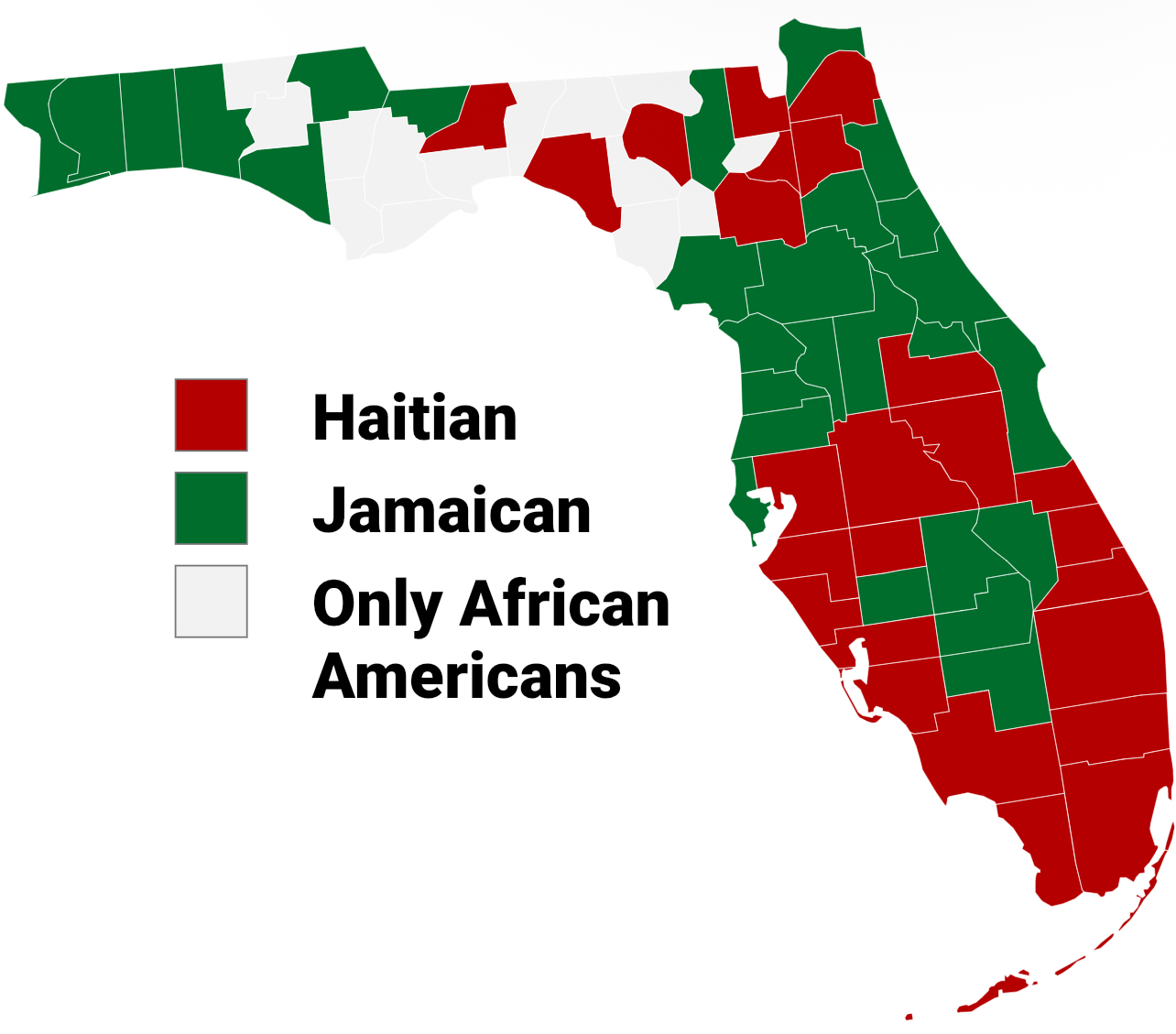
Largest Black alone or in any combination ethnic origin besides African American by county, per the 2020 census

In the 2020 Census, 3,246,381 Florida residents were identified as African American (15.1% of the total 21,538,187). In 11 of the state's 67 counties, African Americans make up more than 20% of the population: Gadsden (53.5%), Madison (35.1%), Hamilton (32.0%), Jefferson (31.8%), Leon (30.4%), Duval (29.4%), Broward (27.4%), Jackson (25.7%), Escambia (21.4%), St. Lucie (20.2%), and Union (20.0%). African Americans in the seven counties of Broward (531,910), Miami-Dade (400,002), Duval (292,337), Orange (277,027), Palm Beach (262,422), Hillsborough (237,434), and Polk (105,533) make up more than 64% of all African Americans in the state.

As of 2010, those of African ancestry accounted for 16.0% of Florida's population, which includes African Americans. Out of the 16.0%, 4.0% (741,879) were Afro-Caribbean American.

During the early 1900s, Black people made up nearly half of the state's population. In response to segregation, disfranchisement and agricultural depression, many African Americans migrated from Florida to northern cities in the Great Migration, in waves from 1910 to 1940, and again starting in the later 1940s. They moved for jobs, better education for their children and the chance to vote and participate in society. By 1960, the proportion of African Americans in the state had declined to 18%. Conversely, large numbers of northern whites moved to the state. Today, large concentrations of black residents can be found in northern and central Florida. Aside from blacks descended from African slaves brought to the southern U.S., there are also large numbers of Black people of Caribbean, recent African, and Afro-Latino immigrant origins, especially in the Miami/South Florida area.

== Notable people ==
- James Weldon Johnson (1871–1938)
- Mary McLeod Bethune (1875–1955)
- Frank B. Butler (1885–1973)
- Blanche Armwood (1890–1939)
- Zora Neale Hurston (1891–1960)
- Augusta Savage (1892–1962)
- Thelma "Butterfly" McQueen (1911–1995)
- Sidney Poitier (1927–2022)
- George "Buster" Cooper (1929–2016)
- Peggy Quince (born in 1941)
- Angela Bassett (born in 1958)
- Emmitt Smith (born in 1969)
- Maya Rudolph (born in 1972)
- Andrew Gillum (born in 1979)
- Barry Jenkins (born in 1979)
- Eric Darius (born in 1982)
- Antonio Brown (born in 1988)
- Rachel Jeantel (born in 1994)
- Denzel Curry (born in 1995)
- Trayvon Martin (1995–2012)
- Trick Daddy (born 1974)
- Flo Rida (born 1979)
- T-Pain (born 1984)
- Rick Ross (born 1976)
- Rod Wave (born 1998)
- Nardo Wick (born 2001)
- Captain Francisco Menéndez
- Jonathan Clarkson Gibbs (1828–1874)

== See also ==
- Demographics of Florida
- Black Seminoles
- African American officeholders from the end of the Civil War until before 1900
- Negro Fort
- Gullah
- History of slavery in Florida
- African Americans in Georgia (U.S. state)
- History of African Americans in Jacksonville, Florida
- Afro-Cubans
- Hispanics and Latinos in Florida
- Indigenous peoples of Florida
- Black Southerners
- History of Florida
- List of African-American newspapers in Florida
- List of African-American historic places in Florida
