= Florida's Historic Black Public Schools Multiple Property Submission =

- U.S. National Register of Historic Places
- Location: Florida
- MPS
- NRHP reference No.: 64500852

The following buildings were added to the National Register of Historic Places as part of the Florida's Historic Black Public Schools Multiple Property Submission (or MPS).

== History ==
The public school system of Volusia County, Florida was founded in 1869, and the first public school for the county was built in 1872 in New Smyrna Beach. The public schools had very few resources allocated, until the mid-1880s. In 1887, the system supported 379 African American students in 19 schools, most of which were one-room buildings. By 1915, the number of African American students had increased to 2900, supported by 38 school buildings. Around one decade later, they consolidated small rural schools into larger, centrally located facilities resulted in 24 buildings for 4300 African American students. Despite the consolidation and construction of larger schools, several relatively small public schools were built for African American students in Volusia County's during the 1920s, including DeLeon Springs Colored School, and Orange City Colored School.

== List of resources ==
Resource Name	Image	Also known as	Address	City/County	Added
DeLeon Springs Colored School		Malloy Elementary School, or Malloy Head Start	330 East Retta Street	DeLeon Springs, Volusia County	August 1, 2003
Orange City Colored School		Marian Coleman Elementary	200 East Blue Springs Avenue	Orange City, Volusia County	August 1, 2003
Osborne School		Osborne Elementary School	1718 South Douglas Street	Lake Worth, Palm Beach County	August 1, 2003
Liberty Hill Schoolhouse			7600 Northwest 23rd Avenue	Gainesville, Alachua County	August 28, 2003
Meacham Elementary School		India Street School, Christina Meacham Elementary School, or Meacham Alternative School	1225 India Street	Tampa, Hillsborough County	September 15, 2005
Old Howard Academy			835 Mamie Scott Drive	Monticello, Jefferson County	September 15, 2021 ^{2}

== Notes ==
2. In 2007, the school building was demolished as part of a redevelopment project of the area. Morelli, Keith (November 30, 2007). "Meacham School Razed". The Tampa Tribune. Archived from the original on July 14, 2014.
