= Rutledge, Florida =

Unincorporated community in Alachua County, Florida

Coordinates: 29.6819112°N 82.4098296°W

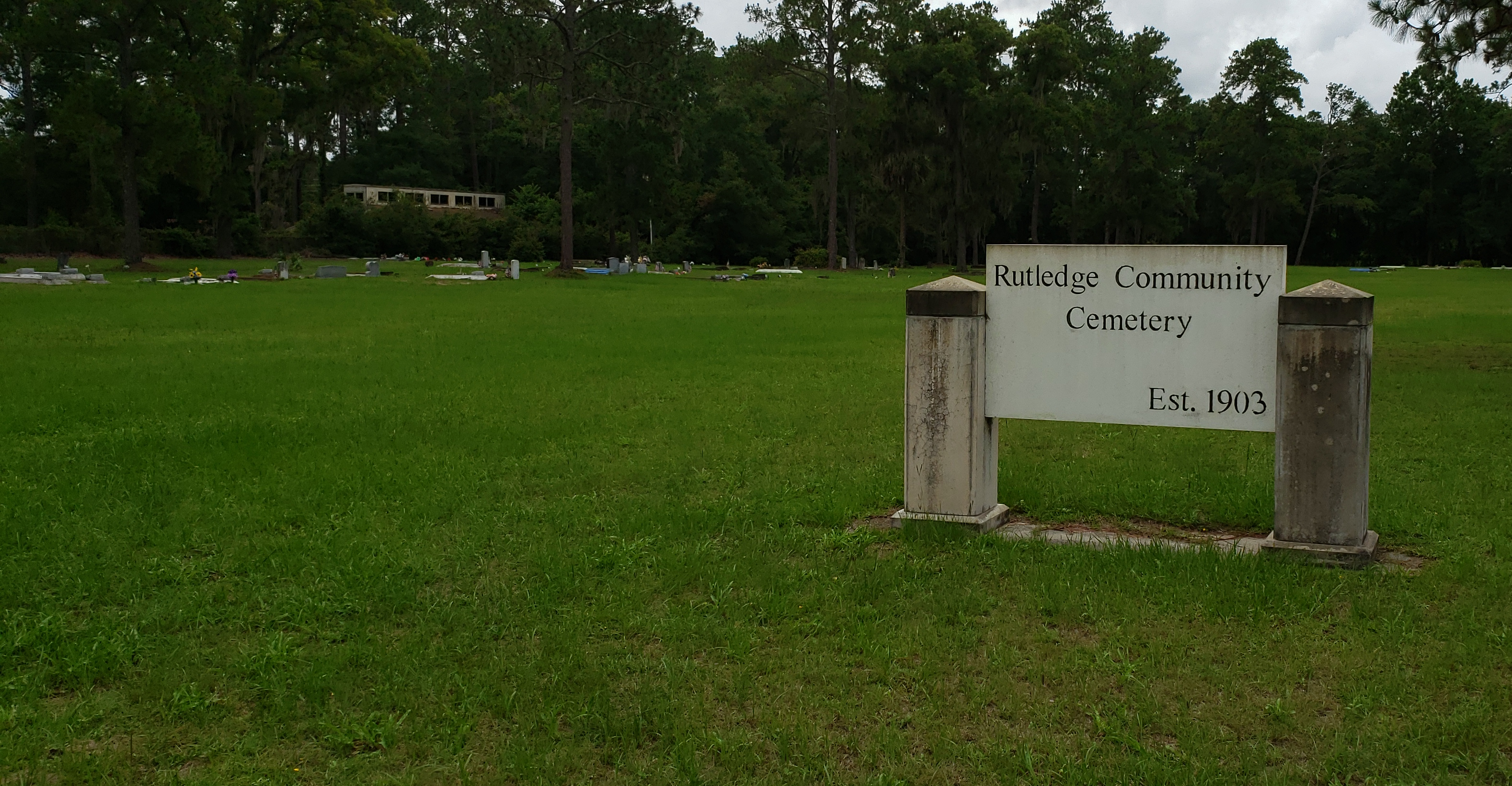
Rutledge Community Cemetery

Rutledge, Florida is an unincorporated community in central Alachua County, Florida. The community was established for formerly enslaved persons during Reconstruction by the Freedmen's Bureau. The First Morning Star Missionary Baptist Church and the Greater Liberty Hill United Methodist Church, both founded in the 19th century, continue to serve the community. The Greater Liberty Hill church is the site of the Liberty Hill Schoolhouse, which is on the National Register of Historic Places. The Rutledge Community Cemetery, formerly called Union Cemetery of Rutledge, is under the stewardship of the Second Morning Star Missionary Baptist Church. The center of the community was located about five miles west of Gainesville, Florida in the 19th century. As of 2021 it extends from just west of the Gainesville city limits to I-75. A post office was established in 1886, and closed in 1905. In 1888 the community had three stores and a boarding house. It was on the planned route of the Gainesville, Tallahassee and Western Railroad, which was never built.
