= Strawn Historic Citrus Packing House District =

Historic district in Florida, United States

- U.S. National Register of Historic Places
- U.S. Historic district
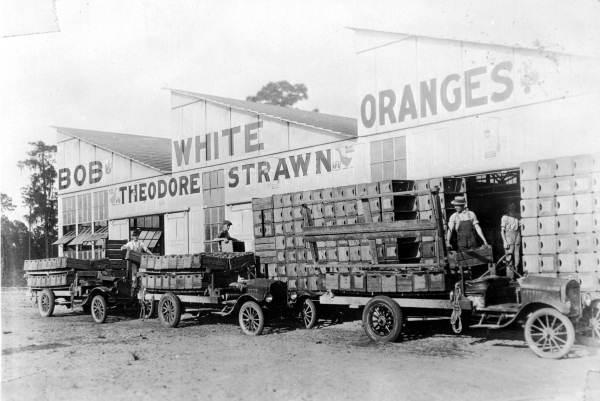
- Early 20th century photo of the plant in operation

- Location within Volusia County
- Location: DeLeon Springs, Florida, USA
- Coordinates: 29°8′18″N 81°21′35″W
- Area: 20 acres (0.081 km^{2})
- MPS: Citrus Industry Resources of Theodore Strawn, Inc., MPS
- NRHP reference No.: 93000931
- Added to NRHP: September 13, 1993

The Strawn Historic Citrus Packing House District (also known as the Bob White Historic Citrus Packing House District) is a U.S. historic district (designated as such on September 13, 1993) located at 5707 Lake Winona Road in DeLeon Springs, Florida in Volusia County. It contains 12 historic buildings and 3 structures. The packing house is in a state of abandoned decay and has not been in operation since 1983.

== Description ==
The 20-acre site is situated off of U.S. Route 17 between Lake Winona Road and Ridgewood Avenue. It is bordered by the CSX railroad line on the southwest. It consists of a packing house with a distinctive saw tooth roof. Behind this building stands a barn, blacksmith shop, machinery house, a steam and dynamo building and 10 other structures.

== History ==
Theodore Strawn, a native of Illinois, settled in West Volusia County and started an orange packing operation in 1882. In 1921, the original packing house burned and a metal structure with an iconic sawtooth roof was constructed to replace it. The walls were built from stamped copper alloy steel panels, and designed to be fireproof.

The packing house was closed down after a destructive freeze on Christmas 1983. That year, the orange trees were killed down to the stump, according to John Strawn, the grandson of Theodore Strawn, the site's founder.

The site was placed on the National Register of Historic Places in 1993, along with a sawmill and some additional Strawn agricultural buildings about a mile away.

The site has been heavily vandalized and looted over the years since it closed, in spite of no trespassing signs and a fence around the facility. In 2008 a fire destroyed the machine shop. In 2010, a fire destroyed a 40-foot by 50-foot outbuilding and damaged two others.

The site, even in its dilapidated condition, is of significant historical importance, as it depicts the early development of the citrus industry in Florida. It has been on The Florida Trust for Historic Preservation's list of Florida's Eleven Most Endangered Historic Sites since 2007. It is listed as endangered by the Volusia County Historic Preservation Board.

== Gallery ==
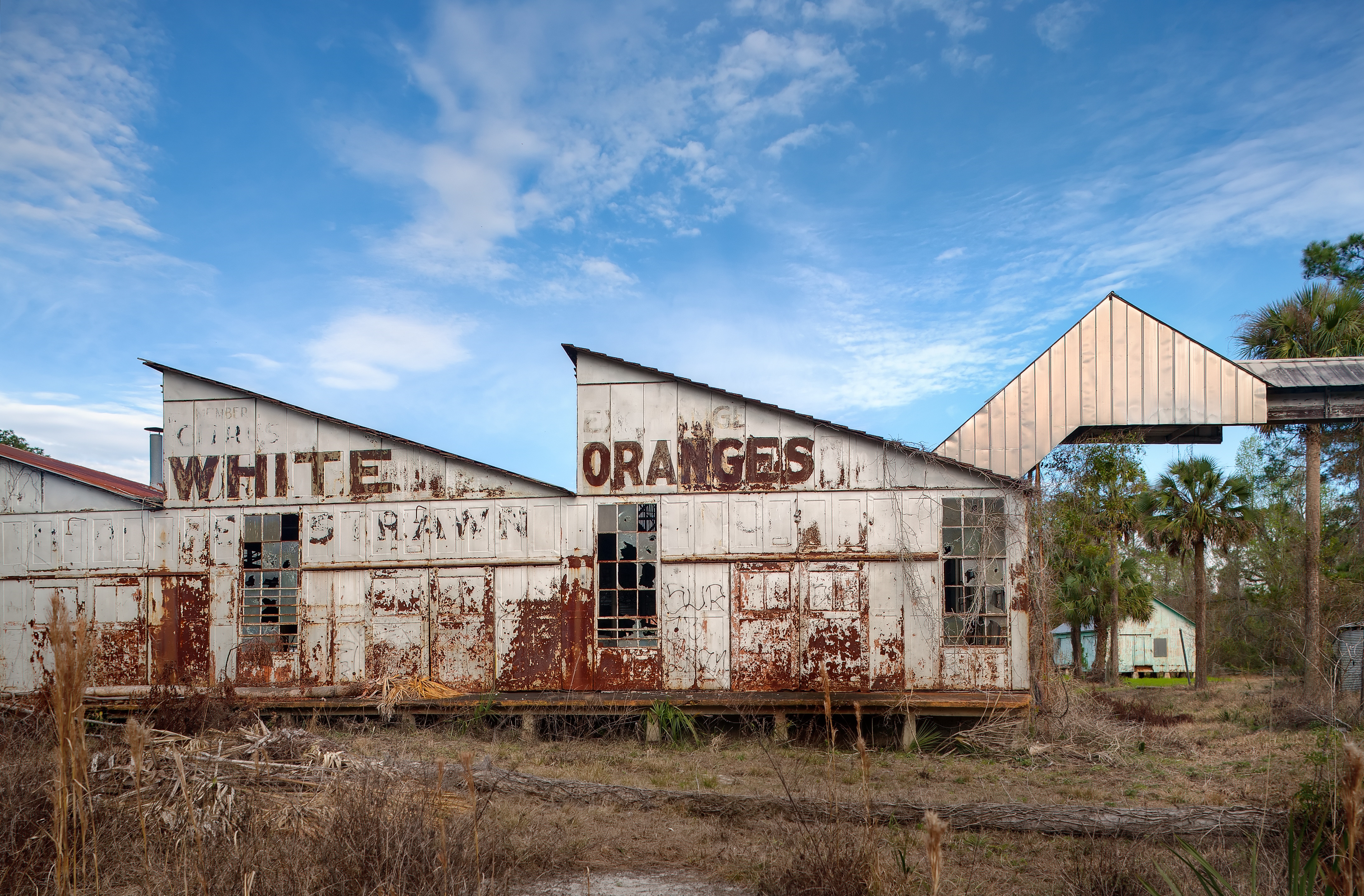
Theodore Strawn Packing House in 2009

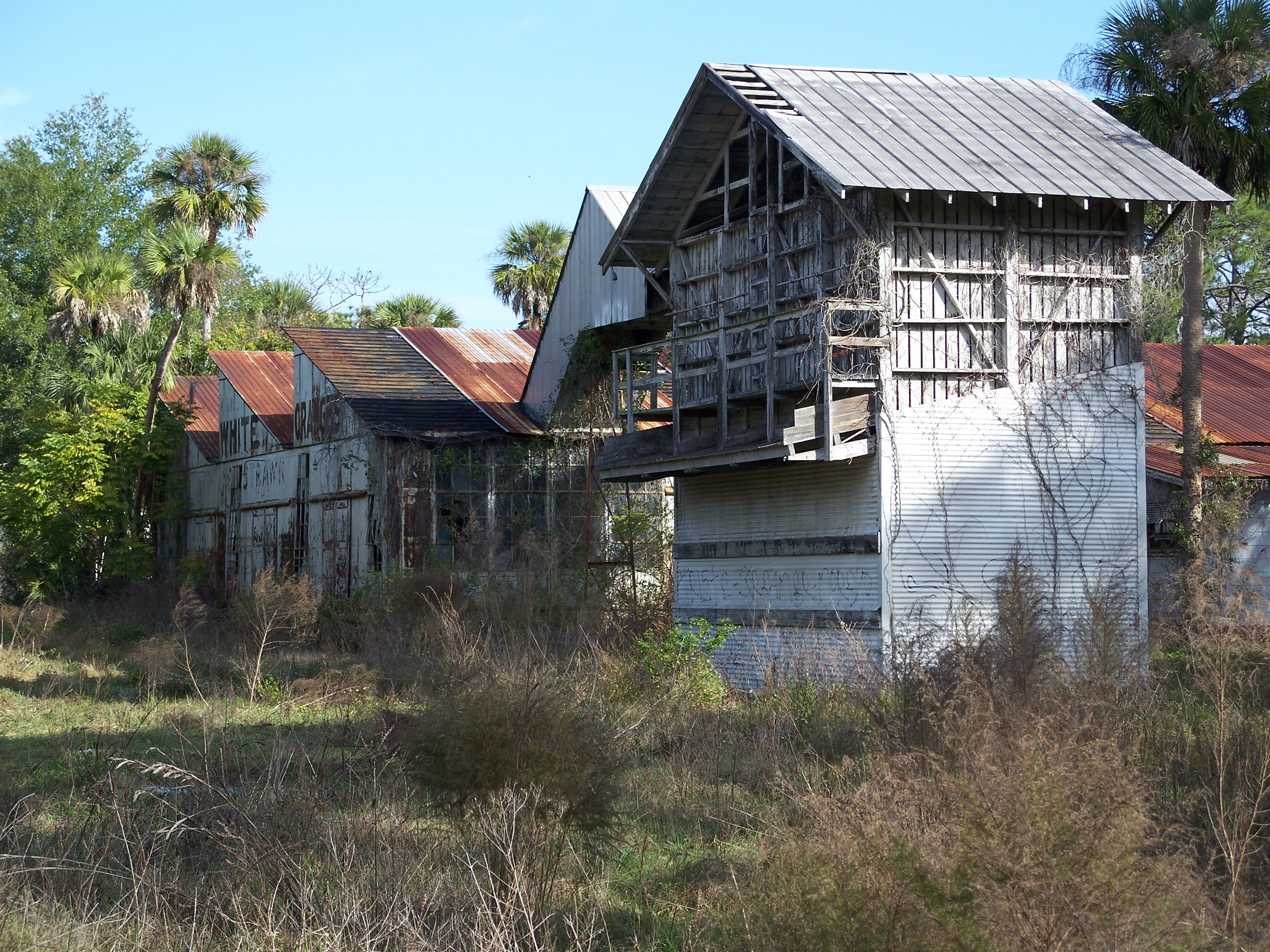
Weeds and vines around the abandoned buildings

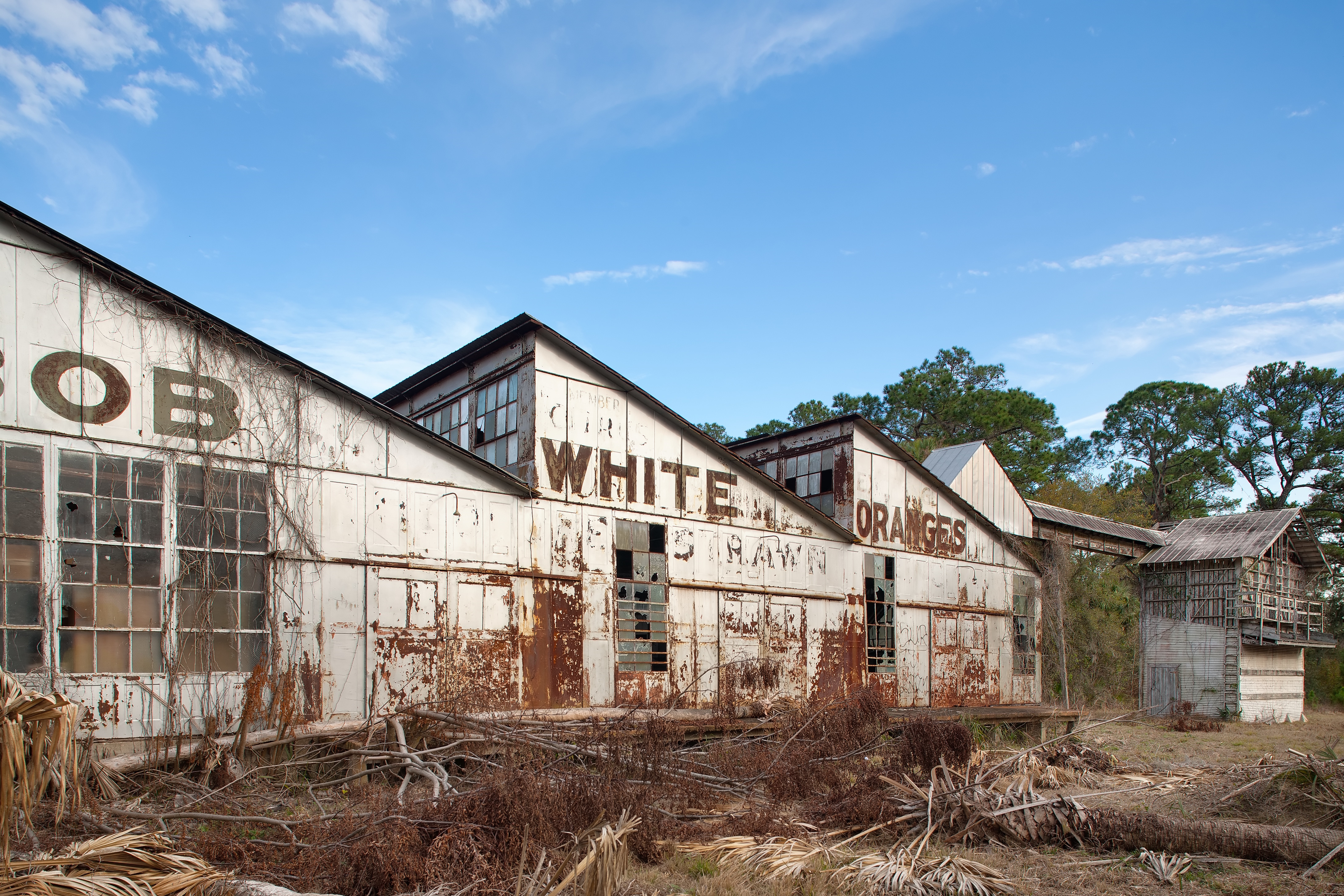
Rusted facade

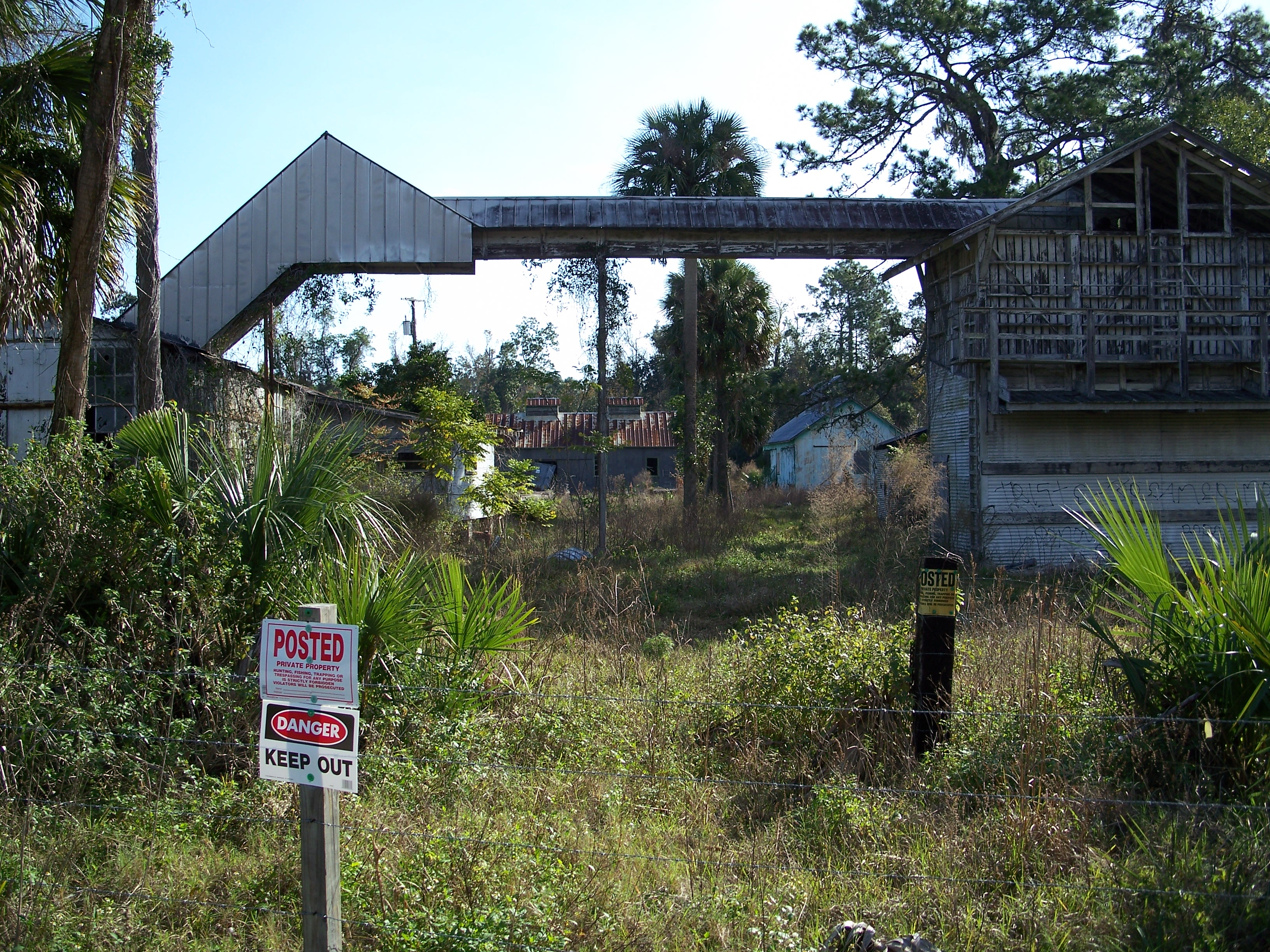
Buildings in the District
