= Liberty Hill Schoolhouse (Gainesville, Florida) =

- U.S. National Register of Historic Places
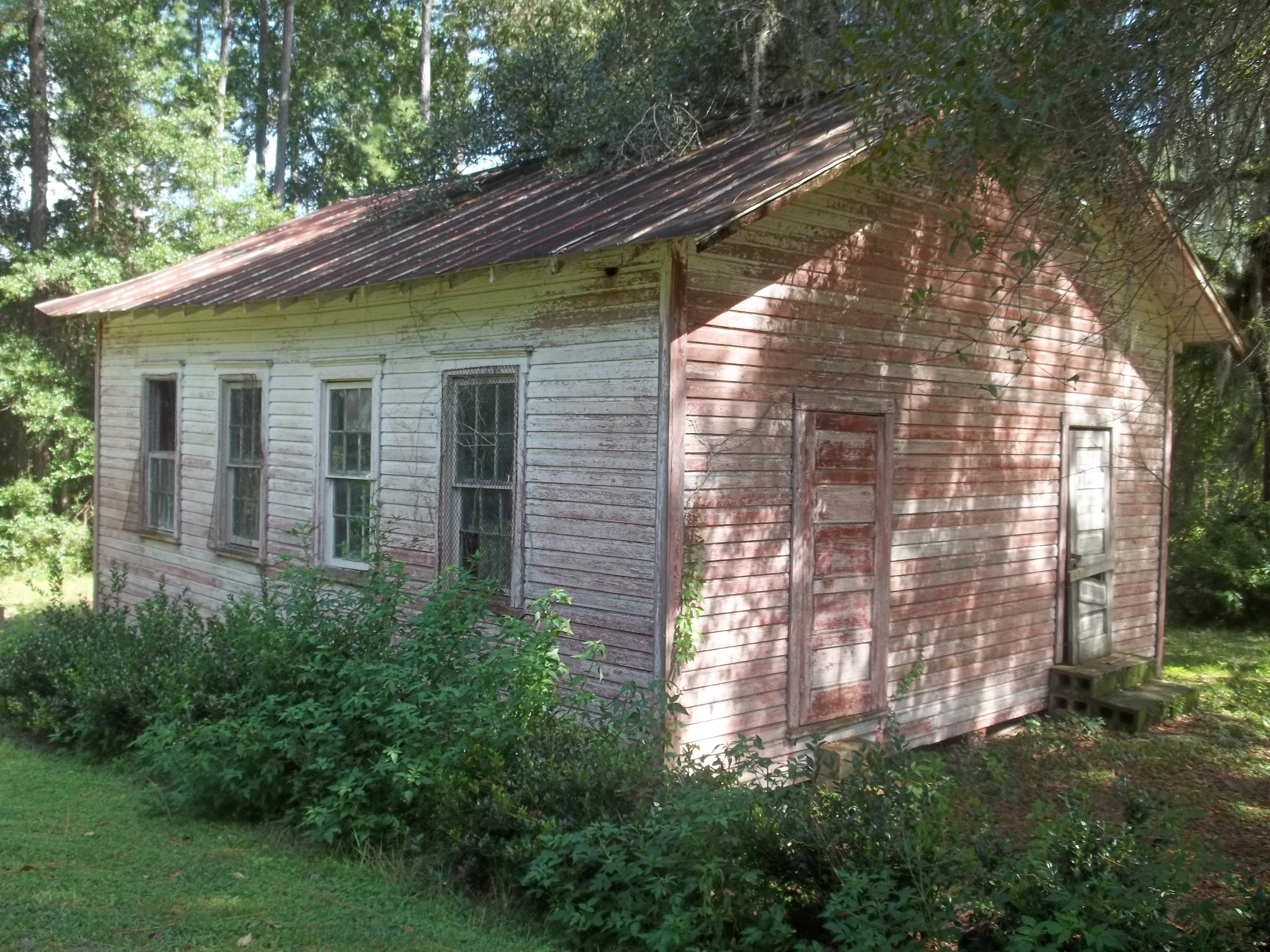

- Location within Florida Location within the United States
- Location: 7600 NW 23rd Ave., Gainesville, Florida
- Coordinates: 29°40′27.9″N 82°25′24.1″W
- Built: 1892
- Built by: J. T. Eddins
- Architectural style: Frame Vernacular
- MPS: Florida's Historic Black Public Schools MPS
- NRHP reference No.: 03000825
- Added to NRHP: August 28, 2003

Liberty Hill Schoolhouse in Gainesville, Florida is a one-room schoolhouse built in 1892 to serve African-American children. It replaced a previous Liberty Hill School that was in operation by about 1869, and it operated until 1952. The school served students from the community of Rutledge.

It is 24.5 feet (7.5 m) by 30.5 feet (9.3 m). There were no lights in the building and drinking water was brought in.

It was listed on the National Register of Historic Places on August 28, 2003.

== See also ==
- Florida's Historic Black Public Schools Multiple Property Submission
