= Mt. Pilgrim African Baptist Church =

Historic church in Florida, United States

- U.S. National Register of Historic Places
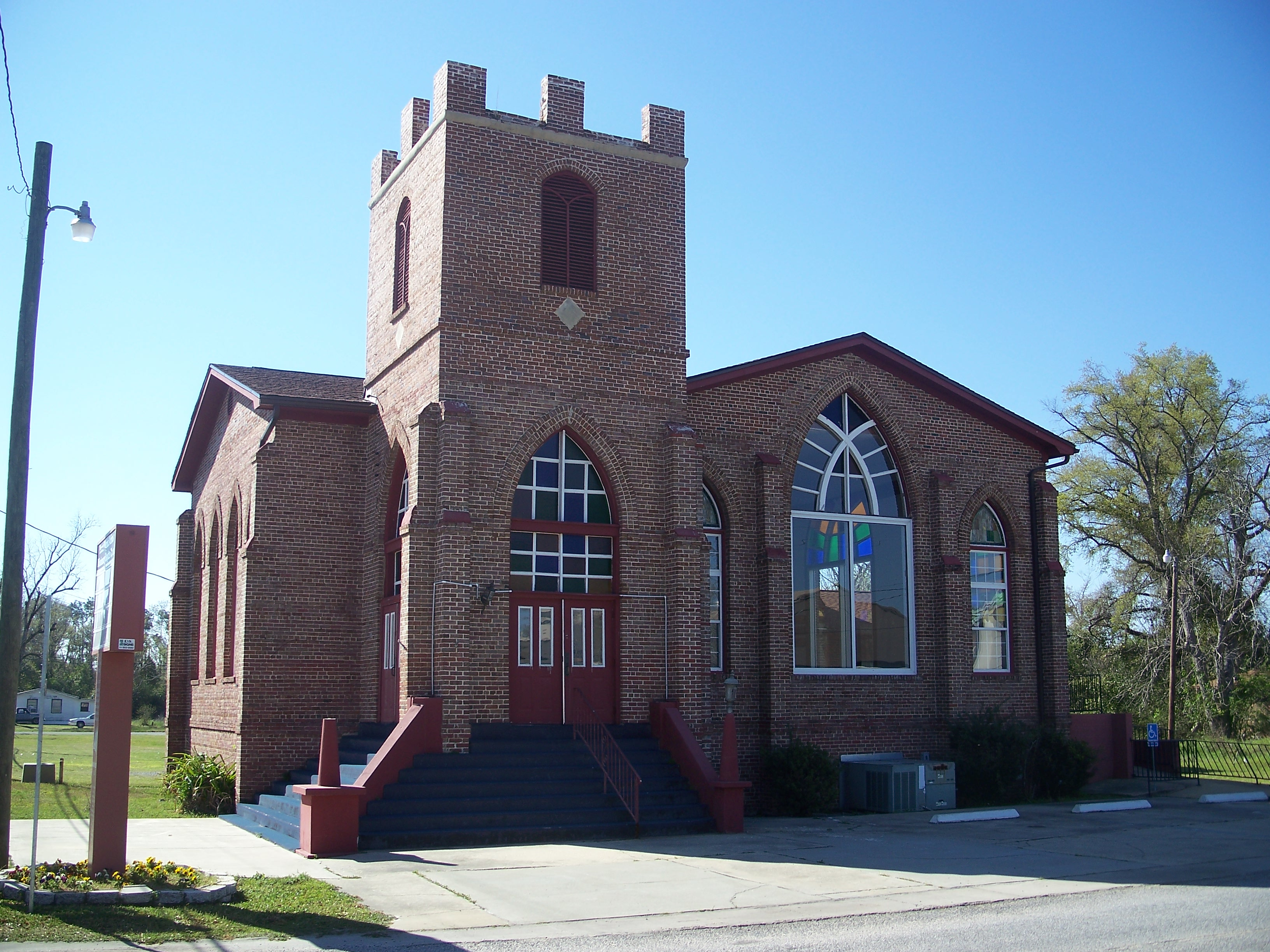

- Location within Florida Location within the United States
- Location: Milton, Florida
- Coordinates: 30°37′11″N 87°2′26″W
- Architectural style: Late Gothic Revival
- NRHP reference No.: 92000634
- Added to NRHP: May 29, 1992

The Mt. Pilgrim African Baptist Church (also known as the Mt. Pilgrim Baptist Church) is a historic church in Milton, Florida. It is located at the junction of Alice and Clara Streets.

On May 29, 1992, it was added to the U.S. National Register of Historic Places. In 1989, the church was listed in A Guide to Florida's Historic Architecture, published by the University of Florida Press.
