= Osborne School (Lake Worth, Florida) =

- U.S. National Register of Historic Places
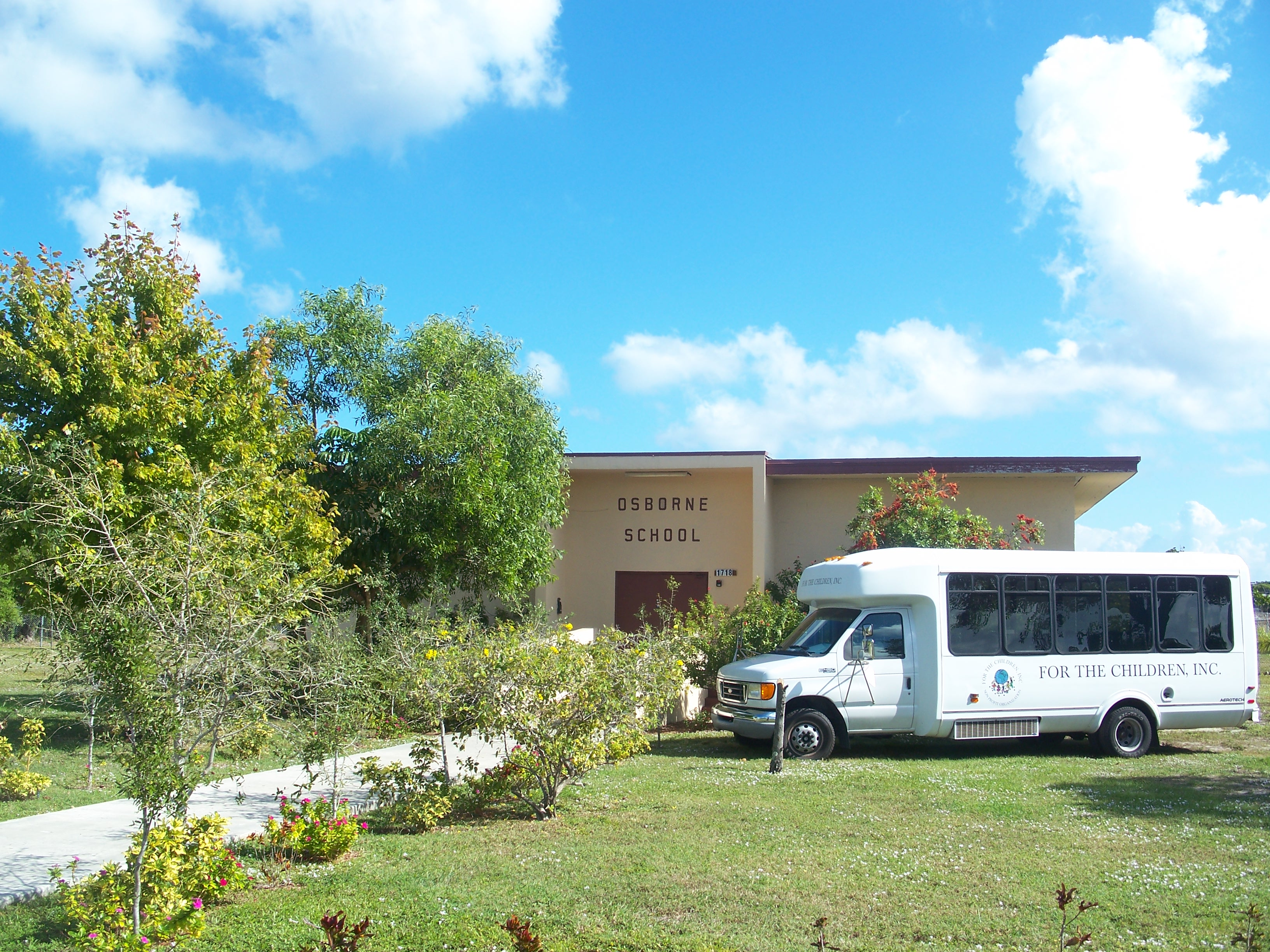

- Location within Florida
- Location: 1718 S. Douglas St., Lake Worth, Florida, U.S.
- Coordinates: 26°35′39″N 80°03′22″W
- Area: 0.82 acres (0.33 ha)
- Built: 1948
- Architect: Wortman, Edgar S.; Odums, P.W. and Able, Wilson
- MPS: Florida's Historic Black Public Schools MPS
- NRHP reference No.: 03000701
- Added to NRHP: August 1, 2003

The Osborne School was a segregated public school for African-American students located at 1726 Douglas Street S. in Lake Worth Beach, Florida, United States. Opened in 1948, the school continued to operate on a racially segregated basis despite the Brown v. Board of Education ruling by the Supreme Court of the United States in 1954, until closing in 1971. By that time, the Osborne School was the last in Florida to be integrated. It has been listed on the National Register of Historic Places since August 1, 2003, and Florida's Historic Black Public Schools Multiple Property Submission.

== History and description ==
Upon Lake Worth's (now known as Lake Worth Beach) incorporation in 1913, the charter banned African-Americans from living within its boundaries. However, a segregated neighborhood known as the Osborne Colored Addition was established in 1917, likely named after Lake Osborne. This five-block, 10 acres (4.0 ha) section existed just west of Dixie Highway and the Florida East Coast Railway. Like most of Palm Beach County during the Jim Crow era, especially before the 1940s, the Osborne Colored Addition lacked educational facilities for African-Americans. Students in this area were instead transported about 15 miles (24 km) south of Delray Beach.

In 1945, the School District of Palm Beach County announced its intentions to build an elementary school in the Osborne Colored Addition. They selected Edgar S. Wortman as the architect in February 1947 and instructed him to acquire excess lumber from the then-recently decommissioned Camp Murphy. Wortman had previously designed schools within Palm Beach County. Local residents constructed the structure, including Frank Jones, P. W. Odum, and Able Wilson, who by June finished with the building, a frame schoolhouse with three rooms. However, a hurricane on September 16 damaged the schoolhouse enough to require new designs to be created.

Wortman's new plan, submitted in October 1947, called for concrete block construction to be utilized rather than constructing another frame structure. According to the school board meeting minutes for December, "Mr. Wortman reported the blackboards for Lake Osborne School will be delivered by Mr. George Hopkins and the school should be ready for occupancy by the time the Christmas vacation is over." On February 17, 1948, the Osborne School opened with a gala attended by several local officials and civic organizations. Geoffrey B. Henry, Jared N. Tuk, and Barbara E. Mattick described the school as "a source of community pride. Many of its teachers were locally trained and educated." Despite the Brown v. Board of Education ruling by the United States Supreme Court (SCOTUS) in 1954, the school continued to operate as a racially segregated educational facility. A follow-up ruling by SCOTUS in 1969 again ordered the end of segregation. Upon its closure in 1971, Osborne was the last school in Florida to be integrated. Students who formerly attended the school were then transported by bus to the two other elementary schools in Lake Worth.

The schoolhouse is located at 1726 Douglas Street S. It sits on a 0.82 acres (0.33 ha) property and is a one-story concrete block structure of International Style architecture with vernacular features. Henry, Tuk, and Mattick also describe the building's exterior as "three-bay-wide, six-bay-deep" and the interior as having three classrooms, two restrooms, a dining room, and a kitchen.

=== Repurposed ===
In 1980, the building was repurposed as a community education center. The Osborne School was listed on the National Register of Historic Places on August 1, 2003, and is also part of Florida's Historic Black Public Schools Multiple Property Submission. It was a proposed site for affordable housing in 2005.

== See also ==
- National Register of Historic Places listings in Palm Beach County, Florida
