= Robert Meacham =

American politician (1835–1902)

- Born: 1835; Gadsden County, Florida
- Died: February 27, 1902 (aged 66–67); Tampa, Florida
- Occupations: Minister, Politician
- Political party: Republican
- Spouse: Stella

Robert Meacham (1835–1902) was an educational, religious and political leader in Florida during and after Reconstruction. An African-American, he was a slave in Quincy, Florida; one of the sons of his enslaver, he was educated by him. He purchased his freedom and that of his mother with money he had saved out of gratuities given to him by his father. He helped to establish the African Methodist Episcopal Church in Florida and acted as a minister. He helped write Florida's new Constitution of 1868.

In 1868 he was appointed clerk of the Circuit Court for Jefferson County, Florida. The following year he was named "superintendent of common schools". After a two-year term he became postmaster of Monticello, Florida, county seat of Jefferson County. In 1871 he was reappointed to the school position, renewed again when the two-year term ran out. He went on to win a seat in the Florida state legislature as a state senator serving from 1868 until 1879. In 1880 he was made postmaster of Punta Gorda, Florida. He retired to Tampa in 1896, due to failing health, and died in 1902.

His met his wife Stella, while both worked as servants in Tallahassee. His daughter-in-law Christina Meacham (1865-1927) was a teacher and school principal in Tampa for whom the Meacham Early Childhood Center is named.

== See also ==
- William D. Bloxham
- African American officeholders from the end of the Civil War until before 1900
