= DeLeon Springs, Florida =

- CDP
- Location in Volusia County and the state of Florida
- Coordinates: 29°07′26″N 81°21′18″W
- Country: United States
- State: Florida
- County: Volusia

Area
  - Total: 2.69 sq mi (6.98 km^{2})
  - Land: 2.69 sq mi (6.98 km^{2})
  - Water: 0 sq mi (0.00 km^{2})
- Elevation: 49 ft (15 m)

Population (2020)
  - Total: 2,619
  - Density: 971.6/sq mi (375.13/km^{2})
- Time zone: UTC-5 (Eastern (EST))
  - Summer (DST): UTC-4 (EDT)
- ZIP code: 32130
- Area code: 386
- FIPS code: 12-16975
- GNIS feature ID: 281361

DeLeon Springs (/dəˈliːən/) is a census-designated place (CDP) in Volusia County, Florida, United States. The population was 2,614 at the 2010 census. De Leon Springs State Park is located in DeLeon Springs, as is the Strawn Historic Citrus Packing House District.

== History ==
DeLeon Springs is named for Juan Ponce de León. It was originally called Spring Garden and the name was changed in the late 1800s to attract tourists. The region was developed in 1925 with a hotel/restaurant the DeLeon Spring Inn, later called the Ponce de Leon Springs Hotel, which was expanded into a larger tourist attraction in 1953.

The attraction and surrounding area were purchased by the State of Florida to become a state park in 1982.

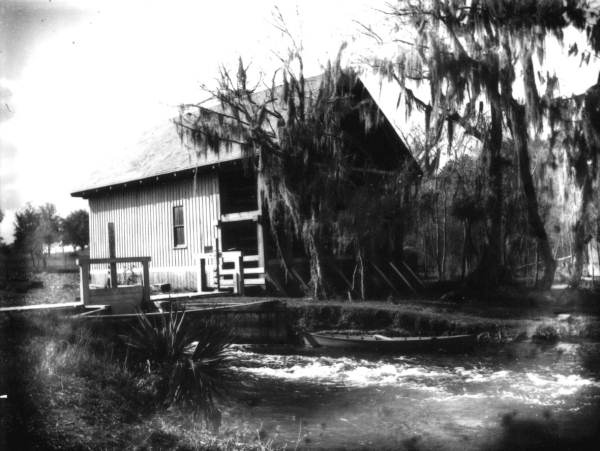
Gristmill house at DeLeon Springs, ca. 1910

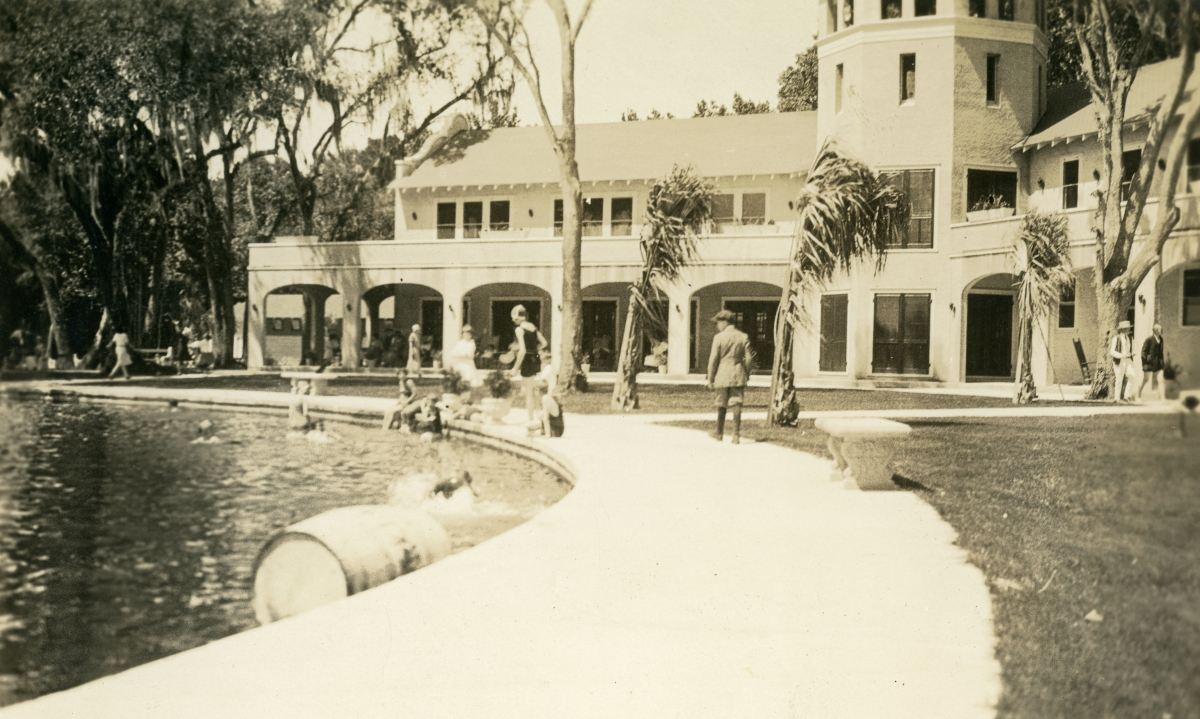
Ponce de Leon Springs Hotel in 1924

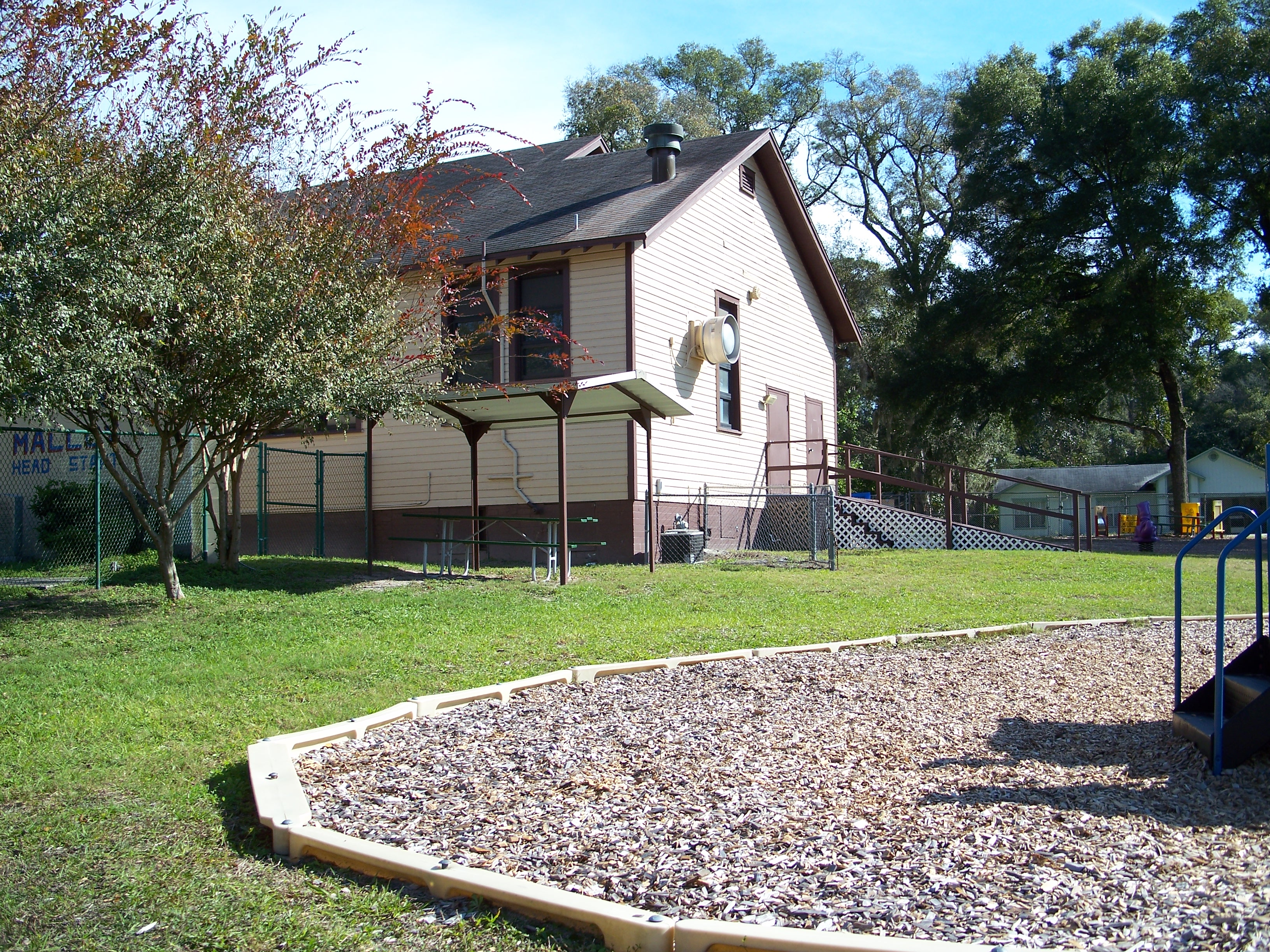
DeLeon Springs Colored School, now Malloy Head Start

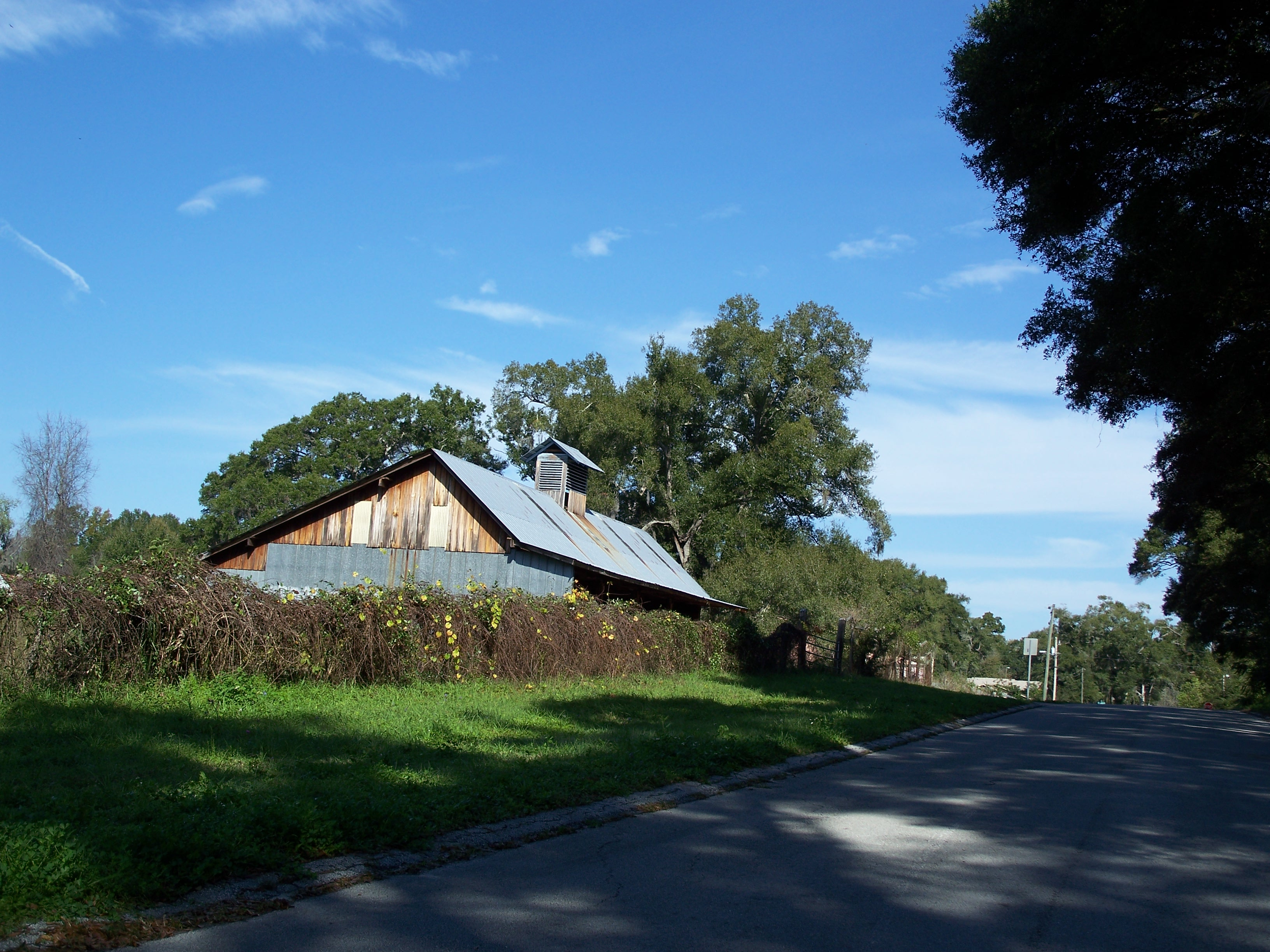
Building in Strawn Historic Agricultural District

== Geography ==
According to the United States Census Bureau, the CDP has a total area of 6.8 km^{2} (2.6 sq mi), all land.

== Demographics ==
Historical population
Census	Pop.	Note	%±
2020	2,619		—
U.S. Decennial Census

As of the census of 2000, there were 2,358 people, 727 households, and 569 families residing in the CDP. The population density was 346.2 people/km^{2} (897 people/mi^{2}). There were 765 housing units at an average density of 112.3 units/km^{2} (291 units/mi^{2}). The racial makeup of the CDP was 66.67% White, 6.87% African American, 0.25% Native American, 0.30% Asian, 23.41% from other races, and 2.50% from two or more races. Hispanic or Latino of any race were 38.08% of the population.

There were 727 households, out of which 39.5% had children under the age of 18 living with them, 57.1% were married couples living together, 15.3% had a female householder with no husband present, and 21.7% were non-families. 16.5% of all households were made up of individuals, and 8.8% had someone living alone who was 65 years of age or older. The average household size was 3.24 and the average family size was 3.59.

In the CDP, the population was spread out, with 31.5% under the age of 18, 10.4% from 18 to 24, 27.6% from 25 to 44, 18.2% from 45 to 64, and 12.4% who were 65 years of age or older. The median age was 31 years. For every 100 females, there were 101.0 males. For every 100 females age 18 and over, there were 97.8 males.

The median income for a household in the CDP was $27,422, and the median income for a family was $34,643. Males had a median income of $25,424 versus $15,547 for females. The per capita income for the CDP was $12,280. About 14.5% of families and 17.2% of the population were below the poverty line, including 26.1% of those under age 18 and 5.9% of those age 65 or over.

== Transportation ==
US 17 passes through the area and County Road 3 (former US 17) begins in the community. In addition, it is served by VOTRAN's #24 route. The CSX Sanford Subdivision also passes through the community, but does not have a station here.

== Notable people ==
- Jacob deGrom, Baseball player for the Texas Rangers.
- Wharlest Jackson (1930–1967) – treasurer of the Natchez, Mississippi branch of the NAACP, born in DeLeon Springs
- Luke Scott – (born 1978) professional baseball player
