= Meacham Elementary School =

School in Tampa, Florida, US (1926–1971)

- U.S. National Register of Historic Places
- Location within Florida
- Location: 1225 India Street, Tampa, Florida, U.S.
- Coordinates: 27°57′19″N 82°27′11″W
- Area: 2.7 acres (1.1 ha)
- Built: 1926
- Architect: I. A. Deminicus
- Architectural style: Masonry vernacular
- MPS: Florida's Historic Black Public Schools MPS
- NRHP reference No.: 05001041
- Added to NRHP: September 15, 2005

Meacham Elementary School (1926–1971) was an elementary school for African American students in the South Nebraska neighborhood of Tampa, Florida. It is listed on the National Register of Historic Places since 2005, and listed as part of the Florida's Historic Black Public Schools Multiple Property Submission since 2003. It was also known as the India Street School, Christina Meacham Elementary School, Meacham Early Childhood School, and the Meacham Alternative School.

== History ==
The Meacham Elementary School was a two story building designed as masonry vernacular by architect I. A. Deminicus, and built by Louis W. Ross. It was opened in 1926, and named for Christina Meacham, who had served as principal of the Harlem Academy School, the city of Tampa's first Black school. Meacham Elementary School was the first modern facility in Tampa constructed for educating Black children. By 1927, it was only one of twenty eight African American schools in the state of Florida. In 1954, the Meacham Elementary School building was enlarged and nearly doubled in size.

== Closure and legacy ==
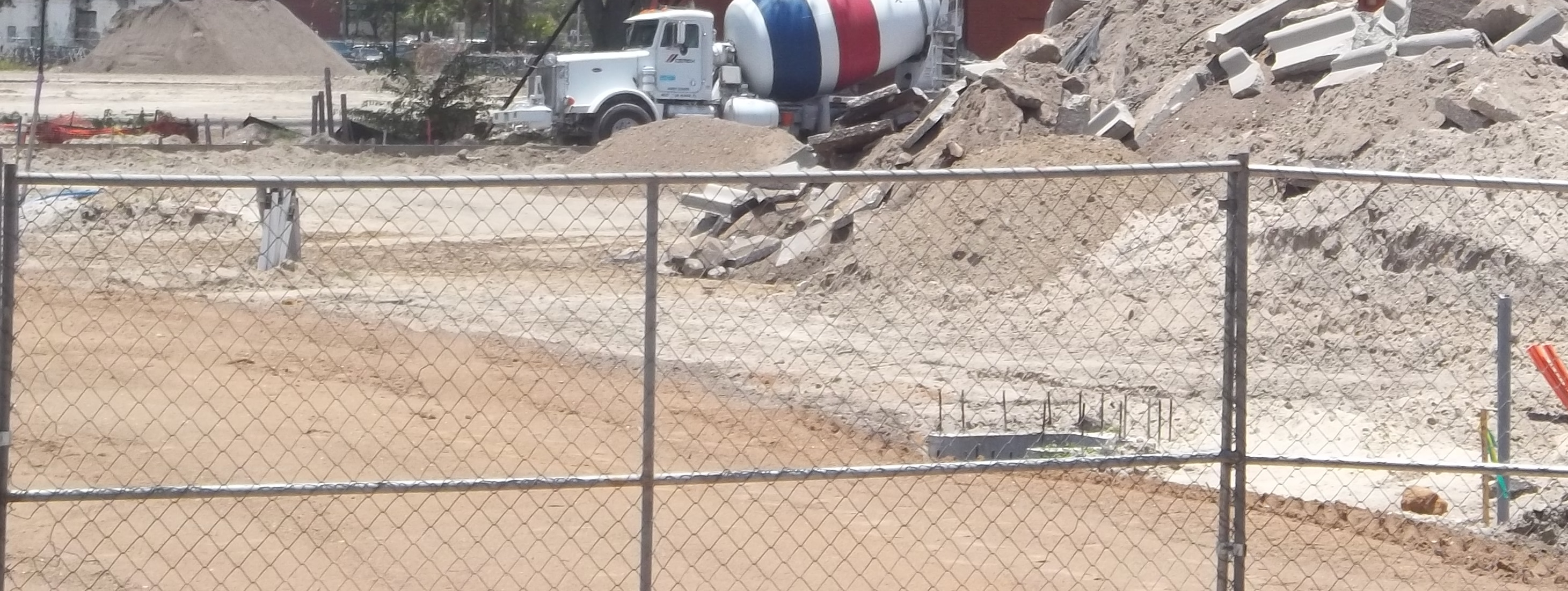
Site of the former Meacham Elementary School (2011)

The Meacham Elementary School closed in 1971, and the site became an integrated 6th grade center as part of the state desegregation plan. During the late 1970s the school building was transformed to an early childhood center named Meacham Early Childhood School, serving pre-kindergarten and kindergarten students.

In 2007, the former school building was demolished as part of a housing redevelopment project of the area.

== See also ==
- National Register of Historic Places listings in Tampa, Florida
