= St. Michael's Creole Benevolent Association Hall =

- U.S. National Register of Historic Places
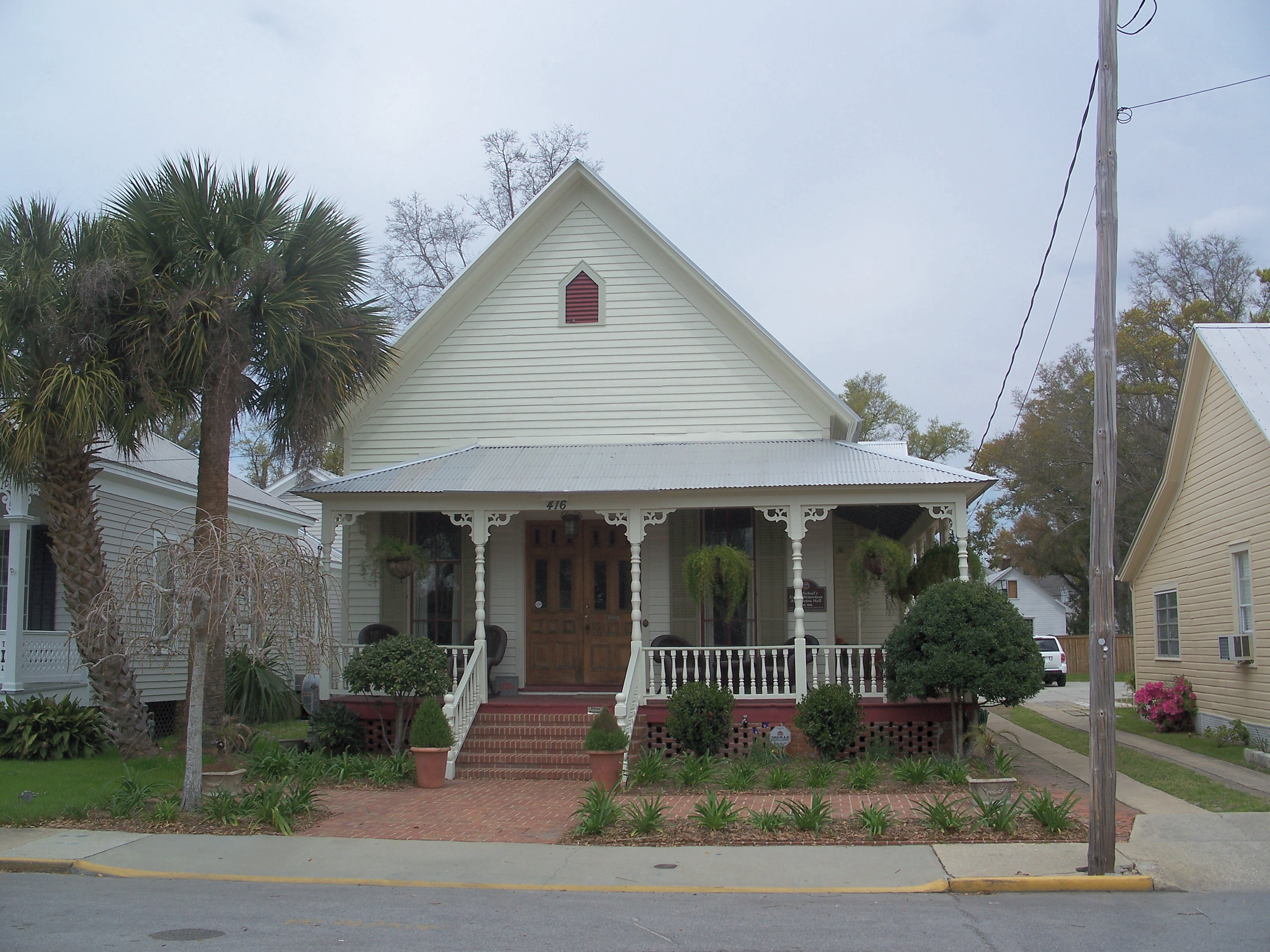

- Location within Florida Location within the United States
- Location: 416 E. Government St., Pensacola, Florida
- Coordinates: 30°24′37″N 87°12′33″W
- Area: 0.2 acres (0.081 ha)
- Architectural style: Frame Vernacular with Queen Anne elements
- NRHP reference No.: 74000623
- Added to NRHP: May 3, 1974

The St. Michael's Creole Benevolent Association Hall (also known as the St. Michael's Benevolent Social Club Hall) is a historic site in Pensacola, Florida. It is located at 416 East Government Street. On May 3, 1974, it was added to the U.S. National Register of Historic Places.

== Gallery ==
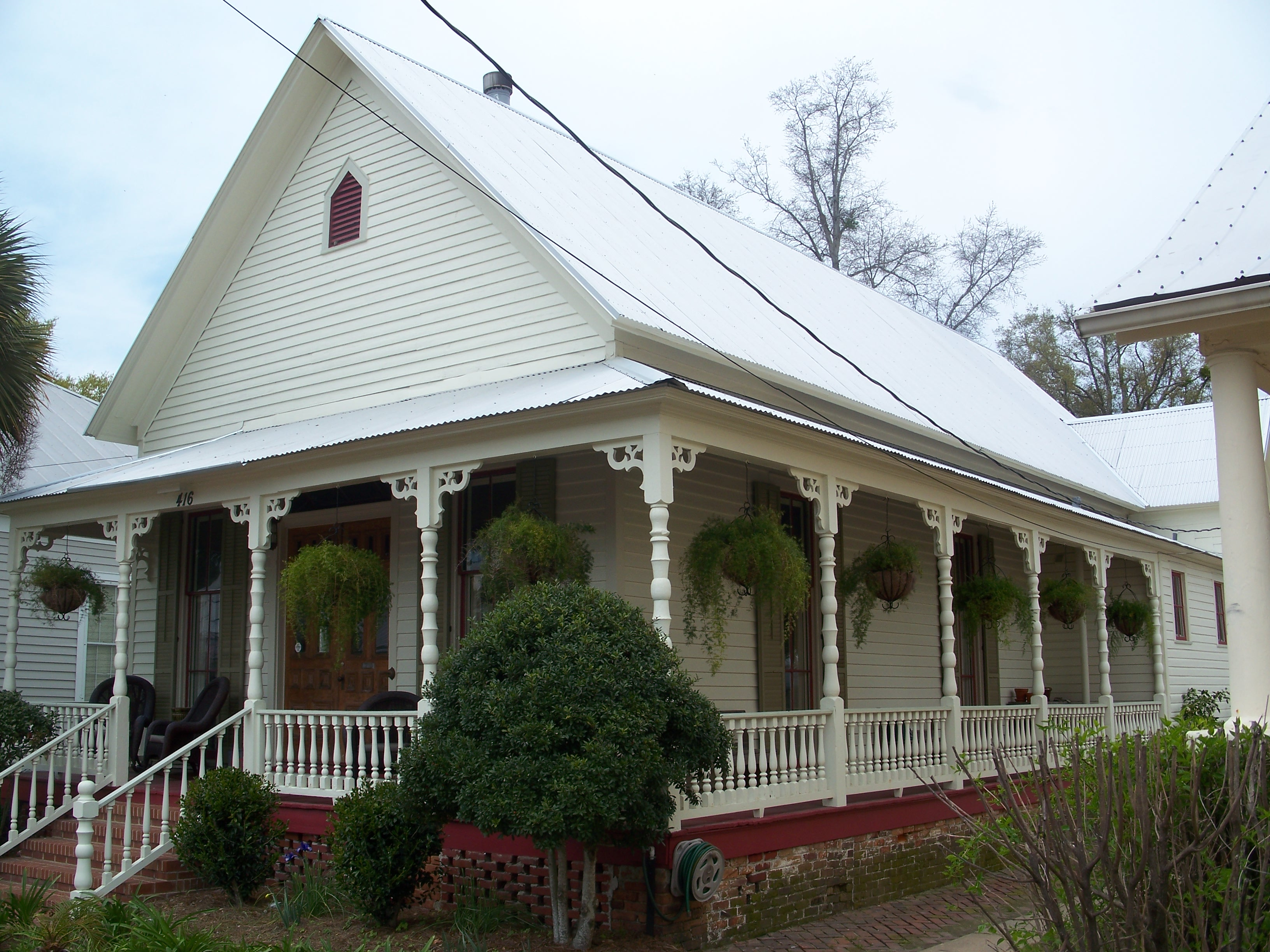

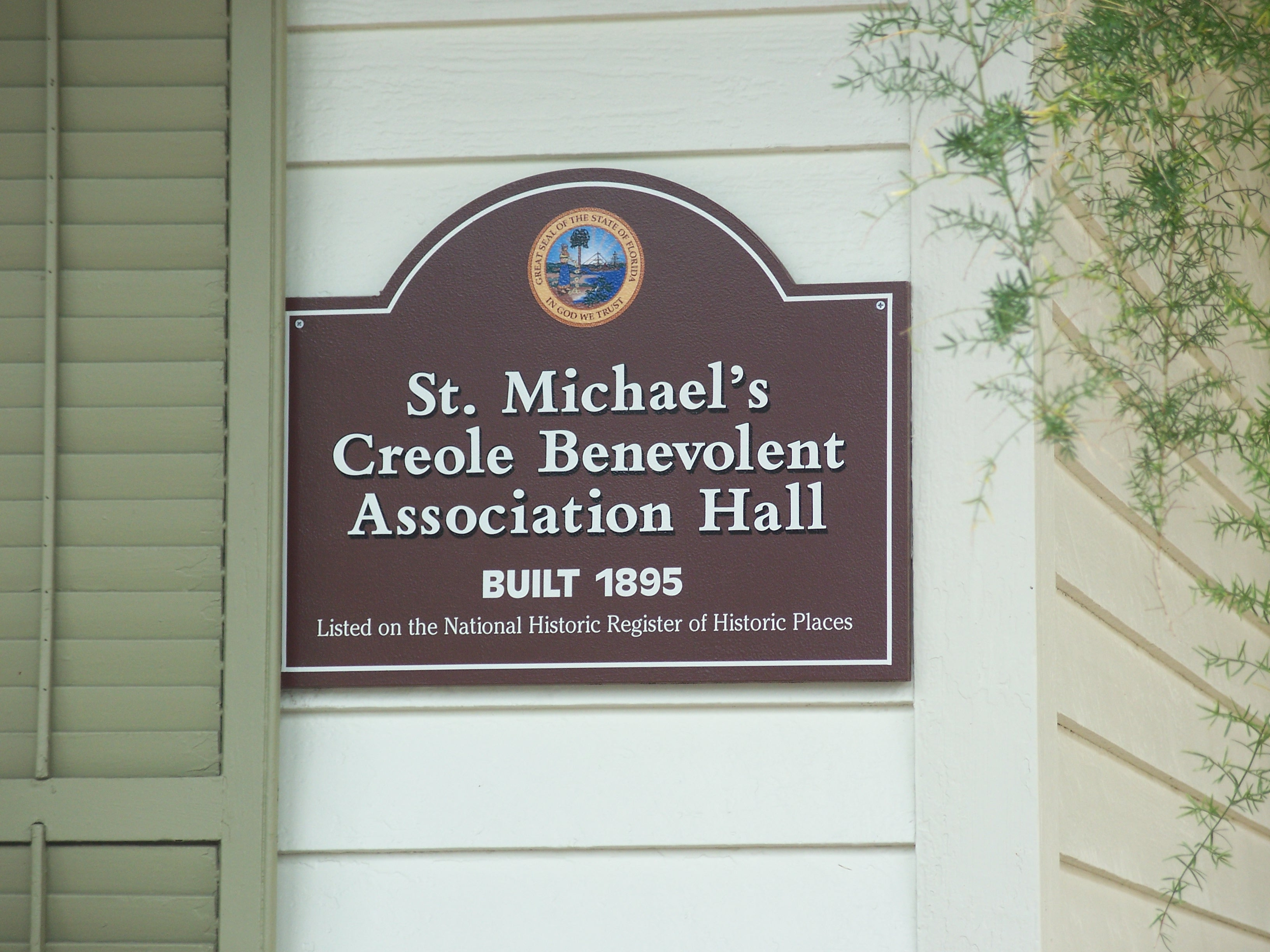
