= DeLeon Springs Colored School =

School in DeLeon Springs, Florida, US (1929–1969)

- U.S. National Register of Historic Places
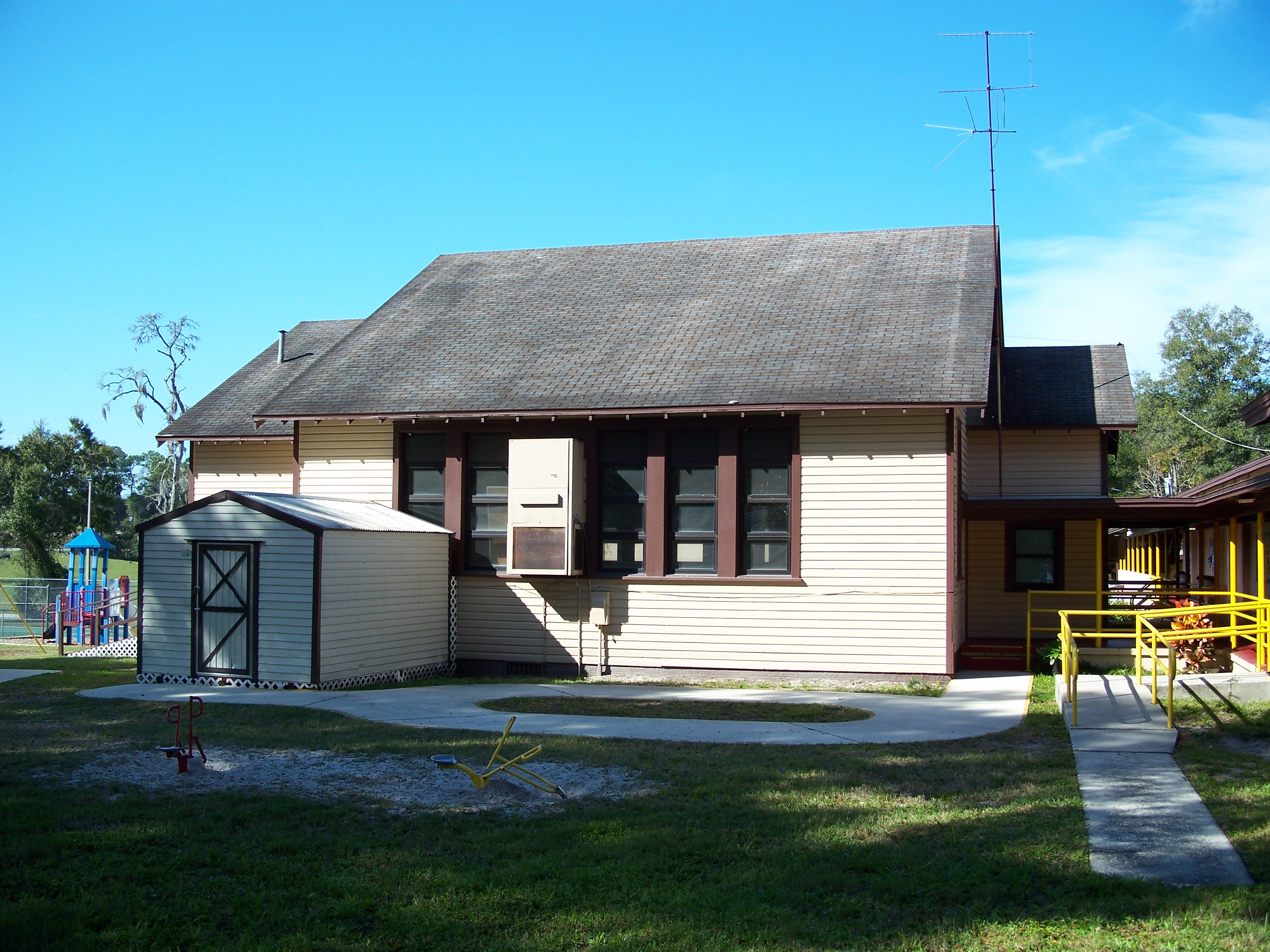

- Location within Florida
- Location: 330 East Retta Street, DeLeon Springs, Florida, U.S.
- Coordinates: 29°06′51″N 81°20′51″W
- Area: 2 acres (0.81 ha)
- Built: 1929
- Architect: Samuel L. Smith
- MPS: Florida's Historic Black Public Schools MPS
- NRHP reference No.: 03000702
- Added to NRHP: August 1, 2003

DeLeon Springs Colored School (1929–1969) was a Rosenwald school from 1st to 8th grade for African American students in DeLeon Springs, Florida. It is listed on the National Register of Historic Places since 2003, and listed as part of the Florida's Historic Black Public Schools Multiple Property Submission since 2003. The site also contains a historical marker. It was also known as Malloy Elementary School, Carrie L. Malloy Elementary School and now known Malloy Head Start.

== History ==
The Mt. Zion African Methodist Church held classes for African American student in the community of DeLeon Springs around 1900s, however the space was inadequate as a school, and classes were moved to St. Joseph Lodge. In July 1928, a committee of African American residents, including educator Carrie Malloy, approached the local school board regarding a site they had acquired for a new school. After the school board rebuffed their offer, the residents turned to Fred N. Burt for resources, a school trustee and real estate developer. Burt donated the 2 acres (0.81 ha) land. Early funding for the DeLeon Springs Colored School came from the Rosenwald Fund and the local community.

The school campus consists of three vernacular buildings: one frame building constructed in 1929 (as the 2-C floor plan for a two-teacher type community school), and two masonry buildings constructed in the 1950s. Historically, this school taught Black students from the 1st grade through the 8th grade.

DeLeon Springs School teachers included Carrie L. Malloy, Jamie B. Alien, Lou Alyce M. Reddick, Mary Turner Simmons, Eliza H. Staples, Mayo D. Staples, Annetta V. Stokes, Frankye A. Straughter, and Annie Mae Washington. In 1955, the school was renamed Malloy Elementary School in honor of former teacher Carrie L. Malloy.

In 1969, the DeLeon Springs School was closed during the integration of the Volusia County public school system.

== See also ==
- National Register of Historic Places listings in Volusia County, Florida
- List of Rosenwald schools
