= Orange City Colored School =

School in Orange City, Florida, US (1927–1969)

- U.S. National Register of Historic Places
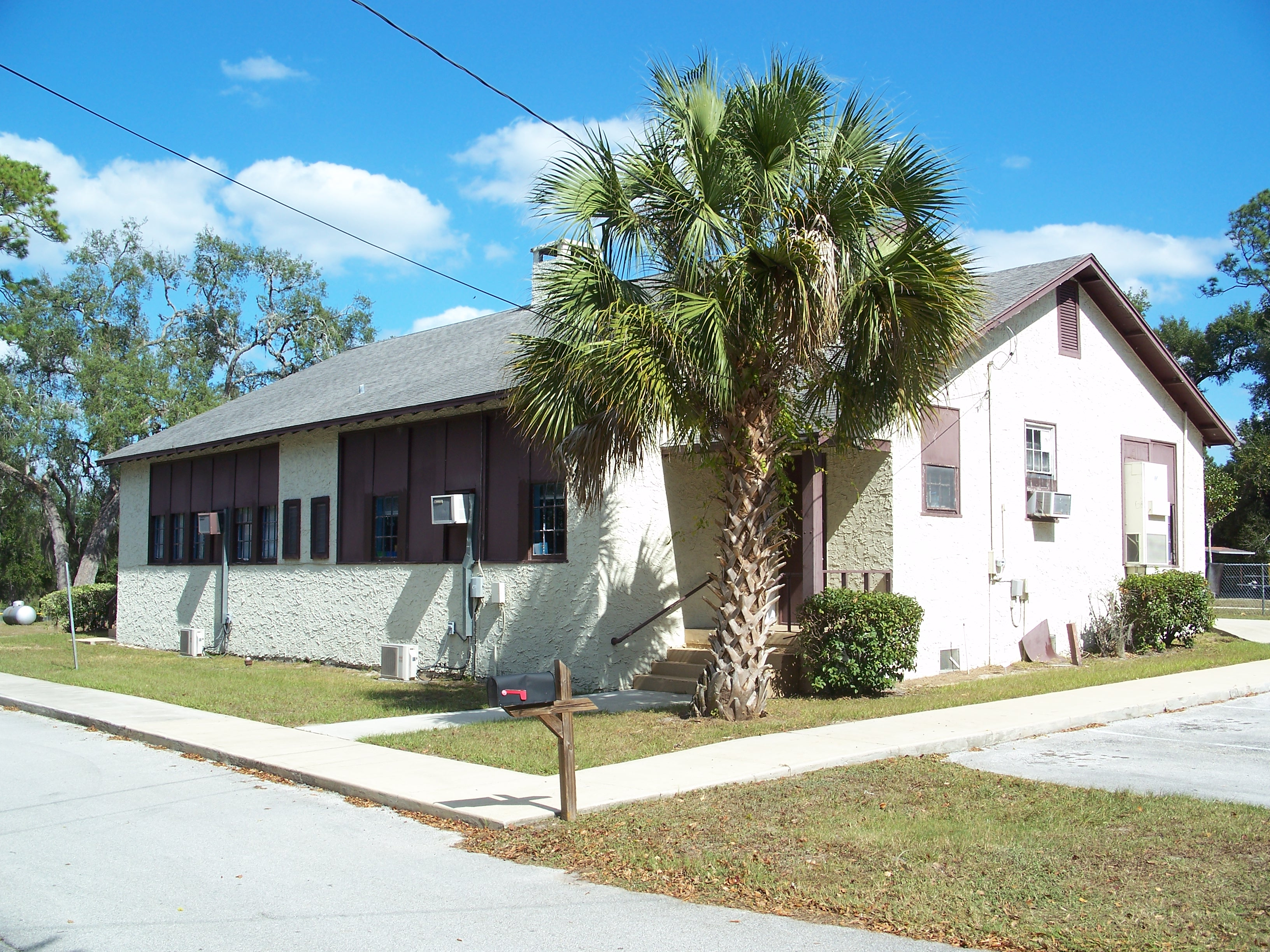

- Location within Florida
- Location: 200 East Blue Springs Ave., Orange City, Florida, US
- Coordinates: 28°56′19″N 81°17′49″W
- Area: 2 acres (0.81 ha)
- Built: 1927
- Architect: Samuel L. Smith, Herman J. Nordman
- MPS: Florida's Historic Black Public Schools MPS
- NRHP reference No.: 03000703
- Added to NRHP: August 1, 2003

Orange City Colored School (1927–1969) was a Rosenwald school from 1st to 8th grade for African American students in Orange City, Florida. It is listed on the National Register of Historic Places since 2003, and listed as part of the Florida's Historic Black Public Schools Multiple Property Submission since 2003. The site also contains a historical marker erected in 2016. It was also known as the Marian Coleman Elementary, and the Coleman Head Start Center.

== History ==
Starting in the 1880s various buildings had been adapted into classrooms for African American students including the Queen Bess Packing House, and the Odd Fellows Hall. There was an increased population in Orange City, Florida between 1920 and 1930, including African Americans. A small wood-frame building at the corner of Blue Springs Avenue and Volusia Avenue was no longer able to support the local Black communities needs by 1926.

Dr. Frances Dickinson donated a 5 acres (2.0 ha) of land for a new school. Early funding for the Orange City Colored School came from the Rosenwald Fund, the State of Florida, and Frances Dickinson. The building was designed by architect Samuel L. Smith, and used a Rosenwald approved floor plan (Floor Plan No. 400).

Historically, this school taught Black students from the 1st grade through the 8th grade, however by the late-1930s the Black population decreased and less of the upper grade classes were offered. Teachers at the Orange City Colored School included Marian Coleman, Eva King, Henry J. King, William A. King, Pauline Poole, Turie Thornton Small, T. E. Thornton, Rosa E. Williams, and Louis Young. In the early-1960s, it was renamed Marian Coleman Elementary School in honor of educator Marian L. Coleman (née Young).

In 1969, the Orange City Colored School was closed, and the students transported to schools in DeLand, Florida. The following year in 1970, the Orange City Community Interaction Committee leased the building from the Volusia County School Board. The building served various functions for the next decade, including as a community center, a recreation facility, and a church.

== See also ==
- National Register of Historic Places listings in Volusia County, Florida
- List of Rosenwald schools
