= Moore Memorial Park and Cultural Center =

Historic site in Mims, Florida

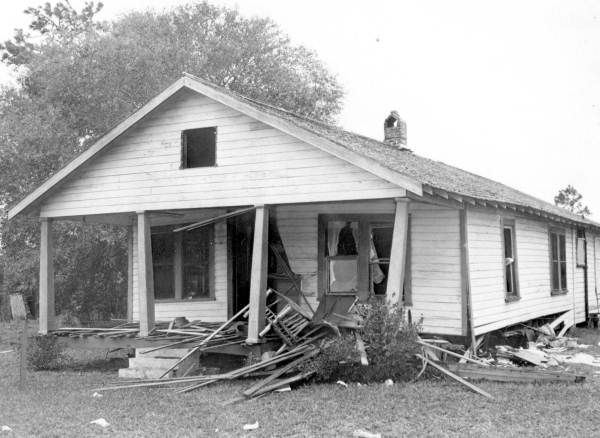
Photograph of the bombed out home of Harry T. Moore and Harriette V. Moore, December 25, 1951

Moore Memorial Park and Cultural Center is a historic site in Mims, Florida where the home of civil rights leader Harry T. Moore was located. The site now houses a museum, conference center and park.

== History ==
Harry T. Moore was a teacher and civil rights leader who organized a variety of initiatives in Florida. He founded the first chapter of the NAACP in Brevard County and in 1938, sued the school district in order to receive equal pay for black teachers. Gilbert v. Board of Public Instruction of Brevard County reached the Florida Supreme Court, where the court ruled in favor of the district.

On December 25, 1951, Moore and his wife were assassinated when a bomb was placed under their house. They are believed to be the first civil rights activists to be assassinated during the movement.

In 1994, Brevard County bought the land where the Moore's house once stood. A nonprofit organization was organized to raise money for the site, and in 2004 the cultural complex was dedicated. The cultural complex includes a museum and a replica of their home.

The grounds of the center also include a 12-acre landscaped park with paths, reflecting pool, fountain, and gazebo.

The Harry T. & Harriette V. Moore Memorial Park & Museum is an official landmark site of the United States Civil Right Trail.

== See also ==
- African Americans in Florida
- Florida Black Heritage Trail
- Florida African American Heritage Preservation Network
- Florida Civil Rights Hall of Fame
