= Jesse Delbert Daniels =

Framed and held without trial (b. 1938, d. 2018)

Jesse Delbert Daniels (September 25, 1938 – June 21, 2018) was a disabled Florida man who was held in the Florida State Hospital for 14 years without ever standing trial after being accused of raping a woman in Okahumpka, Florida and being declared unfit to stand trial by Judge Truman Futch, who was also involved in the Groveland Four trial and who denied an effort to prosecute Sheriff Willis McCall after he shot two of the accused during an alleged escape attempt while they were handcuffed together and being transported in the sheriff's custody. Daniels was held at Florida State Hospital in Chattahoochee. Author Gilbert King wrote the book Beneath a Ruthless Sun about the events.

Daniels was born in Leesburg, Florida.

Journalist Mabel Norris Reese helped bring attention to his case and lawyer Richard Graham worked pro bono on appeals that eventually resulted in his being freed. He was compensated $75,000. After his release, he worked as an assistant cook at a hotel where his mother was a maid and did odd jobs. He rode a bicycle in Daytona Beach and enjoyed old country songs and playing guitar.
