= La Grange Church and Cemetery =

Church in Florida, United States

- U.S. National Register of Historic Places
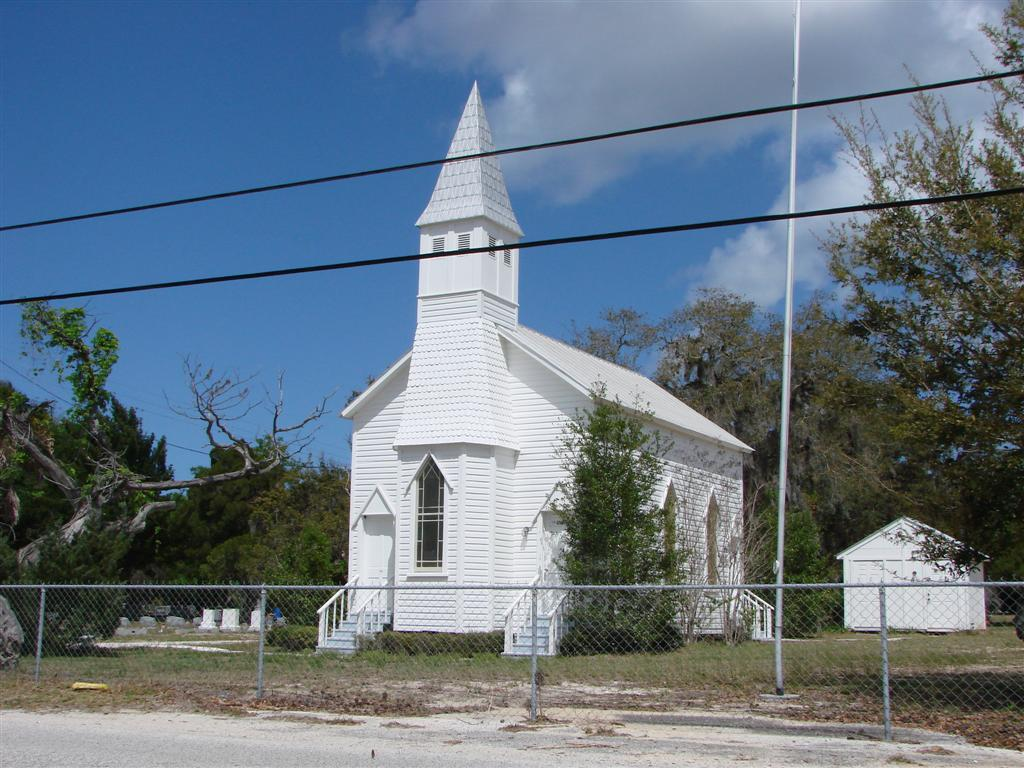
- La Grange Church

- Location within Florida Location within the United States
- Location: 1575 Old Dixie Highway; Titusville, Florida
- Coordinates: 28°38′22.2″N 80°50′13.6″W
- Built: 1869
- NRHP reference No.: 95001413
- Added to NRHP: December 7, 1995

The La Grange Church and Cemetery is a historic Carpenter Gothic church and cemetery in Titusville, Florida, United States. It is located at 1575 Old Dixie Highway. On December 7, 1995, it was added to the U.S. National Register of Historic Places.

== National Register listing ==
- La Grange Church and Cemetery
- (added 1995 - Building - #95001413)
- Also known as FMSF# 8DR454*
- 1575 Old Dixie Hwy., Titusville
- Historic Significance: Architecture/Engineering, Event
- Architect, builder, or engineer: Mims, B.J., et al., Feasterr, J.N. & J.C.C.
- Area of Significance: Architecture, Social History
- Period of Significance: 1875–1899, 1900–1924, 1925–1949
- Owner: Private
- Historic Function: Funerary, Religion
- Historic Sub-function: Cemetery, Religious Structure
- Current Function: Funerary, Vacant/Not In Use
- Current Sub-function: Cemetery

== Notable burials ==
- Harriette Moore (1902–1952). School teacher and social reformer, killed by a planted bomb in her home
- Harry T. Moore (1905–1951). Teacher and civil right activist and husband of Harriette, killed by the same bomb
- Henry T. Titus (1823–1881). Pioneer, soldier of fortune, and founder of Titusville

== See also ==
- National Register of Historic Places listings in Florida
