= Devil in the Grove =

2012 nonfiction book by Gilbert King

Devil in the Grove: Thurgood Marshall, the Groveland Boys, and the Dawn of a New America
- First edition
- Author: Gilbert King
- Published: 2012
- Publisher: HarperCollins

Devil in the Grove: Thurgood Marshall, the Groveland Boys, and the Dawn of a New America is a 2012 nonfiction book by the American author Gilbert King. It is a history of the attorney Thurgood Marshall's defense of four young black men in Lake County, Florida, who were accused in 1949 of raping a white woman. They were known as the Groveland Boys. Marshall led a team from the NAACP Legal Defense Fund. Published by Harper, the book was awarded the 2013 Pulitzer Prize for General Nonfiction. The Pulitzer Committee described it as "a richly detailed chronicle of racial injustice."

== Description ==
In 1949, Florida's orange industry was booming, and citrus barons got rich on the backs of African-American laborers, who worked under Jim Crow laws and had been disenfranchised by the state constitution since the turn of the century and struggled for justice in the white supremacist state. The planters relied on Sheriff Willis V. McCall to keep order in Lake County, where he was known for his harsh actions against blacks. A white 17-year-old Groveland girl said she had been raped by blacks, and McCall soon arrested four young black men.

Thurgood Marshall, known as "Mr. Civil Rights" and one of the most important American lawyers of the 20th century, entered the fray and represented the suspects for the NAACP Legal Defense Fund. The US Supreme Court overturned the convictions and returned the case to the state for retrial. Members of the Ku Klux Klan came to town, burned the homes of blacks to the ground, and chased hundreds into the swamps, as they were intent on lynching the young men who came to be known as "the Groveland Boys." The Ku Klux Klan initiated a wave of violence, shot two of the defendants, and killed one.

Associates feared for Marshall's life during the time of the "Florida Terror" and worried that he was irreplaceable to the burgeoning Civil Rights Movement. Marshall was determined to fight for the case. The Klan murdered one of his NAACP associates, Harry T. Moore, who was involved with the case in Florida, and Marshall received numerous threats that he would be next.

King drew on a wealth of never-before-published material, including the FBI's unredacted Groveland case files. He also gained unprecedented access to the NAACP's Legal Defense Fund files. He both explored the work of Marshall and set his narrative against the case that US Supreme Court Justice Robert H. Jackson decried as "one of the best examples of one of the worst menaces to American justice."

== Reception ==
In 2013, this book won the Pulitzer Prize for General Nonfiction. It won runner-up for the 2013 Dayton Literary Peace Prize. Thomas Friedman of The New York Times described Devil in the Grove as a "must-read, cannot-put-down history."

In addition to being named to several "Best Books of 2012" lists by newspapers such as The Christian Science Monitor and The Boston Globe, Devil in the Grove was nominated in 2013 for the Chautauqua Prize and an Edgar Award for Best Fact Crime.

The Christian Science Monitor noted that

"King's style, at once suspenseful and historically meticulous, advances the facts of the Groveland case while simultaneously weaving together details from Marshall's professional rise within the NAACP and his home life in Harlem ... Devil is a compelling look at the case that forged Thurgood Marshall's perception of himself as a crusader for civil rights ... The story of the Thurgood Marshall and his Groveland Boys reminds us that man's capacity for evil may be deep, but so is his capacity for change."

Booklist called it "Gripping ... Lively and multidimensional." It received a starred review from Kirkus Reviews, which described it as "[a] thoroughgoing study of one of the most important civil-rights cases argued by Thurgood Marshall in dismantling Jim Crow strictures. ... Deeply researched and superbly composed."

== Adaptations ==
Lionsgate acquired the rights to the book in 2013, deeming the project a "high priority". Anton Corbijn is going to direct the movie based on this book
