= Florida Civil Rights Hall of Fame =

Hall of fame in Florida

The Florida Civil Rights Hall of Fame honors people who have worked on behalf of civil rights in Florida. It is located in the Florida State Capitol and is administered by the Florida Department of Management Services. It was created in 2010 by unanimous vote of both houses of the Florida Legislature.

In 2019, Florida governor Ron DeSantis added three inductees: attorney Daniel Webster Perkins, Dr. Charles Ullman Smith, and Henry “Hank” James Thomas.

== Inductees ==
This is a sortable table. Click on "Year" and it will sort by year. Click on "Name" and it will aort by first name. The source, which has the person's home town or county and reason for inclusion, is Florida Civil Rights Hall of Fame Inductees, consulted February 6, 2022.

Name	Year	Comment
Marvin Davies	2018	
John Dorsey Due, Jr.	2018	
Willie Oliver Wells, Sr.	2018	Reverend Dr.
Patricia Stephens Due	2017	civil rights activist
Arnett Girardeau	2017	Dr.
Willie H. Williams	2017	
Reubin Askew	2015	Governor
Edward Daniel Davis	2015	
Sallye Brooks Mathis	2015	
Robert Hayling	2014	Dr.
James Weldon Johnson	2014	writer, diplomat, NAACP leader
Asa Philip Randolph	2014	civil rights and labor activist
Harry T. Moore and Harriette V. Moore	2013	teachers, civil rights activist
Margarita Romo	2013	
James B. Sanderlin	2013	Judge
Mary McLeod Bethune	2012	educator, founder of Bethune College, civil rights activist
Claude Pepper	2012	U.S. Senator
Charles Kenzie Steele	2012	Led Tallahassee bus boycott and the fight to desegregate restaurants in Tallahassee.
Earl M. Johnson	2016	
Jesse McCrary Jr.	2016	
Rutledge Henry Pearson	2016	
Daniel Webster Perkins	2019	
Charles Ullman Smith	2019	
Hank James Thomas	2019	

== See also ==
- Florida Artists Hall of Fame
- St. Augustine Movement
