= Jason Flom =

American music executive

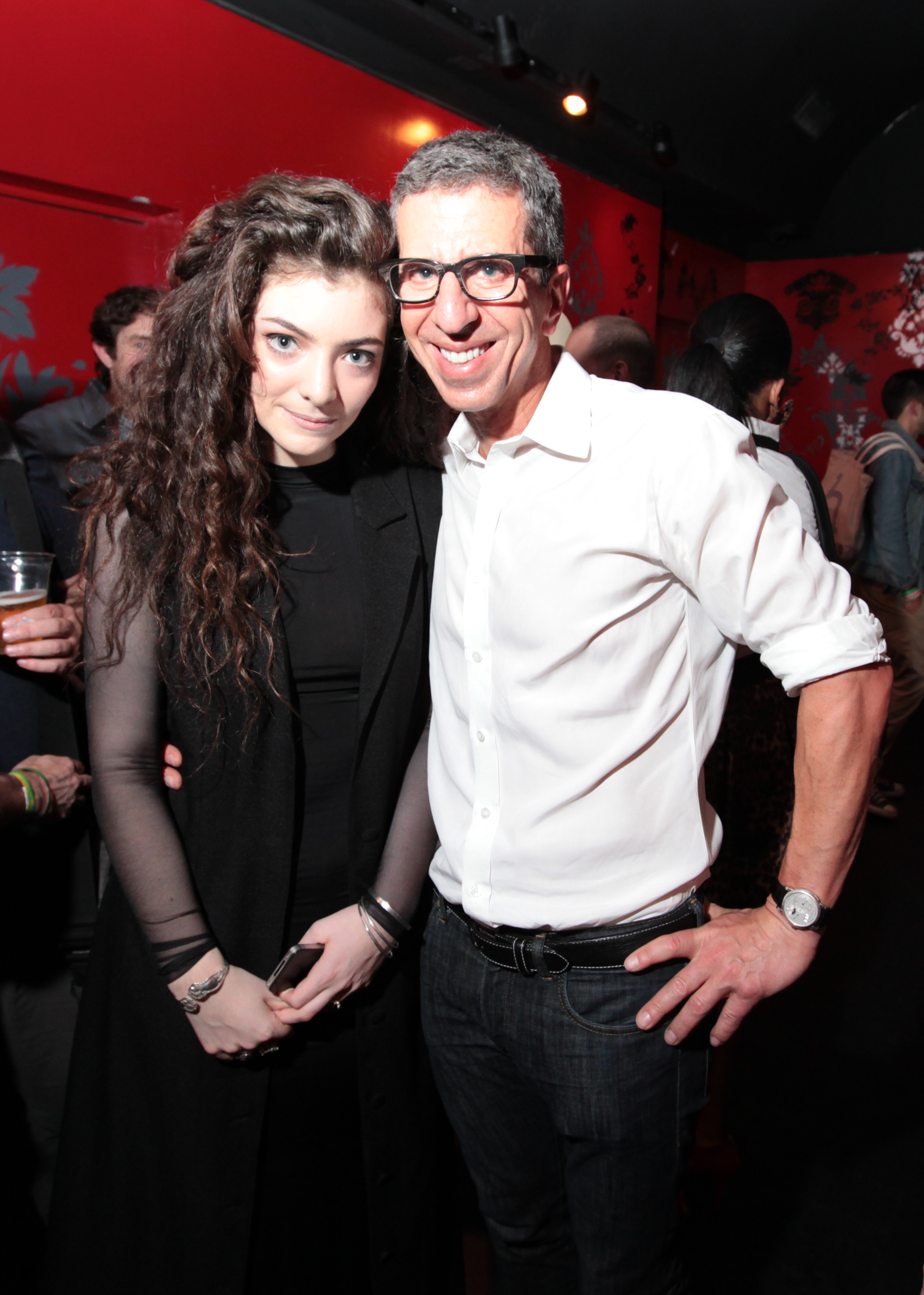
- Jason Flom with Lorde, 2013
- Born: February 17, 1961 (age 65); New York City, New York
- Occupations: Music industry executive, podcaster, philanthropist
- Spouses: Wendy Berry (divorced); Khaliah Ali (m. 2024)
- Children: 2
- Father: Joseph Flom

Jason Flom (born February 17, 1961) is an American music industry executive, podcaster and philanthropist. He is the founder of Lava Records, and previously served as the chairman of Atlantic Records, Virgin Records and Capitol Music Group. He is also known for his advocacy on behalf of individuals who have been wrongfully convicted.

== Career ==
=== Early Career and Atlantic Records ===
In 1979, while a college freshman at New York University, Flom got a job as a trainee field merchandiser at Atlantic Records hanging posters in record stores. In 1981, he moved to the sales research team and, in 1983, into Atlantic's A&R department. At 20, Flom departed NYU to work full-time at Atlantic. Bands he signed at the time included Skid Row and Stone Temple Pilots.

=== Lava Records ===
In 1995, Flom launched Lava Records in partnership with Atlantic Records.

In 2004, Flom sold Lava Records to Atlantic Records Group, where he was named chairman and CEO. Flom was named chairman and CEO of Virgin Records in 2005. In 2007, after Capitol Records merged with Virgin Records, Capitol Music Group was created, where he was named chairman and CEO. In 2007 he signed Katy Perry. In 2008, Flom left Capitol Music Group to re-launch his own Lava Records label, this time in partnership with Universal Music Group's Republic Records. In 2013, Flom signed Lorde to Lava, which released her debut single, "Royals."

Flom founded Lava Publishing in 2014, which has published writing from Maty Noyes, and Greta Van Fleet. He also founded Lava Media with Jeff Kempler, a multimedia company encompassing recorded music, publishing, and podcasting ventures.

== Notable A&R/production acts ==
- Twisted Sister
- Skid Row
- Stone Temple Pilots
- Edwin McCain
- Kid Rock
- Tori Amos
- Maty Noyes
- Jessie J
- Lorde
- The Warning
- Trans-Siberian Orchestra
- White Lion
- Greta Van Fleet
- Katy Perry
- Matchbox Twenty
- Black Veil Brides
- Jewel
- Sugar Ray
- Collective Soul
- Paramore
- 30 Seconds to Mars
- The Corrs
- Escape Club
- Donna Lewis
- Simple Plan

== Personal life ==
Flom is the son of Joseph Flom (1923–2011), a lawyer and partner at Skadden, Arps, Slate, Meagher & Flom, and Claire Flom (1924–2007), a philanthropist who co-founded the Gateway School.

Flom's first marriage was to Wendy Berry. They had two children, Allison and Michael. On October 6, 2024, Flom married Khaliah Ali, a daughter of Muhammad Ali, in Southampton, New York.

Flom has said that his interest in criminal justice was influenced in part by his own experiences with substance abuse and his awareness of disparities in how similar cases are treated.

== Criminal justice advocacy ==
In 1993, he joined the board of Families Against Mandatory Minimums (FAMM) and soon after became a founding board member of the Innocence Project. Inspired by his work with the Innocence Project, Flom launched the podcast Wrongful Conviction with Jason Flom in 2016. The podcast features interviews with men and women who have spent time in prison for crimes evidence shows they did not commit as well as prominent attorneys, activists, advocates and experts.

Notable guests on the podcast include Kim Kardashian, John Grisham, Meek Mill, Amanda Knox, Raymond Santana, Brendan Dassey, and Rodney Reed, among others. The podcast reached #7 on the iTunes charts within its first 2 weeks of release, and has since been downloaded over 50 million times.

Flom has served on the board of the Drug Policy Alliance and has successfully advocated for criminal justice reform, including efforts related to clemency grants from various Governors and for nonviolent drug offenders during the administrations of Bill Clinton and Barack Obama. Flom also sits on the board of directors of the Legal Action Center, which uses legal and policy strategies to fight discrimination, build health equity, and restore opportunity for people with criminal records, substance use disorders, and HIV or AIDS. He also serves as a board member of Injustice Watch and The Frederick Douglass Project For Justice.

=== Lava for Good ===
In 2018, Flom founded Lava for Good. Its podcast series are hosted by human rights and justice experts, activists, attorneys, journalists, as well as formerly incarcerated persons. The Lava for Good lineup includes Wrongful Conviction, Wrongful Conviction with Maggie Freleng, Righteous Convictions with Jason Flom, Bone Valley, Erased: The Murder of Elma Sands with Allison Williams, The War on Drugs, False Confessions, Earwitness, Absolute, as well as Junk Science.

Lava for Good's podcast network has been credited with influencing numerous exonerations, clemencies, pardons, and criminal justice reform efforts. The first season of “Bone Valley” focused on the case of Leo Schofield, who was granted parole in 2024 after more than 36 years of incarceration.

Podcasts produced by Lava for Good have received recognition from organizations including the Ambie Awards, Signal Awards, and Webby Awards. In 2021, Lava for Good received a Webby Award in the Crime & Justice category for Wrongful Conviction: False Confessions. In 2022, Lava for Good won a Silver Anthem Award for Human & Civil Rights - Best Strategy. Wrongful Conviction and Wrongful Conviction with Maggie Freleng were honored with Silver and Bronze/Listener's Choice Awards, respectively, at the first inaugural Signal Awards announced in January 2023. In 2024, Lava for Good was named Podcast Network of the Year by Adweek.

== Awards ==
- 1999 - Torch of Liberty Award, American Civil Liberties Union
- 2000 - Music Visionary of the Year, UJA Federation
- 2004 - Social Justice Award, Correctional Association of New York
- 2005 - Humanitarian Award, T.J. Martell Foundation
- 2008 - Partner in Pursuit of Justice, Bronx Defenders; Ambassador Award, City of Hope
- 2009 - Award for Freedom and Justice, Innocence Project
- 2014 - Spirit of Life Award, Rush Philanthropic Arts Foundation
- 2017 - Honored by the Innocence Project of New Orleans
- 2022 - Clio Music Impact Award, Clio Awards
- 2023 - Lifetime Achievement Award, Muhammad Ali Humanitarian Awards

== Children's media and publishing ==
In 2018, Flom co-wrote the children's book Lulu Is a Rhinoceros with his daughter Allison Flom. The book follows a bulldog named Lulu who identifies as a rhinoceros.

The book was later adapted into an animated musical special for Apple TV+, starring Auli'i Cravalho as the voice of Lulu, which premiered globally on May 30, 2025.
