= Mabel Norris Reese =

American journalist

Mabel Norris Reese (July 2, 1914 - January 1, 1995) was a civil rights activist and journalist, editor and owner of the Mount Dora Topic newspaper from 1947 to 1960. A book written about the NAACP's defense of the Groveland Four by Gilbert King won the Pulitzer Prize and discussed her mixed reporting on that event. Her induction into the Lake County, Florida Women's Hall of Fame and subsequent commemoration with a bust by sculptor Jim McNalis in 2020 memorialized the crusading journalist's fight against the Ku Klux Klan. Devil in the Grove was a nonfiction book about the 4 Groveland African-American youths accused of the rape of a white woman in 1949. The Groveland Four were pardoned by Gov. Ron DeSantis in January 2019.

== Mount Dora ==
She edited the Mount Dora Topic, a small weekly newspaper that was dependent on local ads from the Lake County region near Orlando, Florida, at a time when segregation was still the rule and the local sheriff was taken at his word. After two prisoners were shot while escaping his custody, Reese began to question the narrative sheriff Willis McCall was expounding and began believing he was not being forthcoming. By reporting in opposition she became the target of racism, the family dog was poisoned, her house firebombed and a cross was burned on her lawn, forcing her to relocate from Mount Dora. A rival paper was started and her advertisers were told not to use her paper, causing damage to her business model as a result of her reporting on McCall. After interviewing the surviving prisoner and realizing that what the sheriff had been telling her was a lie, she then began exposing the sheriff and the Ku Klux Klan in her reporting. The death penalty case went to the Florida supreme court, which reversed the decision.

During the 1940s, Reese had backed the notorious racist lawman. His stubborn support of anti-miscegenation and pro-segregation is what landed him in a national story, the November 17, 1972 edition of Life magazine headlined, "High and Mighty Sheriff". In the 1950s, her skepticism of the sheriff led to his denouncing her as a liar and a communist, resulting in her frequent editorials against Stalinism and the evils of the communist system in Russia.

Reese was also instrumental in the re-admittance of four students of Irish-Indian background who McCall banned from going to school in Lake County after he decided that they were 'black'. For the stories of the Platt family children she was nominated for a Pulitzer Prize. The story drew national attention to her feud with Sheriff McCall and resulted in Newsweek and Time magazine articles, many readers wrote in support of her position gaining her national recognition. She was key in calling for the exoneration of a mentally disabled man also accused of raping a white woman in nearby Okahumpka county and getting his freedom from a mental ward after 14 years of incarceration. She wrote stories of supreme court justices and cases, interviewing civil rights icon Martin Luther King Jr. at the start of the Civil rights era. An early proponent of Civil rights for the poor and the workers who picked the oranges in Lake County, she also championed something that was unpopular in the 1950s, Environmental Legislation.

== Pulitzer ==
In 2012, King's book Devil in the Grove told the story of attorney Thurgood Marshall's defense of four young black men in Lake County, Florida, who were accused in 1949 of raping a white woman. They were known as the Groveland Boys. Marshall led a team from the NAACP Legal Defense Fund. Published by Harper, the book was awarded the 2013 Pulitzer Prize for General Nonfiction. The Pulitzer Committee described it as "a richly detailed chronicle of racial injustice". The wrongful conviction of black men and summary execution by police in Lake county, Florida became front-page news in 1949 after a posse of 1000 men led by Sheriff McCall shot one of the suspects 400 times. The first death penalty conviction for two of the suspects was overturned by the U.S.Supreme Court and sent back for retrial. McCall picked up the suspects to return them to the county seat, claiming tire trouble enroute he stopped and shot both men who he said attacked him. One feigned death and when a deputy arrived, the deputy shot him as he lay handcuffed on the ground. Taken to the hospital, he told the FBI and reporters that it was a set-up by the sheriff. Tipped by the D.A. that the story wasn't as being told by the sheriff and his deputies, the Topic posted an op-ed questioning the shooting. Mabel Reese, who with her husband and daughter lived with her parents, then became the target of racist violence; yet she persisted, reporting on Sheriff McCall when the community did not support removing the racist. Dead fish were dumped on her porch and the house was twice targeted by bombs. She wrote an editorial reviling the KKK, with a photo of her holding her dog in front of a burning cross in her yard, indicating she did not fear the antics of the group. McCall and other klansmen returned two days later and poisoned the dog. They painted KKK on the front of the newspaper office and began a campaign of harassment against the journalist.

In 2017, the State of Florida and the Orlando Sentinel (then the Orlando Morning Sentinel) formally apologized for the Miscarriage of justice where the paper described its then coverage of the case before the Grand jury met as "inflammatory" and conducive to misinformed public opinion about the guilt of the 4 men.

== Honors ==
The Topic stories about false charges, police beatings, and the death of persons in Lake County primarily focused on the poor and persons of color, which was not supported at the time but ultimately was the correct course taken by Reese, leading to her commemoration in 2020 with a bust and tribute in Mount Dora. Mount Dora activist Gary McKechnie started a "Remember Mabel" campaign, raising the funds for a terra cotta sculpted bust that incorporated things like dirt from her former front yard that was firebombed and details like the replica MR key from her typewriter. Lake County Commissioner Leslie Campione, in presenting the honor, said, "She exposed wrongdoing, and she fought to make things right". She was also nominated to the Florida women's hall of fame in 2019 but was not a finalist. Reese was the first recipient of the Courage in Journalism award named for abolitionist editor Elijah Parish Lovejoy, a victim of mob violence after they repeatedly destroyed his printing press. The state press association gave her awards for both news and editorial writing, and to the Topic for best weekly newspaper in 1955.

== Death ==
Mabel and her husband Paul H. Reese divorced in 1960 and they sold the Mount Dora Topic. She moved to Daytona Beach with their daughter, Patricia, where she wrote columns for the Daytona Beach News. Patricia died in August 2017, at the age of 74. Mabel remarried to A. Chesley. She passed at home in Daytona Beach in 1995 at age 80.

== See also ==
- Robert H. Jackson
- Harry T. Moore
