= Emil Yde =

American baseball player (1900–1968)

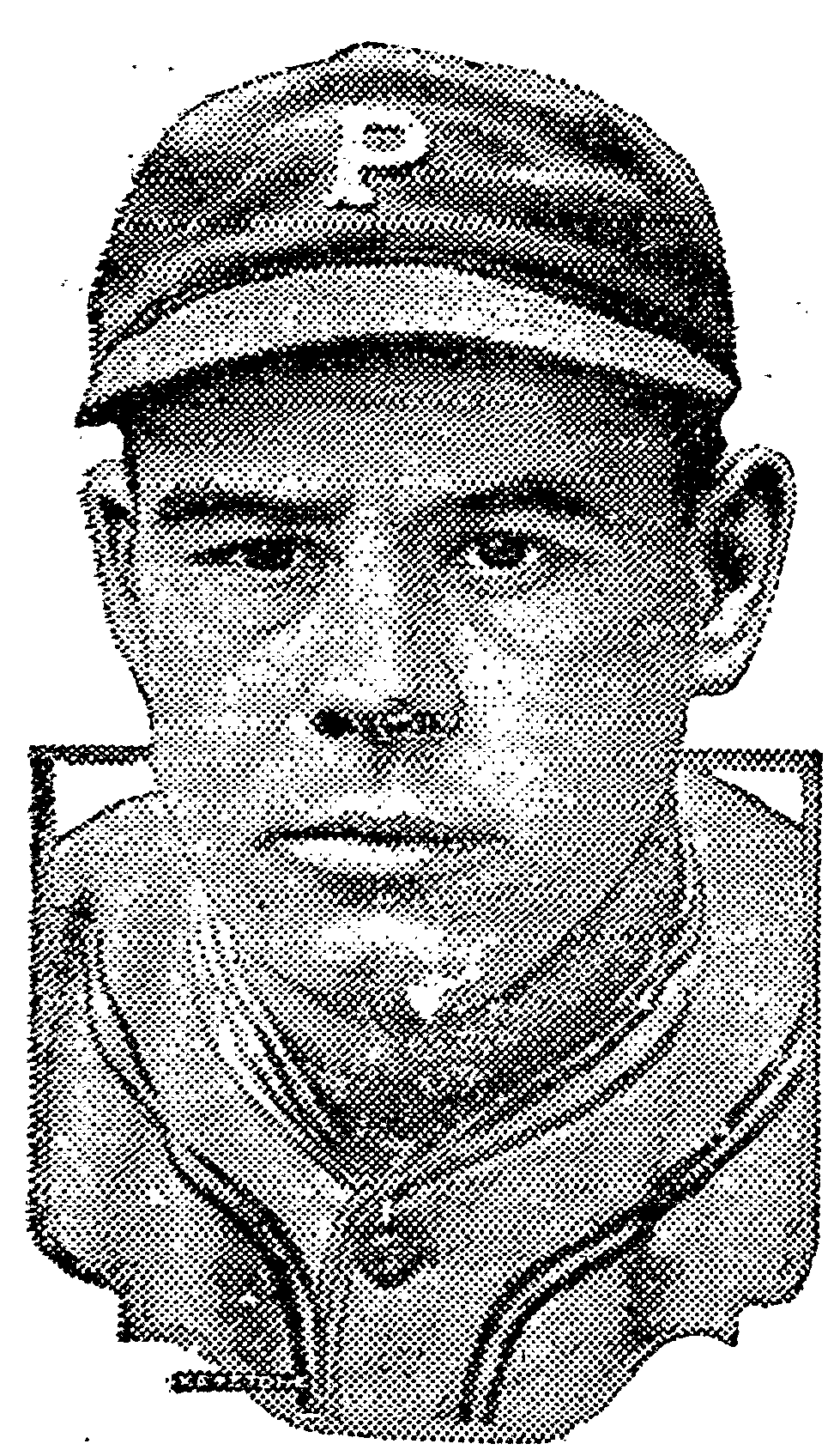
- Pitcher
- Born: January 28, 1900; Great Lakes, Illinois, U.S.
- Died: December 4, 1968 (aged 68); Leesburg, Florida, U.S.
- Batted: Both Threw: Left

MLB debut
- April 21, 1924, for the Pittsburgh Pirates

Last MLB appearance
- October 3, 1929, for the Detroit Tigers

MLB statistics
- Win–loss record: 49–25
- Earned run average: 4.02
- Strikeouts: 160
- Stats at Baseball Reference

Teams
- Pittsburgh Pirates (1924–27); Detroit Tigers (1929)

Career highlights and awards
- World Series champion (1925)

Emil Ogden Yde (January 28, 1900 – December 4, 1968) was an American left-handed professional baseball pitcher. He played all or part of four seasons in Major League Baseball for the Pittsburgh Pirates (1924–27) and Detroit Tigers in 1929. As a rookie in 1924, Yde led the National League in shutouts with four and in winning percentage (.842) with a Win–loss record of 16–3.

In 1925, Yde became the first pitcher ever to allow back-to-back home runs in a World Series when Goose Goslin and Joe Harris hit consecutive homers in the third inning of the fourth game of the series.

He also was a good hitting pitcher in his brief major league career, posting a .233 batting average (74-for-317) with 46 runs, 1 home run and 28 RBI.

Yde was of Danish descent. His father worked at Naval Station Great Lakes and later as a superintendent at a coal yard. Yde attended both the University of Wisconsin–Madison and the University of Illinois at Urbana–Champaign. He served in the United States Navy during World War I.

He moved to Leesburg, Florida during his playing career and eventually became a real estate dealer there. In 1944, he ran for sheriff of Lake County, Florida but lost in the Democratic Party primary to Willis V. McCall.
