= Charles Greenlee =

Charles Greenlee may refer to:

- Charles Greenlee, one of the Groveland Four
- Charles Greenlee (musician) (1927–1993), American jazz trombonist
