= Meridian Civil Rights Trail =

Historic area of Meridian, Mississippi, United States

The Meridian Civil Rights Trail is a heritage trail in Meridian, Mississippi in the United States. It was created in 2014 by the Meridian and Lauderdale County Tourism Bureau in consultation with a committee of local residents to highlight the history of civil rights activism in the area.

== Tour stops ==
The first seven markers are within walking distance of each other. The remaining eleven markers require a vehicle to visit within a reasonable amount of time. All Locations are in Meridian, Mississippi.

Number	Marker name	Location	Notes
1	African-American Business District	Intersection of 25th Avenue & 5th Street	
2	The Movement	Intersection of 25th Avenue & 5th Street	
3	Sit-Ins, Pickets & Boycotts	2211 5th Street	
4	The Jewish Contribution	2200 5th Street	
5	Federal Courthouse	2100 9th Street	
6	Voter Registration	500 Constitution Avenue	
7	Freedom Riders	212 Constitution Avenue	
8	McLemore Cemetery	Intersection of 6th Street & 16th Avenue	
9	Newell Chapel	1400 13th Avenue	
10	St. Joseph Catholic Church	1914 18th Avenue	
11	St. John Baptist Church	2000 18th Avenue	
12	The Impact of Churches	Intersection of 13th Street & 27th Avenue	Between St. Paul United Methodist and New Hope Missionary Baptist Church
13	Wechsler School	1415 30th Avenue	The first brink public school for blacks in Mississippi that was publicly funded.
14	Freedom School	Intersection of 16th Street & Martin Luther King Memorial Drive/31st Avenue	
15	Council of Organizations	814 45th Avenue	
16	Old Mt. Olive Missionary Baptist Church	829 47th Avenue	
17	First Union Missionary Baptist Church	610 38th Avenue	
18	James Chaney gravesite	5052 Fish Lodge Road	

== See also ==
- United States Civil Rights Trail
