= Elijah Parish Lovejoy Award (ICWNE) =

Journalism award for newspaper editors

- Awarded for: A member of the newspaper profession who has contributed to the country's journalistic achievement.
- Country: USA
- Presented by: Southern Illinois University
- First award: 1956
- Website: Official website

The Elijah Parish Lovejoy Prize for Courage in Journalism was an award presented annually by the International Conference of Weekly Newspaper Editors (ICWNE) and Southern Illinois University. The award was presented to weekly newspaper editors. Named after Elijah Parish Lovejoy, the award was established in 1956.

== Purpose ==
"The recipient of this award will be a weekly newspaper editor in the United States (later changed to include Canadians) selected for outstanding editorial service, involving the courageous performance of duty in the face of economic, political and social pressure brought against him by members of his community. The purpose of the award is threefold: to honor and preserve the memory of Elijah Parish Lovejoy; to stimulate and honor the kind of achievement embodied in Lovejoy’s own courageous actions, and to promote a sense of mutual responsibility and cooperation between a journalistic world devoted to freedom of the press and a liberal arts college devoted to academic freedom. Because weekly newspaper work does not lead to specialization, it is assumed that one worthy of the award may well have employed several forms of expression. Thus it is the combined effect of editorial comment and reports in the news columns, plus the controversy that will serve as the basis for making the award."

== History ==
The International Society of Weekly Newspaper Editors (or ISWNE) moved from Southern Illinois to Northern Illinois in 1975. The University of Southern Illinois notified ISWNE that the Lovejoy Award was the property of the university, rather than the organization. Thereafter, the award was not issued, although the award for journalists is still issued by Colby College.

== Recipients ==
Year	Name	Source
1956	Mabel Norris Reese	
1957	Horace V. Wells	
1958	J, Willcox Dunn	
1960	Hazel Brannon Smith	
1961	Samuel E. Woodring	
1963	Penn Jones Jr.	
