= Houston, Florida =

- Unincorporated community
- Location within Florida Location within the United States
- Coordinates: 30°15′25″N 82°54′09″W
- Country: United States
- State: Florida
- County: Suwannee
- Elevation: 171 ft (52 m)
- Time zone: UTC-5 (Eastern (EST))
  - Summer (DST): UTC-4 (EDT)
- ZIP code: 32060
- Area code: 386
- GNIS feature ID: 295361

Houston is an unincorporated community in Suwannee County, Florida, United States. Houston is located on U.S. Route 90, 6 miles (9.7 km) east of Live Oak and 18 miles (29 km) west of Lake City. Houston is the location of Camp Weed & the Cerveny Conference Center and the Suwannee Country Club

Civil Rights leader Harry T. Moore was born in Houston. Houston was the County seat of Suwannee County from 1858 until 1867, when the county seat was moved to Live Oak.
