= Murders of Harry and Harriette Moore =

1951 murders of activists in Mims, Florida

- Part of the Civil Rights Movement and racism against African Americans
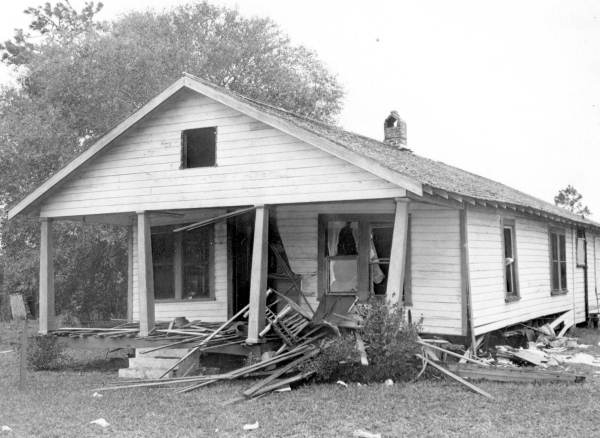
- The home of the Moores after the Christmas Day bombing
- Location: Mims, Florida
- Date: December 25, 1951; Evening hours (EST)
- Target: Harry and Harriette Moore
- Attack type: Double-murder by bombing
- Weapon: Dynamite
- Victims: Harry T. Moore (died on the day of the bombing); Harriette V. Moore (died on January 3, 1952)
- Assailants: Joseph N. Cox (suspected; committed suicide in 1952); Earl J. Brooklyn (suspected; died in 1952); Tillman H. Belvin (suspected; died in 1952); Edward L. Spivey (suspected; died in 1980)
- Motive: Retribution against Harry Moore for his civil rights activities
- Charges: None
- Convictions: None
- Litigation: 5 investigations

Harry T. Moore and his wife, Harriette V. S. Moore, were pioneer activists and leaders of the early Civil Rights Movement in the United States and became the first martyrs of the movement. On the night of Christmas, December 25, 1951, a bomb that had been planted under the bedroom floor of the Moores' home in Mims, Florida, exploded. They had celebrated their 25th wedding anniversary earlier that day. Harry died in the ambulance in transit from the attack, and Harriette died from her injuries nine days later, on January 3, 1952. Their deaths were the first assassination of any activist to occur during the Civil Rights Movement and the only time that a husband and wife were killed during the history of the movement.

== Background ==
Harry Moore and Harriette Simms married on December 25, 1926, and moved into the Simms' family home the following fall. Harry was an educator, and Harriette was a former teacher turned insurance broker. In 1927, Harry was promoted to the position of principal at the local Titusville Colored School. The city's school system was racially segregated, like many others in the country at the time. Harry taught the school's ninth grade (the school taught grades one to nine), and he also supervised the team of teachers at the school. The school was closed early his first year by the local school board just six months into the year, as part of the local school system's systemic discrimination against black children. The Moores had their first daughter in 1928 and moved into their own home with an acre of land given to them by Harriette's parents. They gave birth to their second daughter in 1930. Harriette returned to her career in education the following year and later began working as a teacher for the same school as Harry.

In 1934, Harry founded the Brevard County, Florida, National Association for the Advancement of Colored People (NAACP) chapter. He later served as the NAACP's first Executive Secretary in the state of Florida. The NAACP chapter worked towards achieving equal pay for equal work for teachers of any race, fought to get lynchings prosecuted, and attempted to register black voters in the region.

Moore's activism was highly controversial in the local white-dominated county. In 1946, it resulted in the firings of Harry and Harriette from their teaching jobs by state authorities. Harry then became a full-time employee of the NAACP.

== Murder ==
On the night of December 25, 1951, the Moores finished celebrating Christmas and their 25th wedding anniversary. When they later retired to their bedroom for the evening, a bomb exploded, injuring Harry and Harriette but leaving their daughter (who was at home at the time, the other being in a different location) unharmed. The improvised explosive device, which was made from dynamite, had been placed directly under the Moores' bedroom floor. The Moores were rushed to the nearest hospital that would treat African-Americans in Sanford, Florida, a 29.8 miles (48.0 km) drive by car. Harry died while being transported; his wife, Harriette, lived to see her husband buried before she died nine days later from her injuries.

== Investigations and motive ==
Over the years, a number of motives have been suggested for the Moores' deaths. All of them share a common theme — retribution against Harry Moore for his civil rights activities. — Charlie Crist, 35th Attorney General of the State of Florida

Since the night of the explosion in 1951, five separate criminal investigations have been initiated and completed. The first investigation was headed by the FBI, began on the night of the explosion, and concluded in 1955. The second investigation was a joint investigation by the Brevard County Sheriff's Office and Brevard County State Attorney's Office in 1978. The third investigation took place in 1991 by the Florida Department of Law Enforcement (FDLE). In 2004, a fourth investigation was commenced by the Florida Attorney General's Office of Civil Rights. In 2008, the FBI again investigated the Moore homicides as part of the Department of Justice's "Cold Case Initiative".

In total, the five criminal investigations revealed evidence implicating four subjects in the bombing. The four subjects were known to be high-ranking members within the Ku Klux Klan in the central region of Florida. The first of the four, Earl J. Brooklyn, was a Klansman with a reputation for being exceedingly violent and described as "a renegade" after being expelled from a Klavern of the Ku Klux Klan in Georgia for engaging in unsanctioned acts of violence. Brooklyn reportedly was in possession of floor plans of the Moore home and was said to be recruiting volunteers to assist in the bombing. The second subject, Tillman H. "Curley" Belvin, was also reported to be a violent member of the Klan and a close friend of Brooklyn. Joseph N. Cox, another Klansman, was implicated in the bombing by a fourth co-conspirator, Edward L. Spivey.

Spivey implicated Cox in a deathbed confession while he suffered in the late stages of cancer in 1978. He told the police that Cox had gone to his home and privately confessed that he had been paid $5,000 by the Klan to kill the Moores. After confessing, Cox borrowed a shotgun and committed suicide. Cox, 61, committed suicide on March 30, 1952, one day after he was confronted by the FBI. Both Brooklyn and Belvin died during the FBI's initial investigation—Belvin, 58, of natural causes on August 25, 1952, and Brooklyn, 41, of an illness on Christmas Day 1952, one year to the day after the bombing. With three of the suspects dead within a year of the bombing and Spivey's death from cancer in 1980, no arrests were ever made in the case.

The investigation revealed that Harry's civil rights advocacy made him a known target of the Klan. The Department of Justice Civil Rights Division closed the file on the federal investigation in 2011.

== Public reaction ==
During the early morning hours of the following day, December 26, 1951, angry men in Titusville's black neighborhoods were in the streets spreading word of the bombing. In the following hours men and women from Brevard County, still in their nightclothes, walked and rode towards Mims to protest in the streets. Most of the people knew Moore personally, some via his job in education, others via the NAACP, and still others through his registration drives.

The assassination triggered nationwide protests, with rallies, memorials, and other events held following the news of the bombing. President Harry S Truman and Governor Fuller Warren both received a high volume of telegrams and letters in protest of the murder of the civil rights activists in Mims, Florida. In New York City, a few weeks later on January 5, 1952, Jackie Robinson held a memorial service drawing approximately 3,000 mourners. The NAACP held a memorial service, in March 1952 in the Madison Square Garden that was attended by 15,000 people, and speakers like Langston Hughes had come to give their respects.

And this he says, our Harry Moore
As from the grave he cries
No bomb can kill the dreams I hold
For freedom never dies!"

— Langston Hughes, (1951)

== Awards and tributes ==
In 1952, the year following the Moore's deaths, Harry was posthumously awarded the NAACP's Spingarn Medal. In 1999, the site of the Moore's home in Mims, Florida, where the bombing occurred became an Historical Heritage Landmark of the State of Florida. Five years later, Brevard County's local government christened the "Harry T. and Harriette Moore Memorial Park and Interpretive Center."

== See also ==
- Civil Rights Memorial
- Crime in Florida
- List of unsolved murders (1900–1979)
- Moore Memorial Park and Cultural Center

== Sources ==
- Green, Ben (1999). Before His Time: The Untold Story of Harry T. Moore, America's First Civil Rights Martyr. Simon and Schuster. ISBN 9780684854533.
- Newton, Michael (2014). Famous Assassinations in World History: An Encyclopedia [2 volumes]. ABC-CLIO. ISBN 9781610692861.
