= Margarita Romo =

American farm activist (born 1936)

- Born: Margarita Romo
- Other names: Margaret Romo; Margaret Bearden; Margaret Edwards; Margaret Simmons

Margarita Romo is an activist for immigrant farmworkers in Florida. She was inducted into the Florida Civil Rights Hall of Fame in 2013.

== Biography ==
Romo was born in Texas on October 18, 1936. Her parents were both farmworkers, and Romo was one of eight children in the family. When Romo was three, her mother died from cancer, and Romo was placed into an orphanage with three of her siblings. She left school by the time she reached 9th grade, and began teaching at convent. She moved to Tampa, Florida in 1969. Romo is bilingual, and started translating for men working in the migrant camps. While attending Pasco-Hernando Community College, she started a food pantry for single mothers. In the 1980s she learned how to prepare immigration papers for people who wanted to start the process of becoming a citizen of the United States.

Romo founded Farmworkers Self-Help Inc. after watching a child die who she felt should not have died. The organization was incorporated in 1982. She serves as its executive director, and in that role she helps with immigration, employment, and healthcare. Her work primarily centers on a neighborhood known as Tommytown, where she advocates for the firsts of farmworkers in the area.

== Award and honours ==
In 2005 she received a "Christian Hero" award to help fund the work she was doing in assisting the families of Mexican migrant workers. In 2010, She was named Hispanic Woman of the year by the Tampa Hispanic Heritage. In 2013 she was inducted into the Florida Civil Rights Hall of Fame.

== Personal life ==
Romo married Ralph Bearden when she was 18 years old, and they had three children before getting divorced. In 1961 she married Bruce Edwards, and they had three children before divorcing him in 1979. In the 1980s she was married to John Simons for a few years. Following her divorce from Simons she legally changed her name back to Margarita Romo.
