= Earl M. Johnson =

Lawyer and civil rights activist

Earl M. Johnson Sr.
- Born: 1928
- Died: 1988 (aged 59–60)
- Occupation: Lawyer

Earl M. Johnson Sr. (1928–1988) was a lawyer and civil rights advocate in Florida.

== Career ==
Johnson was a graduate of Howard University and was the first African American to be a member of the Jacksonville Bar Association.

Johnson is known for being a prominent advocate for the consolidation of the City of Jacksonville and Duval County, and is credited with mobilizing African-American support for the 1967 referendum.

After the consolidation vote, Jackson became the first Black person to be elected to an at-large seat on the Jacksonville City Council.

Johnson represented numerous civil rights activists during his tenure, including Martin Luther King, Jr. and former Mayor of Atlanta Andrew Young. For this, and his broader work to desegregate public places in Florida, he was inducted into the Florida Civil Rights Hall of Fame in 2016 by Governor Rick Scott.

Johnson died of cancer in 1988.

== Legacy ==
Earl Johnson Memorial Park in Jacksonville is named for him.

== Personal life ==
Johnson married his wife Janet in 1952, when he also became a Catholic to join her in the Church.

Their son, Earl M. Johnson Jr., is also a lawyer and civil rights activist.
