= Melanie L. Campbell =

American civil rights activist (fl. 21st century)

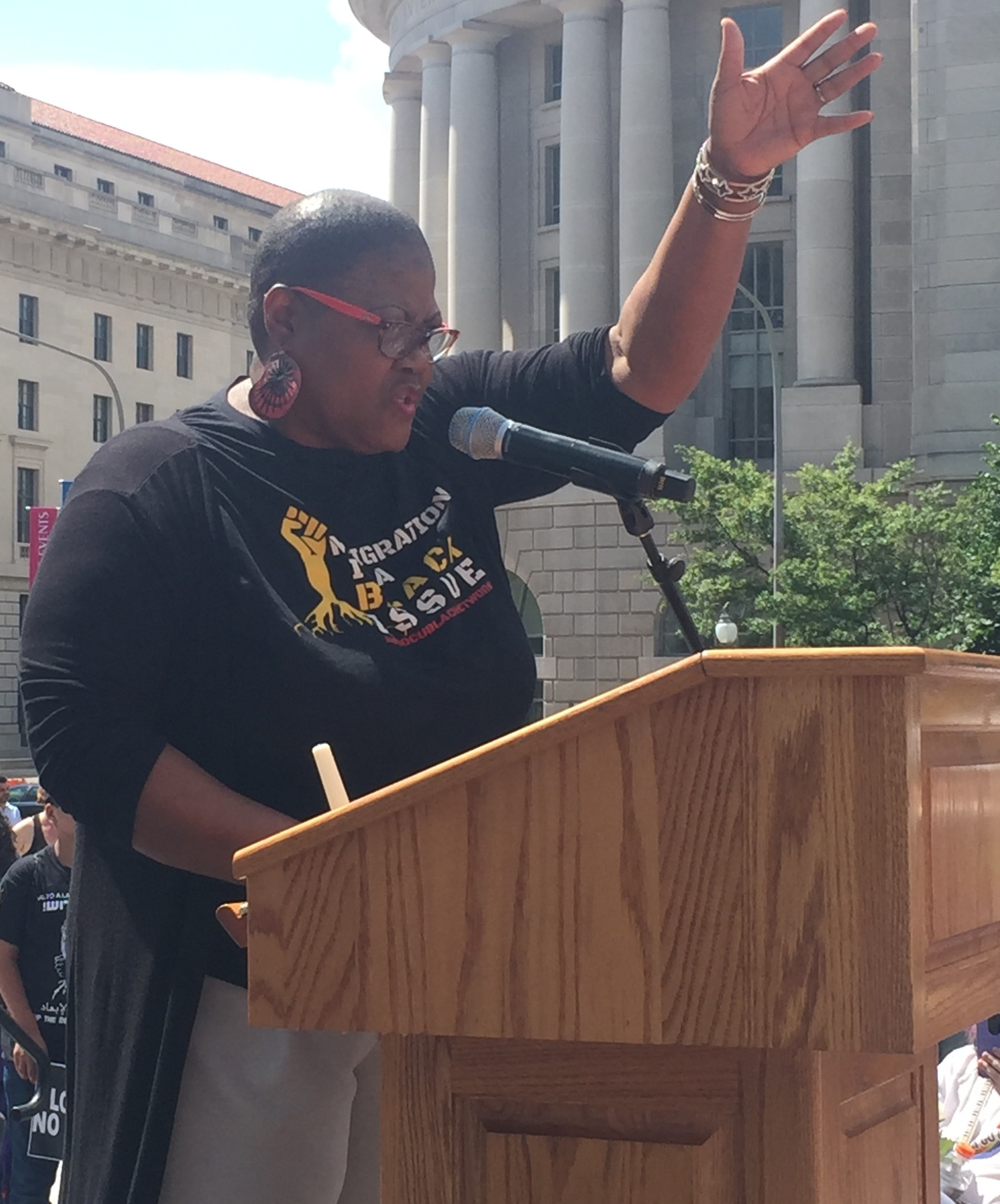
- Campbell in 2018
- Born: Mims, Florida, U.S.
- Education: Clark Atlanta University (BA)
- Occupations: CEO, president, civil rights activist

Melanie L. Campbell is an American activist and the president and CEO of the National Coalition on Black Civic Participation, a national civil rights nonprofit organization. She is best known for her voting-rights activism.

== Early life and education ==
Campbell was born in Titusville, Florida. Her mother taught in Brevard County Public Schools in the 1970s, and Campbell credits her as being instrumental in teaching Black history in Florida classrooms. Campbell recounts one of her childhood memories from the 1960s as hiding on the floor while her father stood guard outside, fearing a visit from the Ku Klux Klan, which was still active in Florida at the time.

She earned her Bachelor of Arts in business administration from Clark Atlanta University in 1983. While in attendance, she served as a student organizer for the NAACP.

== Career ==
Upon graduating, Campbell started in a corporate job but soon returned to a civic role, working for Maynard Jackson, the then-mayor of Atlanta, Georgia. Campbell was responsible for hiring Stacey Abrams into the office of youth services.

In 1995, Campbell relocated to Washington, D.C. to work for the National Coalition on Black Civic Participation (NCBCP). During this time, Campbell was mentored by civil rights activist Dorothy I. Height. Campbell cites Height for the emphasis she placed on universal respect across generations: "She knew youth are our future, but never missed an opportunity to salute the Sheroes on whose shoulders she stood". Campbell became the executive director of the NCBCP in 2000 and went on to become president and CEO in 2011.

The fight for inclusion never ends. It can be burdensome, but we have to keep doing it. If we lose this battle, we lose our fight to build power and for self-determination.

— Melanie Campbell

In 2004, Campbell led a voter outreach campaign for the NCBCP, working with both the NAACP and the National Urban League in a push to get more African-American voters to the polls. Campbell's efforts are credited with registering 200,000 voters in the 2004, 2008, and 2012 national elections.

In the summer of 2021, both the NCBCP and the National Council of Negro Women staged protests against ongoing proposed voter restrictions, where Campbell was arrested during an act of civil disobedience by Capitol Police during the protests. Campbell was arrested again at a protest calling for passage of the For the People Act.

Campbell joined other Black leaders to push President Joe Biden to select Kamala Harris, a Black woman, as his running mate in 2020. Campbell was involved in the effort to restore voting rights to convicted felons in Florida. She also runs the Black Women's Roundtable, an organization that uses civic engagement to better empower Black women to tackle social issues within their communities.

Campbell spoke at the first night of the 2024 Democratic National Convention, introducing the Rev. Jesse Jackson.

== Awards and honors ==
- In 2000, Campbell was recognized as one of the Top Forty Under Forty Emerging Leaders in Washington, D.C.
- In 2010, Campbell received the National Urban League's Women of Power Award for her "impact on voter engagement and reform, her leadership after hurricane Katrina, and her ability to bring together powerful women"
- In 2017, Campbell was featured in Essence Magazine's "100 Woke Women"
- In 2021, Campbell was inducted into National Black College Alumni Hall of Fame for her work on civil rights
