= Truman Futch =

American politician

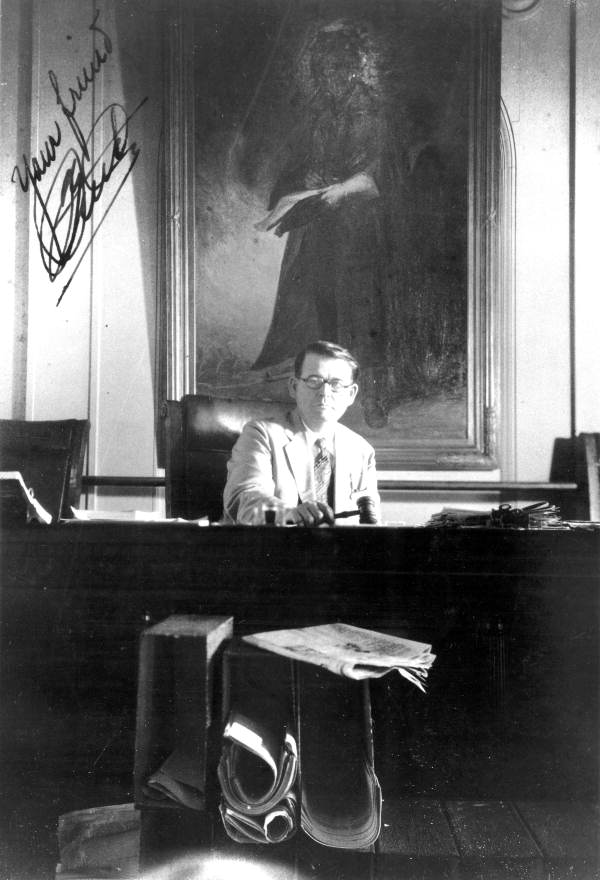

Personal details
- Born: October 1, 1891 Hampton, Florida
- Died: March 24, 1960 (aged 68)

Truman G. Futch Jr. (October 1, 1891 – March 24, 1960) was an American state senator and judge in Florida. He served as president of the state senate. He also served three terms in the Florida House of Representatives. As a Lake County, Florida judge he was involved in the trials of the Groveland Four. He denied an attempt to prosecute sheriff Willis McCall who shot two of them during an alleged escape attempt while the sheriff was transporting them. He was also involved in a school segregation case. He once issued a subpoena to Florida governor LeRoy Collins. Futch died on March 24, 1960.

He declared Jesse Delbert Daniels insane and the 19 year-old was committed to a mental institution until he was freed 14 years later.

Futch was born in Hampton, Florida.

Futch liked to whittle.
