= Murder of Michelle Schofield =

Murder

Michelle Schofield
- Born: Michelle Saum; December 8, 1968
- Died: February 1987 (aged 18)
- Cause of death: Stab wounds
- Body discovered: Lakeland, Florida, U.S.

Leo Schofield
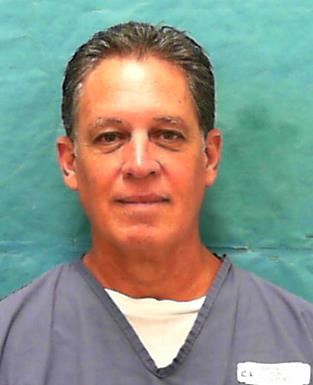
- Schofield mugshot
- Born: December 9, 1965 (age 60)
- Status: Paroled (2024)
- Convictions: 25 years to life
- Penalty: Murder

Michelle Saum Schofield (born December 8, 1968) was an American woman who lived in Central Florida with her husband Leo Schofield. She did not return home from her job at a restaurant in Lakeland on February 24, 1987. Her body was found three days later in a canal in Bone Valley. She had been stabbed multiple times. Leo was convicted of her murder in 1988 and was in prison for thirty-six years; however, he has always maintained his innocence.

A podcast about the murder called Bone Valley, created by writer Gilbert King for Lava for Good, was released in late 2022. The case was also featured on an episode of ABC's 20/20 called Last seen in Lakeland that aired on September 23, 2022.

Leo Schofield was denied parole in May 2023, with another review scheduled for March 2024. At the 2024 parole hearing, Leo Schofield was granted parole and released on April 30.
