= Florida African American Heritage Preservation Network =

The Florida African American Heritage Preservation Network (FAAHPN) is a professional association organized in 2001 by the John Gilmore Riley Center Museum.

FAAHPN serves as an informational and technical assistance resource in response to a growing interest in preserving Florida’s African American culture, that of the African diaspora, and that of other related ethnically diverse historic resources globally.

The Florida Black Heritage Trail Guide is a publication produced by FAAHPN that details a microcosm of African-American landmarks and legacies that exist in various locations throughout Florida.
