= Rutledge Pearson =

American activist and baseball player

- Pearson on cover of Jet magazine, 1964
- First baseman
- Born: September 9, 1929
- Died: May, 1967

Teams
- New York Black Yankees (1952); Birmingham Black Barons

Rutledge Henry Pearson (September 9, 1929–May 1967) was an educator, civil rights leader and human rights activist. He also was a Negro league baseball player in his early years.

== Early life ==
He was the youngest son of Mr. and Mrs. Lloyd H. Pearson Sr and graduated from New Stanton High School in 1947. He attended Tillatson College in Austin, Texas on a baseball scholarship and graduated with a Bachelor of Arts in Sociology in 1951. He and his future wife, Mary Ann Johnson, were classmates with Medgar Evers at Tillatson.

== Baseball ==
The Reading Eagle newspaper reports on the 27th July 1952 that Pearson played for the 1952 New York Black Yankees of the Negro National League. He was 6'3 and played first base. He played professional baseball for the Birmingham Black Barons of the Negro American League. He taught history at Isaiah Blocker Junior High School and coached baseball at New Stanton High School as well.

== Civil rights ==
In 1961, he was elected President of the Jacksonville Branch of the NAACP. He was later elected President of the Florida State Conference of the NAACP. As a president, he supported the civil rights efforts in nearby St. Augustine that led to the passage of the landmark Civil Rights Act of 1964.

He was featured on the cover of JET magazine on April 20, 1964, with the headline "Former Baseball Star Leads Jacksonville Civil Rights Struggle." The article states that he was very influential in recruiting members of the NAACP; citing that in just two years he was able to drive membership from a few hundred to over 2,000. He was also noted for his ability to influence the youth of Jacksonville enough to calm some of the violence surrounding the civil rights clashes that took place in the city in the 1960s.

In May 1967, he was killed in a car accident on the way to organize Laundry workers in Memphis, Tennessee. A school, a post office and a park in Jacksonville, Florida, are named in his honor.
