= Lake County Sheriff's Office (Florida) =

County law enforcement agency for Lake County, Florida

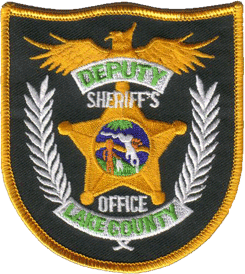

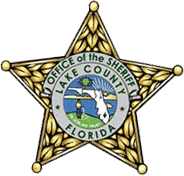
- Abbreviation: LCSO

Agency overview
- Annual budget: $61,799,661 (2008)

Jurisdictional structure
- Operations jurisdiction: Lake, Florida, United States
- Area: 1,156 sq mi (2,990 km^{2}).
- Population: 325,875 (2015)
- General nature: Local civilian police

Operational structure
- Headquarters: Tavares, Florida, U.S.
- Sworn members: 514
- Unsworn members: 260
- Agency executive: Peyton C. Grinnell, Sheriff

Facilities
- Substations: 3
- Jails: 1
- Helicopters: 3 Ex-Army OH-58As

Website
- http://www.lcso.org

The Lake County Sheriff's Office is the largest law enforcement agency in Lake County, Florida, United States. Per the State of Florida Constitution, the sheriff is the chief law enforcement officer of both the incorporated and unincorporated areas of the county. The current Sheriff is U.S. Marine Corps veteran Peyton C. Grinnell who was elected November, 2016 in the Lake County general election. He succeeds Sheriff Gary Borders (d. Nov. 2021), who was appointed by Governor Jeb Bush following the death of Sheriff Chris Daniels in 2006, and was subsequently elected in 2008, and 2012. The agency has been awarded with a certificate of accreditation from the Commission for Florida Law Enforcement Accreditation, consequently, both the Law Enforcement and Corrections divisions of the Lake County Sheriff's Office are now accredited.

== Divisions ==
Law Enforcement Operations

- Uniform Patrol Bureau (Road Patrol, Traffic Enforcement, Street Crimes Unit, Report Writers)
- Criminal Investigations Bureau (Property Crimes, Missing Persons, Economic Crimes, Violent Crimes, Special Victims Unit, Crime Scene Investigations, Evidence, Fingerprints)
- Special Investigations Bureau (Intelligence Unit, Sexual Offender Tracking Unit, Narcotics Unit, Homeland Security Unit, Cyber Crimes Unit, Felony Registration)

Criminal Justice Operations

- Court Services Bureau (Court Deputies, Bailiff Unit, Building Security)
- Detention Security Bureau (Detention Deputies, Building Security)
- Support Services Bureau (Booking, Classification, Fugitive Extradition, Transportation)

Administrative Services

- Emergency Management Bureau (Ag/Marine, Animal Enforcement Officers, Aviation, Emergency Management)
- Special Services Bureau (9-1-1 Communications, Information Technology, School Resource Deputies, Radio/Electronics Shop, Juvenile Court Liaison, Criminal Justice Academy, Explorer Post 60, School Crossing Guards, Citizens On Patrol, Community Services)
- Support Services Bureau (Civil Deputies, Property Section, Warrants, Fleet Maintenance, Records)

== Specialty units ==
Like many law enforcement agencies, the Lake County Sheriff's Office also has deputies with specialized training. These deputies perform their normal full-time jobs (road patrol, detectives, detention deputy, etc.) and perform one the specialty units as the needs call for. Some of the specialty units are:

- Aviation Unit
- Dive Team (Underwater Search and Recovery)
- HDT (Hazardous Devices Team)
- Honor Guard
- Hostage Negotiations Team
- K9 Unit
- Marine Unit
- Mounted Patrol and Posse
- SWAT
- Street Crimes Unit
- Traffic Enforcement Unit (Motors Unit)

== Previous Sheriffs (1887-2016) ==
Name	Date
Gary S. Borders	2006-2016
Chris Daniels Sr.	2005-2006
Fred A.M. Cobb	2004
J.M. "Buddy" Phillips	2004
George E. Knupp Jr.	1989-2004
Noel E. Griffin Jr.	1981-1988
Malcom McCall	1977-1980
Guy C. Bliss	1973-1976
Frank Meech	1972
Willis V. McCall	1945-1972
Emil Yde	1944-1945
B.A. Cassidy*	1937-1944
W.B. Gibson	1933-1936
B.A Cassidy*	1921-1933
T.C. "Thad" Smyth	1913-1920
Henry E. Murhee	1909-1913
Jesse W. Hunter	1908
Henry E. Murhee	1905-1908
J.W. Northrup	1897-1905
John P. Galloway*	1887-1897

- Sheriff B.A. Cassidy also served as interim Sheriff from 1908-1909
- Sheriff John P. Galloway also Served as Sheriff of Sumter County, Florida and later Marion County, Florida

== Misconduct ==
In January 2011, Lieutenant C.J. Thompson bought a laptop computer with a department credit card. He then repaid the amount due from investigative funds. He resigned when he was caught.

In July 2012, unnamed deputies were seeking a man suspected of murder. They went to the wrong apartment door at night and were met by an armed occupant who came out armed and was shot and killed. Drugs and Paraphernalia were found in the apartment. The deputies said they had not announced themselves as police as required by procedures.

In January 2014, Deputy Matthew Donnelly was arrested for the sexual battery of a woman after placing her boyfriend in handcuffs in the back of his police car. A police spokesman said DNA evidence pointed to Donnelly. The officer was fired shortly after his arrest., Donnelly was sentenced to 12 years in state prison.

== See also ==
- List of law enforcement agencies in Florida
- List of U.S. state and local law enforcement agencies
- County sheriff (Florida)
- Willis V. McCall Sheriff of Lake County 1944-1972
