= Willis V. McCall =

American segregationist lawman (1909–1994)

- Photo of Willis McCall taken in 1951, 15 minutes after he claimed to have been attacked by Sam Shepherd and Walter Irvin

10th Sheriff of Lake County, Florida
- In office 1944–1972

Personal details
- Born: Willis Virgil McCall; July 21, 1909 Umatilla, Florida, U.S.
- Died: April 28, 1994 (aged 84) Eustis, Florida, U.S.
- Party: Democratic
- Occupation: Sheriff

Willis Virgil McCall (July 21, 1909 – April 28, 1994) was sheriff of Lake County, Florida. He was elected for seven consecutive terms from 1944 to 1972. He gained national attention in the Groveland Case in 1949. In 1951, he shot two defendants in the case while he was transporting them to a new trial and killed one on the spot. Claiming self-defense, he was not indicted for this action. He also enforced anti-miscegenation laws and was a white supremacist and segregationist.

He lost his bid for an eighth term shortly after he had been acquitted of the murder in 1972 of Tommy J. Vickers, a mentally-disabled black prisoner who died in his custody. McCall's notoriety outlived him. In 2007, the Lake County Commission voted unanimously to change a road named in his honor 20 years before because of his history as a "bully lawman whose notorious tenure was marked by charges of racial intolerance, brutality and murder." During his 28-year tenure as sheriff, McCall was investigated multiple times for civil rights violations and inmate abuse and was tried for murder but was never convicted.

== Early life ==
Willis McCall was born in Umatilla, Lake County, Florida, and was the son of a dirt farmer from Alabama (born c. 1877) and a woman named Pearl (born c. 1886).

== Career ==
McCall was first elected as sheriff of Lake County in 1944 after defeating Emil Yde in the Democratic Party primary. He was successively re-elected until 1972. "At 6 feet 1 and weighing more than 200 pounds, McCall loomed large as Lake sheriff from 1945 until 1972. He wore a white felt hat, black string tie, and polished boots." In 1972, Guy Bliss defeated McCall in the election for sheriff.

=== Groveland Four ===
On July 16, 1949, Norma Padgett, a 17-year-old married white woman in Groveland, Florida, said that she had been raped by four young black men. The next day, 16-year-old Charles Greenlee, Sam Shepherd, 22; and Walter Irvin, 22, were arrested and jailed pending trial. Shepherd and Irvin were both US Army veterans. Sheriff McCall was out of state at the time but returned the next day. The case attracted national attention, and McCall was frequently in the limelight.

Ernest Thomas fled the county and avoided arrest, but a sheriff's posse shot and killed him about 200 miles northwest of Lake County in Madison County. A coroner's inquest was unable to determine who had killed Thomas, as he was shot some 400 times.

As word spread about the alleged rape, an angry crowd of whites gathered at the county jail in Tavares and demanded that McCall turn the suspects over to them for lynching. He had hidden Shepherd and Irvin in the basement of his Eustis, Florida, home and transferred them to Raiford State Prison for their safety.

The mob headed toward Groveland, where two of the suspects and their families lived. Unrest continued, and on the third day, McCall and several prominent businessmen warned the black residents to leave town until things settled, which most did. McCall called the Florida Governor asking for National Guard troops to be sent to Lake County; when the troops arrived in Groveland, the mob had already burned several buildings to the ground, including the family home of Sam Shepherd.

A grand jury indicted the three rape suspects. Shepherd and Greenlee later told FBI investigators that deputies beat them until they confessed to the crime. US Attorney Herbert Phillips failed to return indictments against Lake County Sheriff's Deputies James Yates and Leroy Campbell for their roles.

Reviews of the trial have shown it filled with flaws. McCall had told the press before the trial that two men had confessed, which was reported and highlighted by a drawing on the front page. The all-white jury quickly convicted each of the three men. The judge sentenced Shepherd and Irvin to death. Because Greenlee was 16 and still a minor, he was sentenced to life in prison. In 1951, the US Supreme Court overturned Lake County's conviction of Shepherd and Irvin on the grounds that blacks had been improperly excluded from the jury. (Most blacks were still disenfranchised by the state constitution and discriminatory practices in the segregated Jim Crow state; because they could not vote, they were not eligible to sit on juries.)

In November 1951, McCall was transporting Shepherd and Irvin from Raiford to Tavares for the retrial. He pulled off to a country road and claimed tire trouble. He swore in a deposition that Shepherd and Irvin attacked him in an escape attempt and that he shot them both in self-defense while backing away. The prisoners were handcuffed together during the entire incident. Shepherd was killed on the spot, and McCall shot Irvin three times, but he survived. During the incident, Deputy James Yates also arrived and, according to Irvin, stood over him and shot him again while he was wounded.

Ambulances took McCall and Irvin to Waterman Hospital in Eustis. McCall was treated for a concussion and facial injuries and Irvin for his gunshot wounds. At the hospital, Irvin met with NAACP lawyers, and later told the press that McCall shot him and Shepherd without provocation, as did Yates. In the early 21st century, Gilbert King reported he examined the unredacted FBI files from the case. He wrote in his book published in 2012 that the FBI had located a bullet in the soil directly below the blood stain where Irvin had lain wounded, supporting Irvin's claim that Yates fired at him while standing over him.

When a Lake County coroner's inquest concluded that McCall had acted in the line of duty, Judge Truman Futch ruled that he saw no need to impanel a grand jury on this incident. After Irvin recovered from the shooting, his retrial was moved to Marion County, just north of Lake County, and began in February 1952. He was offered a plea bargain, but Irvin refused to plead guilty and maintained his innocence. The jury found Irvin guilty, and the judge sentenced him to death again. The case was appealed, but the conviction was upheld by the Florida Supreme Court. In early 1954, the US Supreme Court declined to hear the case.

Supporters of Irvin appealed to the governor for clemency. After reviewing the material personally, newly elected governor LeRoy Collins in 1955 commuted Irvin's sentence to life in prison, saying that he did not believe that the state established guilt beyond a reasonable doubt. Greenlee, who did not appeal his case, was paroled in 1962 and Irvin was in 1968. Irvin died in 1969 while visiting Lake County. Greenlee moved with his wife and daughter to Tennessee, where his son was born a few years later. Greenlee lived until 2012.

=== 1951 Harry T. Moore bombing ===
Harry T. Moore, executive director of the Florida NAACP, challenged segregation and law enforcement. In the 1940s and the early 1950s, he succeeded in gaining voter registration of tens of thousands of blacks, who had been essentially disfranchised since a new state constitution at the turn of the century. Following the convictions and sentencing in the Groveland case, he requested for the governor to suspend McCall from office and investigate allegations of prisoner abuse. Six weeks after calling for McCall's removal, Moore and his wife were killed when a bomb exploded under their bedroom in Mims in Brevard County on Christmas night in 1952. Rumors alleged that McCall was behind the bombing, but both an extensive FBI investigation at the time and additional later separate FBI and Justice Department investigations have failed to produce any evidence linking McCall in any way.

In 2005, the Florida Department of Law Enforcement began a new investigation of the Moore bombing to include excavation of their home site in a search for new forensic evidence. On August 16, 2006, Florida Attorney General Charlie Crist announced his office had completed its 20-month investigation, which resulted in the naming of four now-dead suspects: Earl Brooklyn, Tillman Belvin, Joseph Cox and Edward Spivey. All four had a long history with the Ku Klux Klan and served as officers in the Orange County Klavern. The investigation reported finding no link between McCall and Moore.

=== Platt children ===
In 1954, McCall was asked by the Lake County school board to uphold their decision to ban five children from a segregated white public school in Mount Dora after parents and teachers had suspected them of being "Negro." (Under a one-drop law in Florida passed in the early 20th century, persons with any known African ancestry were classified as black, regardless of their appearance or proportion of European ancestry.) In 1954, the US Supreme Court ruled in Brown v. Board of Education that segregation of public schools was unconstitutional. The state resisted school integration, like much of the South.

McCall visited the Platts' house and examined the five children. He concluded they were negroes, which disqualified them from the white school. Official birth and marriage records all classified the Platts as white, and they were said to have Indian ancestry as well. McCall addressed a Delaware chapter of the National Association for the Advancement of White People later that year and urged whites to oppose the desegregation of schools.

Because of threats and violence, the Platts did not have their children attend the public school. McCall arranged to have the children enrolled in the Mt. Dora Christian Home and Bible School, a private school that was not subject to segregation laws. On October 18, 1955, a court ruled that the children could attend white public school. By then, the Platt family had decided to move away from Florida.

=== Indictment for death of prisoner Tommy J. Vickers ===
McCall was indicted in 1972 for second-degree murder by a state grand jury for the death of Tommy J. Vickers, a mentally-disabled black prisoner who was in his custody. Vickers died in the hospital in April 1972 of acute peritonitis from a blow to the lower abdomen. McCall was accused of kicking and beating Vickers to death for throwing his food on the floor.

Governor Reubin Askew suspended McCall the day of the indictment. McCall was acquitted by an all-white jury in Ocala in neighboring Marion County after a lengthy trial. The jury concluded its deliberations after 70 minutes. McCall returned to office. Critics argued that the all-white jury never seriously considered the charges. Supporters of the sheriff claimed that the charges made against McCall were fabricated and based on politics. The presiding state judge said that the charges brought against McCall appeared to have been false.

== Later life ==
Days after his trial for the murder of Vickers, McCall narrowly lost his re-election bid in November 1972. Lake County had changed considerably during his time in office, growing in population, with many new people from the North as retirees. McCall was said to have bragged that he had been investigated 49 times and that five different governors had tried to remove him: He liked to say "I've been accused of everything but taking a bath and called everything but a child of God." He retired to his home in Umatilla, Florida.

In 1985, the Lake County Board of County Commissioners named the road by his house, County Road 450A (CR 450A), as Willis V. McCall Road in his honor. More than 20 years later, the South Umatilla Neighborhood Association, a group of black residents on the road, some of whom had lived there for 50 years, asked the Lake County Commission to change the name of the road, as they objected to its honoring a man with such a history. The commission members unanimously voted to change the road's name back to County Road 450A.

Late in life, McCall published a memoir about his experiences, The Wisdom of Willis McCall. He defended his long career as sheriff and responded to public criticism. "McCall never doubted himself, the usefulness of segregation or the morality of the methods he used to enforce law and order."

McCall died on April 28, 1994, at the age of 84.
