= United States Civil Rights Trail =

Heritage trail in the Southern US

The United States Civil Rights Trail is a heritage trail in the Southern United States that provides visitors with stories about the civil rights movement stories at various landmarks. The Civil Rights Trail links historically important Black churches, school museums, civil rights leaders’ residences, courthouses, and other landmarks of the civil rights movement in the 1950s and 1960s and the creation of the U.S. Constitution’s 13th, 14th and 15th amendments.

== History ==
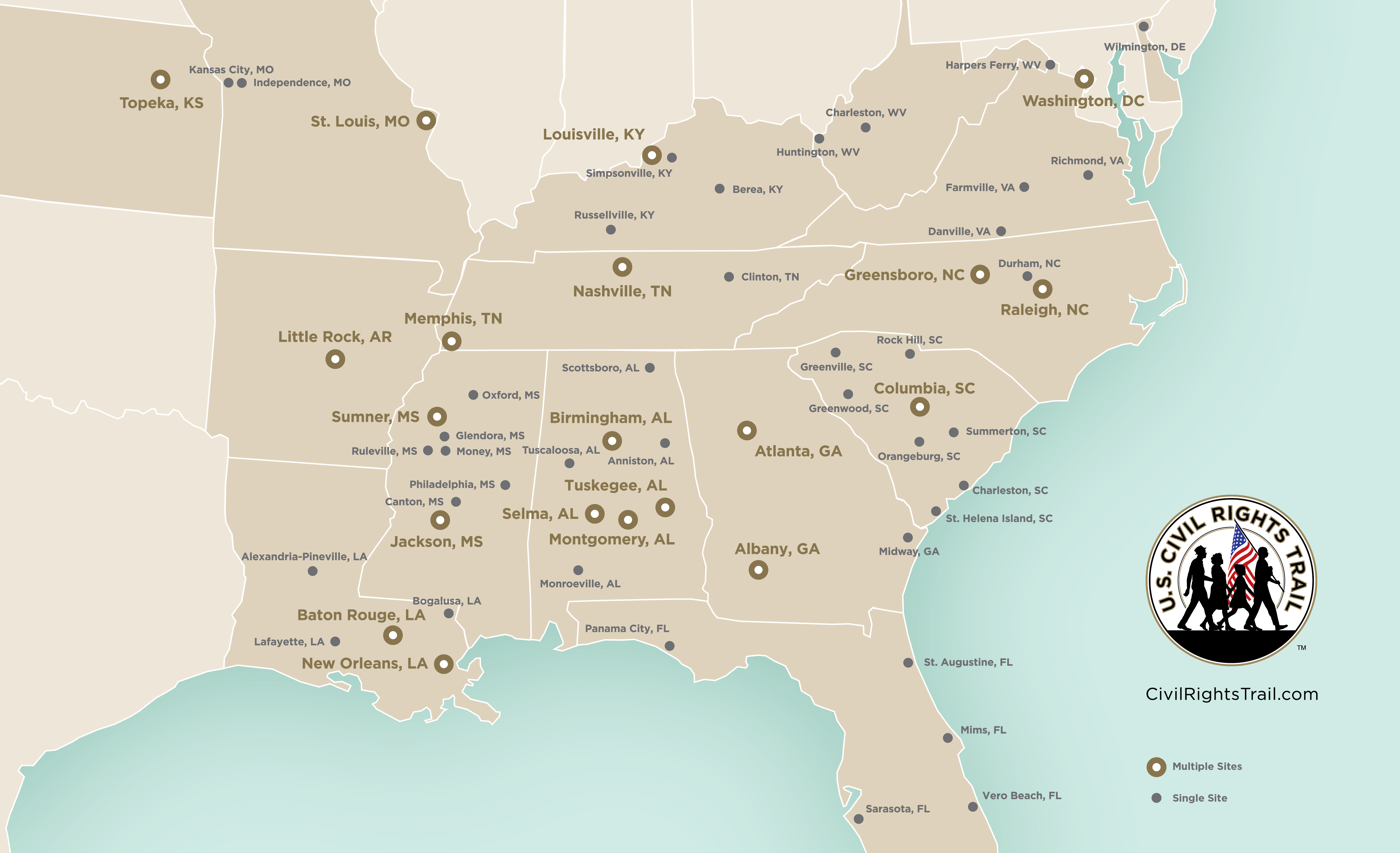
United States Civil Rights Trail Map

Following the Dalai Lama's 2014 tour of the Birmingham Civil Rights District, U.S. President Barack Obama instructed the National Park Service to create more diversity among the nation’s UNESCO World Heritage sites, with particular focus on civil rights. At Alabama’s request in 2016, a Georgia State University team led by Glenn T. Eskew researched and identified 60 civil rights landmarks as potential UNESCO candidates. This initiative evolved into the Alabama Civil Rights Trail.

State tourism departments from Alabama, Arkansas, Georgia, Kentucky, Louisiana, Mississippi, Missouri, North Carolina, South Carolina, Tennessee, Virginia, and West Virginia, collectively known as the Atlanta-based Travel South USA trade association, added more sites and formed a parallel U.S. Civil Rights Trail.

Work on the trail began in 2017 with the web site CivilRightsTrail.com launched on Martin Luther King Jr. Day in 2018.

The Trail includes more than 100 landmark sites in 15 states, several of which are operated by the National Park Service (NPS). In 2017, President Obama conferred NPS designations to establish the Birmingham Civil Rights National Monument; the Freedom Riders National Monument in Anniston, Alabama; and the Reconstruction Era National Historical Park in Beaufort County, South Carolina. In 2017, the home of Medgar Evers and Civil Rights Trail landmark in Jackson, Mississippi was designated the Medgar and Myrlie Evers Home National Monument.

On November 5, 2019, the International Travel & Tourism Awards named the U.S. Civil Rights Trail as Best Regional Destination Campaign its first year of eligibility.

In January 2021, the Smithsonian Institution and The New York Times became the first two national cultural organizations to sponsor escorted tours of the trail, followed by international firms Abercrombie & Kent and Trafalgar Travel.

Also in January 2021, Moon Publishing released Moon U.S. Civil Rights Trail, a travel guide by Deborah D. Douglas. The guide focuses on 16 cities with sites representative of the civil rights movement and includes history lessons and interviews with activists and important figures.

The Official United States Civil Rights Trail Book, by Alabama tourism director Lee Sentell, was published in June 2021 as a companion book to the U.S. Civil Rights Trail.

== See also ==
- Meridian Civil Rights Trail, Mississippi
