= Harry T. Moore =

American teacher and activist (1905–1951)

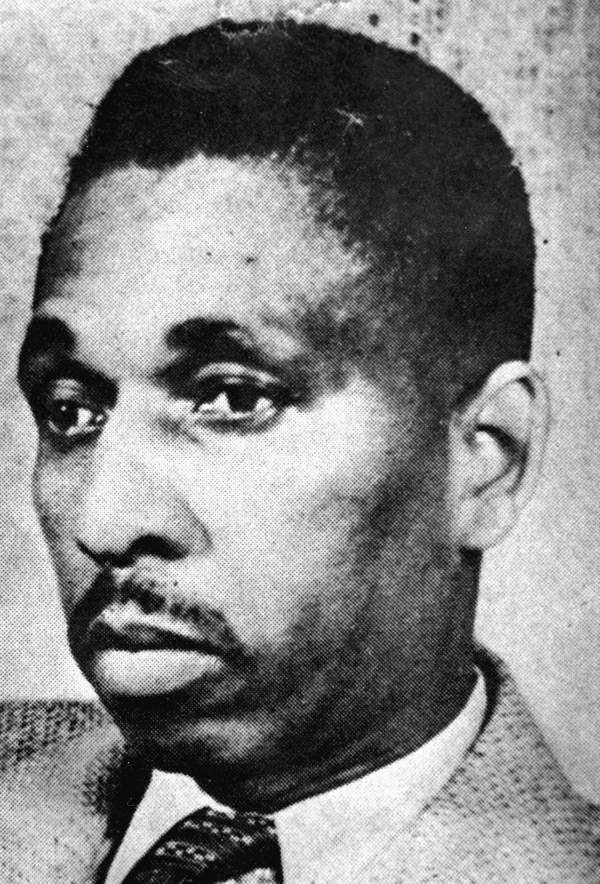
- Undated photo of Moore
- Born: November 18, 1905; Houston, Suwannee County, Florida, U.S.
- Died: December 25, 1951 (aged 46); Mims, Brevard County, Florida, U.S.
- Cause of death: Assassination by bombing
- Occupations: Educator, civil rights pioneer
- Spouse: Harriette Moore (m. 1926)
- Children: 2
- Website: Harry Moore on pbs.org

Harry Tyson Moore (November 18, 1905 – December 25, 1951) was an African-American educator, a pioneer leader of the civil rights movement, founder of the first branch of the National Association for the Advancement of Colored People (NAACP) in Brevard County, Florida, and president of the state chapter of the NAACP.

Harry T. Moore and his wife, Harriette Moore, also an educator, were the victims of a bombing of their home in Mims, Florida on Christmas night 1951. As the local hospital in Titusville would not treat Blacks, he died on the way to the nearest one that would, Fernald-Laughton hospital in Sanford, Florida, about 30 miles to the northwest. His wife died from her wounds nine days later, on January 3, 1952, at the same hospital. This followed their both having been fired from teaching because of their activism.

The murder case was investigated, including by the FBI in 1951–1952, but no one was ever prosecuted. Two more investigations were conducted in the 1970s and 1990s. A state investigation and forensic work in 2005–2006 resulted in naming the likely perpetrators as four Ku Klux Klan members, all long dead by that time. Harry T. Moore was the first NAACP member and official to be assassinated for civil rights activism; the couple are the only husband and wife to be killed for the movement. Moore has been called the first martyr of this stage of the civil rights movement that expanded in the 1960s.

In the early 1930s, Moore had become state secretary for the Florida chapter of the NAACP. Through his registration activities, he greatly increased the number of members, and he worked on issues of housing and education. He investigated lynchings, filed lawsuits against voter registration barriers and white primaries, and worked for equal pay for black teachers in public schools.

Moore also led the Progressive Voters League. Following a 1944 US Supreme Court ruling against white primaries, between 1944 and 1950, he succeeded in increasing the registration of black voters in Florida to 31 percent of those eligible to vote, markedly higher than in any other Southern state.

== Early life and family ==
Harry Tyson Moore was born on November 18, 1905, in Houston, Florida.

Both the Moores completed college degrees at Bethune Cookman College, a historically black college in Daytona Beach. Harry T. earned a bachelor's degree in education in 1936. Harriet earned both an associate's degree in education in 1941 and a bachelor's degree in education in 1950. Both their daughters also earned college degrees at Bethune Cookman College.

== Civil rights activism ==
In 1934, soon after the birth of their daughters, the Moores founded the Brevard County chapter of the NAACP. Moore also helped organize the statewide NAACP organization. Through his registration activities, he greatly increased the number of members, and he worked on issues of housing and education. He investigated lynchings, filed lawsuits against voter registration barriers and white primaries, and worked for equal pay for black teachers in public schools, although they were segregated.

In 1946 both Moores were fired from their teaching jobs because of their activism; Harry Moore was working to gain equal pay for Black public school teachers in the Brevard County segregated school system. Such economic retaliation was widely used in Southern states to discourage activism. Harry Moore accepted a paid position with the NAACP in order to survive economically.

Moore also led the Progressive Voters League. Following a 1944 US Supreme Court ruling against white primaries as unconstitutional (which the Democratic Party had used as another means of excluding blacks from politics), between 1944 and 1950, Moore succeeded in increasing the registration of black voters in Florida to 31 percent of those eligible to vote, markedly higher than in any other Southern state.

== Groveland case ==
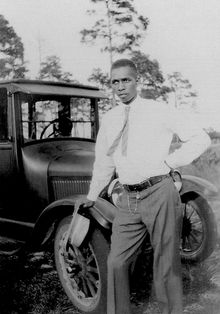
Undated photo of Moore

In July 1949, four black men were accused of raping a white woman in Groveland, Florida. Ernest Thomas fled the county and was killed by a posse; the other three suspects were arrested and beaten while held in custody, forcing two to confess. Rumors accompanied the case against a background of post-war tensions resulting from problems in absorbing veterans into jobs and American society. In Groveland, a white mob of more than 400 demanded that the sheriff, Willis V. McCall, who had hidden the prisoners to protect them, hand the prisoners over for lynching. The mob left the jail and went on a rampage, burning buildings in the black district of town. McCall asked the governor to send in the National Guard, but six days were needed to restore order.

The three young men, one 16 years of age and a minor, were found guilty by an all-white jury. The judge sentenced 16-year-old Charles Greenlee to life in prison; Sam Shepherd and Walter Irvin were sentenced to death.

Executive Director of the Florida NAACP, Harry T. Moore, organized a campaign against what he saw as the wrongful convictions of the three men. With NAACP support, appeals were pursued. In April 1951, a legal team headed by Thurgood Marshall won the appeal of Shepherd and Irvin's convictions before the U.S. Supreme Court. A new trial was scheduled.

County Sheriff McCall was responsible for transporting Shepherd and Irvin to the new trial venue in November 1951. He claimed that the two men, both handcuffed, attacked him in an escape attempt. He shot them both, and Shepherd died at the scene. Irvin survived his wounds; he later claimed to NAACP and FBI officials that the sheriff shot both him and Shepherd in cold blood. Moore called for an indictment against Sheriff McCall and called on Florida Governor Fuller Warren to suspend McCall from office.

== Murder ==
Six weeks later on Christmas night, 1951, on the Moores' 25th wedding anniversary, a bomb went off beneath the couple's house in Mims, Florida. Both were fatally injured; Moore died on the way to the hospital in Sanford, Florida, which was about 30 miles away but was the closest to serve African Americans. His wife died from her injuries nine days later at the same hospital.

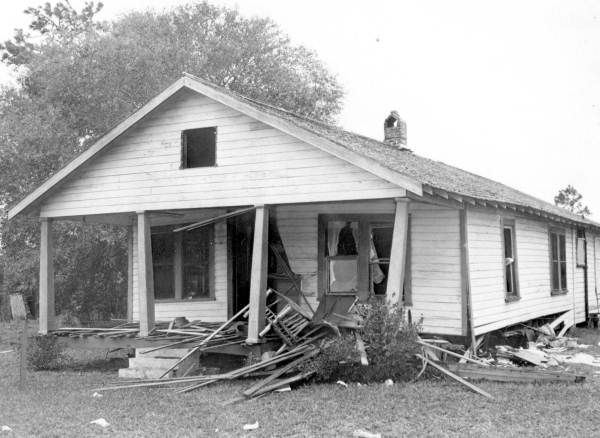
Photograph of the bombed out home of Harry T. Moore and Harriette V. Moore

Moore has been called the first martyr in the civil rights movement. He was the first NAACP official assassinated in the civil rights struggle. He and his wife were the first couple to be killed for civil rights.

The murders caused a national and international outcry, with protests registered at the United Nations against violence in the South. The NAACP held a huge rally in New York, and in other cities, too. In many respects, the protests over the Moores' murders were a fore runner of demonstrations during the civil rights movement. The NAACP sponsored a fundraising event at Madison Square Garden, where a song entitled "The Ballad of Harry Moore" was performed, with lyrics by the poet Langston Hughes.

The State of Florida called the Federal Bureau of Investigation (FBI) to head the investigation, but the case was never solved and no one was ever prosecuted. The FBI was convinced that the Ku Klux Klan had committed the bombing and identified a number of local Klansmen as suspects, but was never able to find enough evidence to bring charges. Eventually, the FBI indicted seven Klansmen for lying about their involvement in other racial violence in the hope that the pressure of the indictments would force some of the Klansmen to crack and testify about the Moore case. However, the ploy did not work, and the indictments were eventually dismissed. The FBI eventually closed the Moore investigation in 1953.

The case has been reopened three times: in 1978 by Brevard County, in 1991–1992 by the Florida Department of Law Enforcement (FDLE), and in 2005 by Florida Attorney General Charlie Crist. In October 2006, three weeks before winning the Republican primary for governor, Crist held a press conference in Mims and claimed to have "resolved" the case. Although he said that his investigation found no new evidence, Crist identified four Klansmen, then dead, as the likely perpetrators.

In the next few weeks, however, the Crist investigation was roundly criticized by Moore scholars, FDLE investigators, and newspaper editorial boards. It was largely dismissed as a political attempt to win black votes.

When the Moores were killed, the risk to civil rights activists and any blacks in the South was high and continued to be so. According to a later report from the NAACP's Southern Regional Council in Atlanta, the homes of 40 black Southern families were bombed during 1951 and 1952. Some, like Harry Moore, were activists whose work exposed them to danger, but most were either people who had refused to bow to racist convention or simply "innocent bystanders, unsuspecting victims of random white terrorism".

For example, bombing was especially prevalent in Birmingham, Alabama, in the 1950s and was used by independent KKK groups to intimidate middle-class blacks who were moving into new neighborhoods.

== Legacy and honors ==
- Langston Hughes wrote, and read publicly, the poem "The Ballad of Harry Moore", written posthumously in Moore's honor:

Florida means land of flowers
It was on a Christmas night.
In the state named for the flowers
Men came bearing dynamite ...
It could not be in Jesus' name
Beneath the bedroom floor
On Christmas night the killers
Hid the bomb for Harry Moore.

- In 2000, Bernice Johnson Reagon set Langston Hughes 1952 poem to music, titled "Ballad of Harry T. Moore", which she sang with her founding group Sweet Honey in the Rock in 2003, and put on their 2003 album called The Women Gather and on their 2005 live album Raise Your Voice!
- In 1952, Moore posthumously was awarded the Spingarn Medal by the NAACP for outstanding achievement by an African American.

Although the story of the Moores' lives receded into obscurity for years, interest in them has been revived in the late 20th century by books, documentaries, and a new investigation of their murders. New memorials have been named or designated in their honor. For example:

- In 1999, the state of Florida approved designation of the Moores' home site as a Florida Heritage Landmark, and Brevard County started restoring the site.
- By 2004, the Brevard County had created the Harry T. and Harriette Moore Memorial Park and Interpretive Center at the home site in Mims.
- Brevard County named its Justice Center after the Moores and included material there about their lives and work.
- Harry T. Moore Avenue in Mims, Florida is named after him.
- In March 2013, the Harry T. and Harriette V. Moore Post Office in Cocoa, Florida was named in their honor.
- In 2012, the Florida Legislature designated State Road 46 (SR-46) in Brevard County as the Harry T. and Harriette V. Moore Memorial Highway.
- In 2013, Harry T. and Harriette V. Moore were inducted into the Florida Civil Rights Hall of Fame.

== 21st century investigation ==
The state twice, in 1999 and 2005, returned to the Moore murders but was unable to file charges, since most of the men whom it suspected in the crime had died.

In 1999, journalist Ben Green published a book based on his research of the case: Before His Time: The Untold Story of Harry T. Moore, America's First Civil Rights Martyr. His research had gone deeply into FBI files. Green's book was followed by a Public Broadcasting Service (PBS) show about Moore's life, Freedom Never Dies: The Legacy of Harry T. Moore (2000).

In 2005, Florida Attorney General Charlie Crist re-opened a state investigation of Harry and Harriette Moore's deaths. The Moores' only surviving daughter, Juanita Evangeline Moore, encouraged Crist in the efforts to uncover the identity of her parents' killers.

Forensics teams combed the former site of the Moores' house for evidence (the site is now within a memorial park). On August 16, 2006, Crist announced the results of the work of the state Office of Civil Rights and the Florida Department of Law Enforcement. Rumors linking Sheriff Willis V. McCall to the crime were proven false. Based on extensive evidence, the state concluded that the Moores were victims of a conspiracy by members of a Central Florida Klavern of the Ku Klux Klan (KKK).

The investigators published a report naming the following four individuals, all of whom had reputations for violence, as having been directly involved:

- Earl J. Brooklyn, a Klansman known for being exceedingly violent, who had floor plans of the Moores' home and was recruiting volunteers for an attack. He died about a year after the attack, apparently of natural causes.
- Tillman H. Belvin, another violent Klansman, was a close friend of Brooklyn's. He also died of natural causes about a year after the attack.
- Joseph Neville Cox, secretary of the Orange County, Florida chapter of the Klan, was believed to have ordered the attack. In 1952, he committed suicide after having been pressed with questioning and investigation by the FBI.
- Edward L. Spivey, also in the KKK. As he was dying of cancer in 1978, he implicated Cox in the attack, and claimed also to have been at the crime scene in 1951.

== See also ==
- Mabel Norris Reese
