= Gilbert King (author) =

American writer and photographer (born 1962)

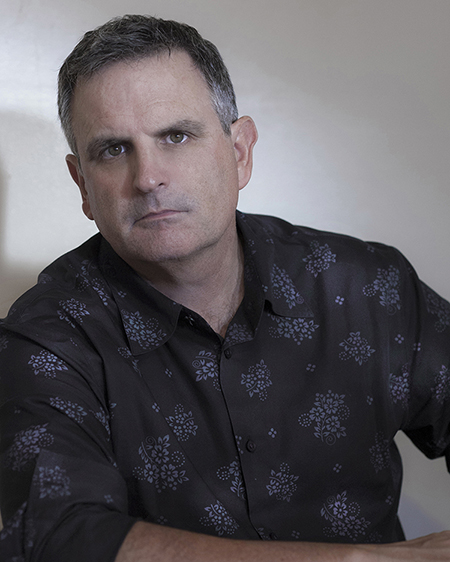
- King in 2013
- Born: Gilbert King; February 22, 1962 (age 64); Rockville Centre, New York, U.S.
- Occupations: Author, photographer
- Writing career
- Notable works: Devil in the Grove: Thurgood Marshall, The Groveland Boys, and the Dawn of a New America
- Notable awards: Pulitzer Prize for General Nonfiction, 2013
- Website: gilbertking.com

Gilbert King (born February 22, 1962) is an American writer and photographer, known best as the author of Devil in the Grove: Thurgood Marshall, the Groveland Boys, and the Dawn of a New America (2012), which won the Pulitzer Prize. He is also the writer, producer, and co-host of Bone Valley, the award-winning narrative podcast based on the Leo Schofield case, and released in 2022. King's previous book was The Execution of Willie Francis: Race, Murder, and the Search for Justice in the American South (2008) and his most recent is Beneath a Ruthless Sun: A True Story of Violence, Race, and Justice Lost and Found (2018).

He has written for The New York Times and The Washington Post, and he is a featured contributor to the Smithsonian's history blog Past Imperfect. His photography has appeared in many magazines including international editions of Vogue, Harper's Bazaar, Marie Claire, and Cosmopolitan.

== Early life and education ==
Gilbert King was born in 1962 in Rockville Center, New York and grew up in St. James, both on Long Island. When he was 12, he moved with his family to Schenectady, New York. King is a 1980 graduate of Niskayuna High School. He attended the University of South Florida, falling two math credits short of graduating before he decided to move to New York City. (On December 13, 2014, the university awarded King an Honorary Doctor of Humane Letters.)

== Career ==
In New York, King landed freelance writing and editing assignments for small newspapers and magazines. In 1991 he took a job with Macmillan Publishing as the assistant to the president and publisher. At the same time, as a self-taught photographer, he gained publication of his fashion and beauty work in national magazines such as Glamour, Jane, and Modern Bride, as well as international editions of magazines including Vogue, Harper's Bazaar, Madame Figaro, and Marie Claire. Among his clients were L'Oreal, Redken, Michael Kors, and Thierry Mugler.

By 2002, King began photographing coffee table books for different publishers. When a writer withdrew from a golf antiques project, King was asked if he would take over researching and writing the book. For the next several years, King wrote various illustrated books, as well as ghostwriting for celebrities and noted experts in their fields. Since 2008, he has published two major works of non-fiction exploring issues in US civil rights history. He won the Pulitzer Prize in 2013 for his book on Thurgood Marshall, attorney for the NAACP Legal Defense Fund in the 1949 case of the Groveland Boys. He created and hosted the 2022 Lava For Good podcast Bone Valley about the 1987 murder of Michelle Schofield.

== Books ==
=== The Execution of Willie Francis ===
The Execution of Willie Francis: Race, Murder, and the Search for Justice in the American South (2008) was published by Basic Civitas Books. It explores the life of Willie Francis, a 16-year-old African-American youth in Louisiana who, in 1946, survived being sentenced to death by the electric chair. His case became an international media story. His case was taken on appeal to the U.S. Supreme Court by Bertrand DeBlanc, a young Cajun lawyer. Francis had been convicted of killing DeBlanc's good friend, Andrew Thomas. King reveals the backstage lobbying among the justices and Justice Frankfurter's regret about voting against his conscience in favor of allowing the execution to proceed.

==== Reception ====
Counterpunch magazine said it was "almost certainly the best book on capital punishment in America since Mailer's, The Executioner's Song." Booklist notes how "Drawing on extensive research and interviews, King offers a compelling page-turner that examines American racism and justice in the region." In two starred reviews, Kirkus Reviews described the book as "strangely charming and unforgettable" and Library Journal said, "Highly recommended ... From the first page to the last, King holds our attention with gripping and disturbing details."

=== Devil in the Grove ===
Devil in the Grove: Thurgood Marshall, the Groveland Boys, and the Dawn of a New America (HarperCollins, 2012) explores another case of racial injustice. King won the annual Pulitzer Prize for General Nonfiction in 2013 for this book.

In 1949 four young African-American men were falsely accused of raping a seventeen-year-old white farm girl in Groveland, Florida and were convicted by an all-white jury, at a time in which Jim Crow laws were still in effect. Attorney Thurgood Marshall, then the special counsel with the NAACP's Legal Defense Fund, represented the Groveland Boys, taking their case to the U.S. Supreme Court, which ultimately overturned the guilty verdicts.

In reaction to the Court's decision, the Ku Klux Klan initiated a wave of violence and murder in central Florida. Three of the four defendants were shot, two fatally. An NAACP colleague was murdered. Marshall continued with the retrial under constant death threats.

During his research, King gained access to the FBI's extensive and unredacted files from the case, which had been sealed for 60 years. He was also granted permission to view the Legal Defense Fund's files from the Groveland case.

==== Reception ====
The Pulitzer Prize cited this book as "a richly detailed chronicle of racial injustice in the Florida town of Groveland in 1949, involving four black men falsely accused of rape and drawing a civil rights crusader, and eventual Supreme Court justice, into the legal battle." Thomas Friedman of The New York Times called it "must-read, cannot-put-down history" and Pulitzer-winning novelist Junot Diaz called it "superb". Devil in the Grove has also been nominated for The Chautauqua Prize, was the runner-up in nonficiton for the Dayton Literary Peace Prize, and a finalist for the Edgar Award for Best Fact Crime.

Lionsgate acquired the film rights in 2013 and deemed the project as "high priority".

=== Beneath a Ruthless Sun ===
With the subtitle, A True Story of Violence, Race, and Justice Lost and Found, In King's third book, he returns to Lake County, Florida with the story of Jesse Daniels, a white, mentally disabled youth who is framed for a rape he did not commit. The story depicts the struggles of reporter Mabel Norris Reese, who is targeted by the Ku Klux Klan and Sheriff Willis McCall, and a young lawyer, Richard Graham, and their efforts to prove that Daniels is an innocent man. The book was published by Riverhead Books in April 2018.

==== Reception ====
The New York Times Book Review wrote that Beneath a Ruthless Sun"exposes the sinister complexity of American racism...with grace and sensitivity, and [King's] narrative never flags. His mastery of the materials is complete." The book was also awarded the Florida Book Awards' Gold Medal in Nonfiction in 2018, and was optioned in 2022 by Indie Atlantic Films.

== Podcast ==
=== Bone Valley ===
The 9-part narrative podcast about Leo Schofield's conviction for the 1987 murder of his wife, Michelle in Polk County, Florida. King, with producer and co-host Kelsey Decker, spent four years investigating this case. Bone Valley was released in September 2022 by Lava for Good and was named on numerous Podcast of the Year lists, including New Yorker, The Atlantic, Slate, and The Guardian. The podcast also received two Ambie Awards in 2023 for Best Documentary and Best Reporting from The Podcast Academy.

==== Reception ====
Along with Beth Shelburne's Earwitness, another true crime podcast produced by Lava for Good, Bone Valley was named one of the 30 best true crime podcasts of all time by Entertainment Weekly.

The Atlantic called Bone Valley "a true-crime marvel, standing alongside 'The Innocent Man' by Pamela Colloff, in the pantheon of reportage about wrongful convictions." The Irish Times called it a "deeply compassionate telling of a complex story, grounded in persistent and principled journalism." While The Guardian described it as "Dogged and meticulous, with a spine of moral certainty, it makes other true crime podcasts look lazy simply through its completeness…a grinding indictment of the U.S. criminal justice system."
