= Harriette Moore =

Educator and civil rights activist (1902–1952)

- Born: Harriette Vyda Simms; June 19, 1902; West Palm Beach, Florida, U.S.
- Died: January 3, 1952 (aged 49); Sanford, Florida, U.S.
- Cause of death: Assassination by bombing
- Occupations: Educator, civil rights pioneer
- Spouse: Harry T. Moore (m. 1926; died 1951)
- Children: 2

Harriette Vyda Simms Moore (June 19, 1902 – January 3, 1952) was an American educator and civil rights worker. She was the wife of Harry T. Moore, who founded the first branch of the National Association for the Advancement of Colored People (NAACP) in Brevard County, Florida. The murder of the Moores was the first assassination to happen during the Civil Rights Movement and the only time both a husband and a wife were killed for their activism.

== Early life ==
Harriette Vyda Simms was born in West Palm Beach, Florida, on June 19, 1902, to David Ira Simms (a wood lathe worker) and Annie (Warren) Simms. Her sisters were Valerie and Mae, and her brothers were George, Arnold, Rupert, and David Jr. The family relocated to Mims, Florida. As a youth, Harriette spent summers working in Massillon, Ohio with her father. She attended the segregated Daytona Normal and Industrial School in Daytona Beach, Florida. She later graduated from Bethune-Cookman College, a historically black college in Daytona Beach, with an Associate of Arts degree in 1941 and a Bachelor of Science degree in 1950.

Simms taught elementary school classes for many years in Merritt Island and Mims in Brevard County, and in Lake Park, Florida until her death. In Mims, she helped to cook lunch every day for the pupils.

Simms met Harry Tyson Moore while she was teaching classes in Brevard County. He was then working as principal of the Titusville Colored School. They married on December 25, 1926, and had two daughters together: Annie Rosalea (known as Peaches, 1928–1972) and Juanita Evangeline (known as Evangeline, 1930–2015)..

== Civil rights activism ==
Soon after the births of their daughters, the Moores founded the Brevard County chapter of the NAACP in 1934. Harry Moore later helped to organize the statewide NAACP organization.

In 1946, both Moores were fired by the Brevard County public school system and blacklisted for their political activities.

== Murder ==
On Christmas night, 1951, the Moores were fatally injured at their home in Mims by a bomb that went off beneath their house. It was their 25th wedding anniversary. Harry died on the way to the hospital in Sanford, Florida. Harriette died from her injuries nine days later at the hospital in Sanford.

Although the state called in the Federal Bureau of Investigation (FBI) to investigate, no one was indicted for the bombing and murders of the Moores. Renewed attention was brought to the case by a 1999 biography of Moore, describing him as the first civil rights martyr, and a 2000 PBS program about his life and legacy.

The Florida Attorney General re-opened an investigation into the murders in 2005, 54 years later. In its 2005–2006 reinvestigation, the State of Florida concluded that the bombing murder of the Moores had been the work of violent members of a central Florida Ku Klux Klan group and named the four chief suspects, all of whom had died. There were eleven other bombings against black families in Florida the year that the Moores were killed.

The risk to activists and any blacks in the South was high and remained so. According to a later report from the NAACP's Southern Regional Council in Atlanta, the homes of 40 black Southern families were bombed during 1951 and 1952. Some, like the Moores, were activists, but most were either people who had refused to bow to racist convention or simply "innocent bystanders, unsuspecting victims of random white terrorism."

== Honors ==
Although the story of the Moores' lives faded into obscurity for many years, the late-20th-century reopening of the case provided a new appreciation for their work.

In 1999, Florida approved designation of the homesite of the Moores as a Florida Heritage Landmark. Brevard County started restoring the site. Supplemented by independent funding, by 2004 the county had created the Harry T. and Harriette Moore Memorial Park and Interpretive Center at the homesite in Mims. Brevard County named its Justice Center after the Moores and included material there about their lives and work.

== Recent developments ==
The State of Florida twice returned to the case but was unable to file charges, as most of the men suspected to have been involved in the crime had died. In 1999, journalist Ben Green published a book based on his research of the case, Before His Time: The Untold Story of Harry T. Moore, America's First Civil Rights Martyr.

In 2005, Florida Attorney General Charlie Crist reopened a state investigation of Harry and Harriette Moore's deaths. On August 16, 2006, Crist announced the results of the work of the state Office of Civil Rights and the Florida Department of Law Enforcement. Rumors that had linked Sheriff Willis V. McCall to the crime were proven false. Based on extensive evidence, the state concluded that the Moores were victims of a conspiracy by members of a central Florida Klavern of the Ku Klux Klan. The report named the following four individuals, all of whom had reputations for violence, as directly involved:

- Earl J. Brooklyn, a Klansman known for being exceedingly violent, was discovered to have had floor plans of the Moores' home and was recruiting volunteers.
- Tillman H. Belvin, another violent Klansman, was a close friend of Brooklyn.
- Joseph Neville Cox, secretary of the Orange County, Florida chapter of the Klan, was believed to have ordered the attack. On March 30, 1952, he committed suicide after he was questioned by the FBI.
- As he lay dying of cancer in 1978, the Klansman Edward L. Spivey claimed to have been at the crime scene in 1951, and he implicated Cox in the attack.

Both Brooklyn and Belvin died in 1952. The Moores' younger daughter, Juanita Evangeline Moore, joined former Attorney General Crist in the efforts to uncover the identity of her parents' killers. She was a 1951 graduate of Bethune-Cookman College and a retired government employee. She died on October 26, 2015, in New Carrollton, Maryland.

== See also ==
- African-American history
- Civil Rights Memorial
