= Groveland Four =

African Americans falsely accused of rape in 1949

The Groveland Four (or the Groveland Boys) were four African American teens, Ernest Thomas, Charles Greenlee, Samuel Shepherd, and Walter Irvin. In July 1949, the four were accused of raping a white woman and severely beating her husband in Lake County, Florida. The oldest, Thomas, tried to elude capture and was killed that month. The others were put on trial. Shepard and Irvin received death sentences, and Greenlee was sentenced to life in prison. The events of the case led to serious questions about the arrests, allegedly coerced confessions and mistreatment, and the unusual sentencing following their convictions. Their incarceration was exacerbated by their systemic and unlawful treatment—including the death of Shepherd, and the near-fatal shooting of Irvin. Greenlee was paroled in 1962 and Irvin in 1968. All four were posthumously exonerated by the state of Florida in 2021.

== Details ==
Thomas, Shepherd, Irvin, and Greenlee (then 16) were accused of raping 17-year-old Norma Padgett and assaulting her husband on July 16, 1949, in Groveland, Lake County, Florida.

On July 26, 1949, Thomas fled and was killed by a sheriff's posse of 1,000 white men, who shot him over 400 times while he allegedly fled after being found asleep under a tree in southern Madison County. Greenlee, Shepherd, and Irvin were arrested. They were beaten to coerce confessions, but Irvin refused to confess. The three survivors were convicted at trial by an all-white jury. Greenlee was sentenced to life in prison because he was only 16 at the time of the alleged crime; the other two were sentenced to death.

In 1949, Harry T. Moore, the executive director of the Florida NAACP, organized a campaign against the wrongful conviction of the three African Americans. Two years later, the case of two defendants reached the Supreme Court of the United States on appeal, with special counsel of the NAACP Legal Defense Fund Thurgood Marshall as their defense counsel. In 1951, the U.S. Supreme Court ordered a retrial after hearing the appeals of Shepherd and Irvin. It ruled they had not received a fair trial because no evidence had been presented, because of excessive adverse publicity, as well as because black people had been excluded from the jury. The court overturned the convictions and remanded the case to the lower court for a new trial.

In November 1951, Sheriff Willis V. McCall of Lake County, Florida shot Irvin and Shepherd while they were in his custody and handcuffed together. McCall claimed they had tried to escape while he was transporting them from Raiford State Prison back to the county seat of Tavares for the new trial. Shepherd died on the spot; Irvin survived and later told FBI investigators that McCall had shot them in cold blood and that his deputy, Yates, had also shot him in an attempt to kill him. Harry Moore called for the Governor of Florida to suspend McCall. On Christmas Night 1951, a bomb went off below Moore's house, fatally wounding both him and his wife; he died that night and his wife followed nine days later. The bombers were never caught.

At the second trial, Irvin was represented by Marshall and again convicted by an all-white jury and sentenced to death. In 1955, his death sentence was commuted to life in prison by recently elected Governor LeRoy Collins. He was paroled in 1968, but died the next year in Lake County, purportedly of natural causes. Greenlee was paroled in 1962 and lived with his family until he died in 2012. In 2016, the City of Groveland and Lake County each apologized to survivors of the four men for the injustice against them. On April 18, 2017, a resolution of the Florida House of Representatives requested that all four men be exonerated. The Florida Senate quickly passed a similar resolution; lawmakers called on Governor Rick Scott to officially pardon the men. On January 11, 2019, the Florida Board of Executive Clemency voted to pardon the Groveland Four. Newly elected Governor Ron DeSantis subsequently did so. On November 22, 2021, Judge Heidi Davis granted the state's motion to posthumously exonerate the men.

== The accused ==
=== Charles L. Greenlee ===
Charles L. Greenlee (born 4 June 1933, Florida), was the son of Thomas H. and Emma Greenlee, who were born in Georgia and Alabama, respectively. His family was living in Columbia County when he was two, but they had moved to Baker County by the time Charles was 12. His father worked in turpentine manufacturing in 1935 and later as a laborer, likely also in the timber industry. In 1945, Charles and four of his siblings were all in school. Greenlee had come to Groveland in July 1949 looking for work, as he was already married and his wife was pregnant.

=== Walter Irvin ===
Walter Lee Irvin (born 8 May 1927, Gainesville, Florida), was living in Groveland when he registered for the draft in May 1945. He listed his mother Ellia Irvin as next of kin. He was working at the time for Apshawa Groves. He was recorded as 5'3" and weighing 105 pounds, and was described in his registration as "light brown", with brown eyes and black hair. He served in the Army, leaving with the rank of private.

=== Samuel Shepherd ===
Samuel Shepherd (born 7 April 1927) was born in Fitzgerald, Georgia to Henry Shepherd and his wife Charlie M (Robinson) Shepherd, both of Georgia. His father was working in the lumber industry. The Shepherd family moved to Groveland, Florida, where his father achieved ownership of his own farm by clearing and developing former swamp land. When Samuel Shepherd registered for the draft in 1945, he was described as 5'8", 149 pounds, with a light brown complexion, brown eyes and black hair. He gave his father Henry Shepherd as next of kin. Shepherd and Irvin were friends and fellow veterans after World War II.

=== Ernest Thomas ===
Ernest Thomas (born Florida), was married by July 1949 and living and working near Groveland. He had encouraged Greenlee to come there because of jobs related to the citrus groves.

After returning to Groveland following their military service, Shepherd and Irvin both continued to wear their uniforms. They were proud of their service, which some of the local whites resented. Sheriff Willis McCall was known for supporting segregation, and keeping a strong hold on workers and against union organizing. He was part of ensuring there was a ready supply of low-wage workers to man the orange groves. Shepherd could work with his father, and Irvin was determined to find an alternative to the orange groves.

== Events ==
Ernest Thomas, Charles Greenlee (age 16); Samuel Shepherd (age 22), and Walter Irvin (age 22), were identified by the police as suspects. Shepherd and Irvin were both veterans of service in the Army; and both Thomas and Greenlee were married.

Irvin and Shepherd were arrested shortly after Padgett reported the attack. The police took the men in their patrol car to a secluded spot and ordered them out of the car. Both men were beaten by police with blackjacks and fists and kicked as they lay on the ground, while being asked if they had picked up a white girl. Afterward, they were taken to the spot where the crime happened. Deputy Yates inspected Shepherd's shoes, which he had worn the night before. Yates was frustrated to see that the soles did not match footprints in the ground at the scene. Irvin's were the same, but Irvin claimed that he was wearing a different pair of shoes. The two men were taken to Tavares jail, where they were interrogated in the basement while cuffed to overhead pipes and severely beaten. A mob rioted and burned Shepherd's house and two others to the ground. Only the presence of the National Guard halted the destruction caused by the rioters. Cockcroft, the leader of the riot, revealed the mob's intentions when he told a reporter, "The next time, we'll clean out every Negro section in south Lake County."

=== Fleeing suspect ===
Charles Greenlee was a 16-year-old who had come from Gainesville and was trying to find work with his friend Ernest Thomas. Thomas had convinced Greenlee that there were plenty of jobs in Groveland. Greenlee was waiting at a rail depot to meet Thomas when he was arrested and brought to the police station under suspicion. Greenlee was interrogated and beaten in a cell that night until he admitted to the rape of Norma Padgett. Thomas escaped capture and fled Lake County the following morning. Greenlee admitted to having been with Thomas. Police learned where the latter lived and where he was hiding, as they found a letter in his letterbox addressed to his wife.

Lake County Sheriff Willis McCall appointed a posse of more than 1000 armed men. They found and killed Thomas about 200 miles (320 km) away in Madison County, Florida, following a lengthy chase through the swamps. He was shot by the posse at least 400 times and died of his wounds; officers reported that Thomas was armed and allegedly reached for a weapon. According to the coroner's inquest, Lake County Sheriff McCall was at the scene when Thomas was shot. The coroner's jury determined that Thomas had been lawfully killed and ruled his death a justifiable homicide.

== Trial ==
A grand jury indicted the three remaining rape suspects. Shepherd and Greenlee separately later told FBI investigators that the deputies beat them until they confessed. Irvin refused to confess, despite also being severely beaten. An FBI investigation concluded that Lake County Sheriff's Department deputies James Yates and Leroy Campbell were responsible for the beatings, and agents documented the physical abuse with photographs. The Justice Department urged the U.S. Attorney in Tampa to file charges, but U.S. Attorney Herbert Phillips was reluctant, and failed to return indictments.

The NAACP helped with the men's defense, hiring Orlando attorney Franklin Williams. After interviewing the three surviving suspects, Williams said each had independently stated that he was beaten by Lake County deputies. Shepherd and Greenlee both told FBI agents that they confessed to raping Padgett in order to stop the beatings. Irvin never confessed and maintained his innocence.

Thurgood Marshall, the lead lawyer of the NAACP, pressed the Justice Department and the FBI to initiate a civil rights and domestic violence investigation into the beatings. Marshall convinced the Justice Department that the beatings violated the men's rights, and the FBI dispatched agents to investigate. The FBI later concluded that Lake County deputies James Yates and Leroy Campbell had violated the Groveland men's civil rights and urged U.S. Attorney Herbert Phillips of Florida to prosecute, but a grand jury did not return indictments of the deputies.

The prosecution never introduced the coerced confessions as evidence into the trial.

There is uncertainty about whether Padgett was raped. The prosecution did not question Dr. Geoffrey Binneveld, the physician who examined her, on the stand. Judge Truman Futch did not permit the defense to call the doctor as a witness. According to his records, Binneveld could not tell whether she had been raped. He found no evidence of tears or wounds in the vagina other than the lacerations mentioned above. Laboratory analysis of a vaginal smear revealed no spermatozoa present in the vagina, nor any organisms resembling gonococci, which could have been other evidence of sex. There were no other gross signs of bruises, breaks in the skin or other signs of violence.

Shepherd and Irvin said that they had been together drinking in Eatonville, Florida, the night of the alleged attack. Greenlee said he was nowhere near the other defendants on that night and that he had never met Shepherd and Irvin before.

The defense accused Sheriff McCall's deputies of manufacturing evidence to win a conviction. All three men were convicted by the all-white jury. Shepherd and Irvin were sentenced to death, and Greenlee, who was a minor, was sentenced to life.

== Appeals and shootings ==
The NAACP took on assisting the defense in appeals. In 1951 Marshall led the defense in an appeals hearing for Irvin and Shepherd at the U.S. Supreme Court. It overturned the convictions of both men based on adverse pre-trial publicity, and remanded the case to the lower court for a new trial. (Greenlee had not appealed his sentence of life imprisonment.)

McCall was transporting Shepherd and Irvin from Raiford State Prison back to the Lake County jail in Tavares when he claimed to have a flat tire. Alone with the two handcuffed prisoners, McCall pulled down a dirt road to inspect the tire, outside Umatilla, Florida, north of Tavares. He claimed that Shepherd asked to relieve himself, and when the two prisoners, cuffed together, got out of the car, they attacked McCall. He drew his pistol and shot at them. The shooting took place on a dark country road outside the town. He shot each prisoner three times. Shepherd was killed instantly, and Irvin survived by playing dead.

The following morning, at the hospital where he had been taken for treatment, Irvin told FBI agents and reporter Mabel Norris Reese that the shooting was unprovoked. He said McCall had shot him and Shepherd in cold blood, staging the scene to make it look like an escape attempt, and that Lake County Deputy James Yates had joined McCall at the scene, seen that Irvin was still breathing, and fired one last shot through Irvin's neck. Irvin survived. The FBI later found a bullet buried in the ground beneath Irvin's blood spot that appeared to support his account of the shooting. A nail found in the front wheel of McCall's car appeared to have caused his claimed "tire trouble" that night. McCall said that he had no idea how the nail got there, but the FBI believed that it had been placed there.

An all-white coroner's jury, made up of many of McCall's friends, took half an hour to find Shepherd's death justified. They concluded that McCall had been acting in line of duty and in self-defense. McCall was cleared of any wrongdoing.

=== Harry T. Moore bombing ===
Harry T. Moore, executive director of the Florida NAACP, demanded in 1951 that McCall be indicted for murder following the Groveland rape case, and requested that the governor suspend him from office. Six weeks after calling for McCall's removal, Moore and his wife were killed by a bomb that exploded under their bedroom in Mims, Brevard County, Florida on December 25, 1951, but an extensive FBI investigation at the time and additional separate investigations in 1978, 1991, and 2005 found no evidence of McCall's involvement.

In 2005, a new investigation was launched by the Florida Department of Law Enforcement that included excavation of the Moore home to search for forensic evidence. On August 16, 2006, Florida Attorney General Charlie Crist announced his office had completed its 20-month investigation, resulting in the naming of four then suspects—Earl Brooklyn, Tillman Belvin, Joseph Cox and Edward Spivey—all deceased. All four had had a long history with the Ku Klux Klan, serving as officers in the Orange County Klavern. Although members of the Klan were suspected of the crime, the people responsible were never brought to trial.

== Irvin's second trial and later life ==
After recovering from his shooting wounds, Irvin was tried again after refusing a deal from the prosecutor and Governor Fuller Warren that would have spared him from a death sentence if he pleaded guilty. His defense counsel, Thurgood Marshall, gained a change of venue to Marion County, Florida, because of the extensive and adverse publicity around the case in Lake County. Marshall led the defense team from the NAACP Legal Defense Fund. Irvin was again found guilty. Judge Futch, who was again presiding, sentenced him to death.

After LeRoy Collins was elected governor in 1954, questions were raised to him about Irvin's case, because he was considered moderate. He reviewed it and in 1955 commuted Irvin's sentence to life in prison, stating that neither trial proved conclusively that Irvin was guilty beyond a reasonable doubt. Irvin was paroled in 1968. In 1969 he visited Lake County, where he was found dead in his car, officially of natural causes.

== Greenlee paroled ==
Greenlee was paroled from prison in 1962. He moved to Nashville, Tennessee, with his wife and their daughter Carole, who was born in 1950 (his wife was pregnant when he was arrested). They had a son, Thomas, in 1965. Greenlee died on April 18, 2012, but not before seeing Gilbert King's 2012 book about the case published.

== Exoneration ==
In 2016 the Lake [County Commission] followed Groveland Mayor Tim Loucks (Groveland Proclamation 2-16-2016)in presenting the surviving families of the Groveland Four with a posthumous apology. Both Loucks and members of the Lake County Commission then began lobbying state lawmakers to do the same. Senator Geraldine Thompson, D-Orlando, filed a proposed resolution (SCR 136) for consideration during the 2016 legislative session to clear the names of Greenlee, Irvin, Shepherd, and Thomas and note the "egregious wrongs" the criminal justice system perpetrated against them.

On April 18, 2017, the Florida House of Representatives passed a resolution sponsored by State Representative Bobby DuBose requesting exoneration for the four men and apologizing to their families for the injustice of the case. The Florida State Senate passed an identical resolution sponsored by Senator Gary Farmer on April 27, 2017. The resolutions called on Governor Rick Scott to expedite the process to grant posthumous pardons. Lawmakers also called on Scott to pardon the men.

On January 11, 2019, the Florida Board of Executive Clemency, with newly seated Governor Ron DeSantis at the helm, unanimously agreed to pardon the Groveland Four. "Seventy years is a long time", DeSantis said before taking office. "And that's the amount of time four young men have been wrongly written into Florida history for crimes they did not commit and punishments they did not deserve." Norma Padgett, then 86, speaking publicly about the case for the first time since 1952, attended the Clemency Board hearing to make a statement against exoneration, saying:

I'm beggin' y'all not to give them pardon because they done it. Your minds might be made up. I don't know. If you do, y'all going to be just like them, and that's all I got to say, 'cause I know I'm telling the truth. I went to court twice.

DeSantis issued the four men full posthumous pardons in 2019, but they were not exonerated by the state until 2021. After a motion submitted by State Attorney William M. Gladson, Judge Heidi Davis granted the state's motion on November 22, 2021, to posthumously dismiss the indictments of Thomas and Shepherd and vacate the convictions of Greenlee and Irvin.

Padgett, who eventually moved to Taylor County, Georgia, died on July 12, 2024.

== See also ==
- False accusations of rape as justification for lynchings
