= Mims, Florida =

- Unincorporated census-designated place
- Location in Brevard County and Florida
- Coordinates: 28°42′05″N 80°51′49″W
- Country: United States
- State: Florida
- County: Brevard

Area
  - Total: 22.37 sq mi (57.93 km^{2})
  - Land: 17.07 sq mi (44.21 km^{2})
  - Water: 5.30 sq mi (13.72 km^{2})
- Elevation: 20 ft (6.1 m)

Population (2020)
  - Total: 7,336
  - Density: 429.8/sq mi (165.93/km^{2})
- Time zone: UTC-5 (Eastern (EST))
  - Summer (DST): UTC-4 (EDT)
- ZIP code: 32754
- Area code: 321
- FIPS code: 12-45775
- GNIS feature ID: 2403294

Mims is a census-designated place (CDP) holding the single zip code 32754 located within Brevard County, Florida, United States. The population was 7,336 at the 2020 census. It is part of the Palm Bay—Melbourne—Titusville Metropolitan Statistical Area.

== Geography ==
According to the United States Census Bureau, the CDP has a total area of 22.4 square miles (57.9 km^{2}), of which 17.0 square miles (44.1 km^{2}) is land and 5.3 square miles (13.7 km^{2}), or 23.71%, is water.

This marks the eastern end of State Road 46 as here it intersects with I-95 (exit 223) , US1 at mile marker 373.457 where SR 46 stops and where west main street becomes east main street. This is also the first major junction east of Seminole County.

== Demographics ==
Historical population
Census	Pop.	Note	%±
1990	9,412		—
2000	9,147		−2.8%
2010	7,058		−22.8%
2020	7,336		3.9%
U.S. Decennial Census

=== 2020 census ===
As of the 2020 census, Mims had a population of 7,336. The median age was 51.4 years. 18.2% of residents were under the age of 18 and 26.6% of residents were 65 years of age or older. For every 100 females there were 102.7 males, and for every 100 females age 18 and over there were 100.4 males age 18 and over.

62.6% of residents lived in urban areas, while 37.4% lived in rural areas.

There were 3,098 households in Mims, of which 21.6% had children under the age of 18 living in them. Of all households, 49.0% were married-couple households, 21.0% were households with a male householder and no spouse or partner present, and 22.9% were households with a female householder and no spouse or partner present. About 28.0% of all households were made up of individuals and 15.6% had someone living alone who was 65 years of age or older.

There were 3,694 housing units, of which 16.1% were vacant. The homeowner vacancy rate was 0.9% and the rental vacancy rate was 11.9%.

Racial composition as of the 2020 census
Race	Number	Percent
White	5,922	80.7%
Black or African American	813	11.1%
American Indian and Alaska Native	35	0.5%
Asian	44	0.6%
Native Hawaiian and Other Pacific Islander	3	0.0%
Some other race	61	0.8%
Two or more races	458	6.2%
Hispanic or Latino (of any race)	293	4.0%

=== 2000 census ===
As of the census of 2000, there were 9,147 people, 3,591 households, and 2,574 families residing in the CDP. The population density was 462.0 inhabitants per square mile (178.4/km^{2}). There were 4,171 housing units at an average density of 210.7 per square mile (81.4/km^{2}). The racial makeup of the CDP was 86.57% White, 10.98% African American, 0.63% Native American, 0.22% Asian, 0.02% Pacific Islander, 0.26% from other races, and 1.31% from two or more races. Hispanic or Latino of any race were 1.54% of the population.

There were 3,591 households, out of which 28.6% had children under the age of 18 living with them, 55.6% were married couples living together, 11.4% had a female householder with no husband present, and 28.3% were non-families. 22.8% of all households were made up of individuals, and 10.8% had someone living alone who was 65 years of age or older. The average household size was 2.52 and the average family size was 2.95.

In the CDP, the population was spread out, with 24.0% under the age of 18, 6.2% from 18 to 24, 26.4% from 25 to 44, 25.6% from 45 to 64, and 17.8% who were 65 years of age or older. The median age was 41 years. For every 100 females, there were 98.3 males. For every 100 females age 18 and over, there were 95.9 males.

== Economy ==
=== Personal income ===
The median income for a household in the CDP was $35,216, and the median income for a family was $41,044. Males had a median income of $33,886 versus $21,925 for females. The per capita income for the CDP was $17,433. About 11.3% of families and 15.6% of the population were below the poverty line, including 20.5% of those under age 18 and 12.4% of those age 65 or over.

=== Industry ===
Praxair in Mims produces liquid oxygen for the Kennedy Space Center.

== History ==
Mims, Florida received its name after its earliest settlers; Britton J. Mims, Robert Mims, and Casper Neil Mims. The three brothers were reputedly distant relatives to Jesse James. Casper later established the first Mims general store circa 1876.

Henry Flagler's Florida East Coast Railway construction starting 1885 expanded the community. By 1893, with railroad in place, both Mims and neighboring city Titusville began shipping citrus and lumber to northern cities. By the end of the 19th century citrus farms began to dominate the local economy. Citrus remain central to Mims economy until the closure of Nevins fruit company in the 1980s.

The settlement was organized as a city in the early 1900s; continuing slow growth until the start of the great depression. During the first years of the great depression large numbers of residents reportedly left looking for work. Mims, unable to sustain a municipal government, subsequently reverted to an unincorporated township within Brevard County, Florida.

=== Murders of Harry and Harriette Moore ===
African-American civil rights leader Harry T. Moore and his family resided in Mims from at least the 1920s. Known as a national civil rights leader, teacher and founder of the Brevard County NAACP, he and his wife Harriette were targeted for assassination Christmas Eve, 1951; they received fatal injuries when a bomb exploded from under their home. Moore died in the blast; his wife survived until January 3, 1952 . Both of their daughters survived the attack. The murders were racially motivated and believed to have been committed by members of the Ku Klux Klan.

The FBI investigated the case in 1951–1952, and the county and state in the 1970s and 1990s. The state reinvestigated in 2005, after suspected perpetrators had died. No prosecutions or charges were ever brought against the perpetrator(s). Multiple sites in Mims and Brevard County are dedicated to the Moores including the Moore Memorial Park and Cultural Center in Mims.

== Education ==
There are three schools, one adult education center, and one childcare center located in Mims; two public and three private.

- ACE or Academic Community Enrichment (Private, Adult Education)
- Christ Aid Academy (Private, K-12)
- Devereux Center at Normandy School (Private, Childcare)
- Mims Elementary School (Public, K-6)
- Pinewood Elementary School (Public, K-6)

== Notable People ==
=== Living ===
- Ego Ferguson (1991- ) - NFL professional football player
- Melanie L. Campbell – President and CEO of the National Coalition on Black Civic Participation
- Ralphael Agee (2005- ) - Professional Actor

==== Deceased ====
- Dick Yelvington (1928–2013) – NFL professional football player
- Jesse Parish Jr. (1912-1989) - President of Nevins Fruit Company. Leader within the Florida Citrus Industry.
- Harriette Moore (1902–1952) – educator and civil rights worker
- Harry T. Moore (1905–1951) – pioneer leader of the civil rights movement
