= Historic Old Town Commercial District =

Historic district in Florida, United States

- U.S. National Register of Historic Places
- U.S. Historic district
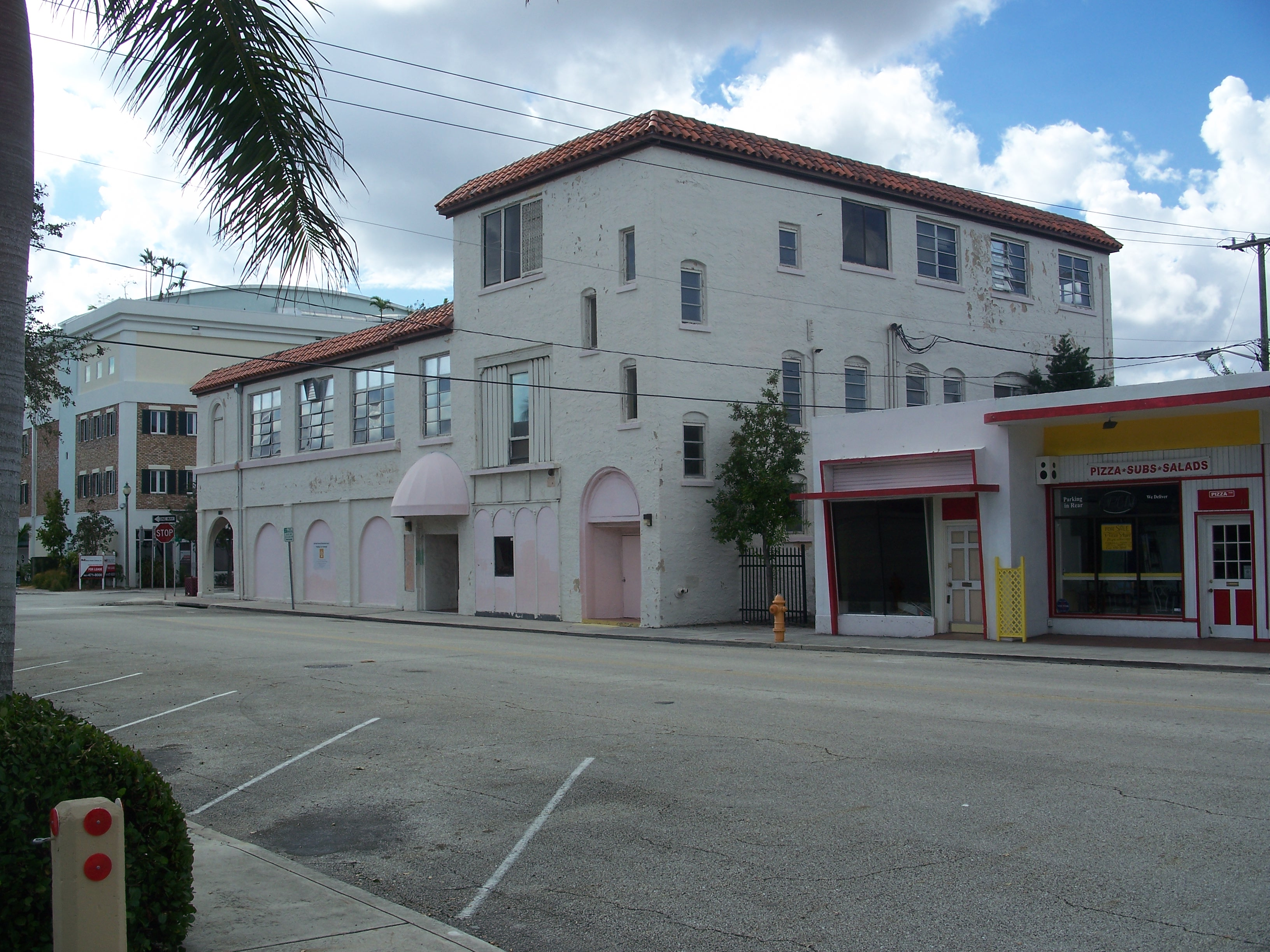

- Location within Florida Location within the United States
- Location: Lake Worth Beach, Florida
- Coordinates: 26°36′56.21″N 80°3′22.95″W
- Area: 16 acres (0.065 km^{2})
- NRHP reference No.: 01001011
- Added to NRHP: September 22, 2001

The Historic Old Town Commercial District (also known as downtown Lake Worth Beach) is a U.S. historic district located in Lake Worth Beach, Florida. The district is bounded by the Florida East Coast Railway, M Street, Lucerne Avenue (Florida State Road 802), and 1st Avenue South, according to the National Register of Historic Places (NRHP), while the city of Lake Worth Beach extends the eastern boundary to Federal Highway (Florida State Road 5). Overall, the district covers approximately 16 acres (6.5 ha) of land.

It contains 46 historic buildings, each constructed between 1912 and 1949 and designed in several architectural styles, including Art Deco, Classical Revival, Mediterranean Revival, and Moorish Revival. Another 13 structures within the district are considered non-contributing due to being built after 1951. Notably, the district includes the historic Lake Worth Playhouse (opened in 1924 as the Oakley Theater) and City Hall, developed in the 1930s as a project of the Works Progress Administration. Due to restoration efforts beginning in the late 1990s, the district now features an array of antique stores, art galleries, historic buildings, sidewalk cafés, and night clubs. Since September 22, 2001, the Historic Old Town Commercial District has been listed on the NRHP.

== Geography ==
The Historic Old Town Commercial District is located in Lake Worth Beach, Florida. According to the National Register of Historic Places registration form, the district covers approximately 16 acres (6.5 ha) of land, spanning westward to the Florida East Coast Railway, eastward to M Street, northward to Lucerne Avenue, and southward to 1st Avenue South. Dixie Highway (also known as U.S. Route 1) runs north-south through the western side of the district. Lucerne Avenue and Lake Avenue, which passes east-west between the former and 1st Avenue South, are both designated as Florida State Road 802. The city of Lake Worth Beach uses slightly different boundaries, with the east end located along Federal Highway (Florida State Road 5).

== History ==
Archaeological evidence from burial mounds indicates the presence of the Jaega in the nearby present-day cities of Boynton Beach, Palm Beach, and South Palm Beach between 750 and 1500 CE. In 1885, Fannie and Samuel James became among the first non-indigenous settlers in modern-day Lake Worth Beach. They owned hundreds of acres of land, including 160 acres (65 ha) south of Lake Avenue (Florida State Road 802) between F and M Streets and 160 acres (65 ha) south of College Park Historic District from Dixie to Federal highways (designated as U.S. Route 1 and Florida State Road 5, respectively). The Palm Beach Farm Company platted and paved residential plots and roads between 1911 and 1912, among them Lake Avenue. In 1913, this settlement would be incorporated as Lake Worth. Around this time, a business district was developed in the vicinity of Dixie Highway and Lake Avenue.

The oldest surviving building in the Historic Old Town Commercial District, located at 609 Lake Avenue, opened in 1912. A frame vernacular structure, the building housed a bicycle shop for several decades. The Carousel Antique Furniture Warehouse, built in 1915, is the only other remaining structure erected before 1920. During the 1920s Florida land boom, dozens of new buildings were constructed in Lake Worth, including the former Scottish Rite Temple at 1000 Lake Avenue in 1921 and the Oakley Theater (now known as the Lake Worth Playhouse) in 1924. Lake Worth's business district was severely impacted by the 1928 Okeechobee hurricane, with approximately 50 businesses destroyed and 200 others damaged – roughly 75% of buildings. After the Great Depression began, construction activity continued due in part to New Deal programs. This included the Works Progress Administration building a municipal auditorium in the 1930s, which later became City Hall.

The widening of Dixie Highway by 32 ft (9.8 m) in the 1970s led to the demolition of several historic buildings within the business district. Restoration efforts in downtown occurred in the late 1990s, with the Florida Department of Transportation spending $3.9 million to improve sidewalks and streets and the city of Lake Worth contributing over $670,000 for benches, landscaping, planters, trash cans, and new lights and sidewalk pavers. Consequently, downtown experienced a resurgence in economic activity, with the area now featuring an array of antique stores, art galleries, historic buildings, sidewalk cafés, and night clubs. On September 22, 2001, the Historic Old Town Commercial District was listed on the National Register of Historic Places.

== Architecture ==
Several architectural building styles are presented in the Historic Old Town Commercial District, including Art Deco, Classical Revival, Craftsman, Frame Vernacular, Masonry Vernacular, Mediterranean Revival, and Moorish Revival. A majority of the structures feature Masonry Vernacular architecture. Most buildings within the district are also one or two stories in height and often abut each other.

== Contributing structures ==
The Historic Old Town Commercial District has 46 structures listed as contributing, including:

Address	Year built	Style	Structure type	Notes
501-503 Lake Avenue	1935	Masonry Vernacular	Commercial	
509 Lake Avenue	1930	Ranch	Commercial	
511 Lake Avenue	1945	Masonry Vernacular	Commercial	
515-517 Lake Avenue	1945	Masonry Vernacular	Commercial	
601 Lake Avenue	1939	Art Deco	Art Museum	Lake Theater building. Later housed an art museum associated with Palm Beach Community College. Current headquarters of the Cultural Council for Palm Beach County
609 Lake Avenue	1912	Frame Vernacular	Commercial	Kerr's Bicycle Shop between 1929 and the 1970s
611-613 Lake Avenue	1945	Masonry Vernacular	Commercial	
615 Lake Avenue	1935	Masonry Vernacular	Commercial	
617-619 Lake Avenue	1923	Masonry Vernacular	Commercial	
621 Lake Avenue	1935	Masonry Vernacular	Commercial	
705 Lake Avenue	1925	Masonry Vernacular	Commercial	Tuesday Gallery
707 Lake Avenue	1923	Masonry Vernacular	Commercial	
708-712 Lake Avenue	1935	Masonry Vernacular	Commercial	
709 Lake Avenue	1925	Masonry Vernacular	Commercial	
713 Lake Avenue	1924	Masonry Vernacular	Theater	Lake Worth Playhouse
716-718 Lake Avenue	1935	Masonry Vernacular	Commercial	
717 Lake Avenue	1930	Masonry Vernacular	Commercial	
720-722 Lake Avenue	1935	Masonry Vernacular	Commercial	
728-730 Lake Avenue	1930	Masonry Vernacular	Hotel	Originally the Rose Apartments, later the Cleve Hotel and Fountain's Department Store
800-802 Lake Avenue	1940	Masonry Vernacular	Commercial	Originally the Lake Worth National Bank
801 Lake Avenue	1920	Mission	Commercial	
803 Lake Avenue	1919	Classical Revival	Commercial	Originally the Bank of Lake Worth
804 Lake Avenue	1940	Masonry Vernacular	Commercial	
805 Lake Avenue	1923	Masonry Vernacular	Commercial	
806 Lake Avenue	1915	Masonry Vernacular	Commercial	Carousel Antique Furniture Warehouse
811 Lake Avenue	1923	Masonry Vernacular	Commercial	Rowe Building
913 Lake Avenue	1949	Masonry Vernacular	Commercial	
915-917 Lake Avenue	1925	Masonry Vernacular	Commercial	
920 Lake Avenue (Note: This address, 920 Lake Avenue, is taken from the Historic Old Town Commercial District's registration form. However, the city of Lake Worth Beach, Florida, lists the current address for the City Hall as 7 North Dixie Highway.)	1933	Moorish Revival	City Hall	Lake Worth Beach City Hall
921 Lake Avenue	1930	Masonry Vernacular	Commercial	
1000 Lake Avenue	1921	Mediterranean Revival	Commercial/Social	Originally the Scottish Rite Temple
1014 Lake Avenue	1940	Masonry Vernacular	Commercial	
625 Lucerne Avenue	1945	Masonry Vernacular	Commercial	
631 Lucerne Avenue	1923	Masonry Vernacular	Hotel	Originally the McCarthy Hotel
701 Lucerne Avenue	1923	Masonry Vernacular	Commercial	
807 Lucerne Avenue	1945	Masonry Vernacular	Commercial	
1013 Lucerne Avenue	1945	Masonry Vernacular	Commercial	
11 North J Street	1935	Masonry Vernacular	Commercial	
9-15 North H Street	1946	Masonry Vernacular	Commercial	
17 North H Street	1924	Masonry Vernacular	Commercial	
8-12 South J Street	1925	Masonry Vernacular	Commercial	
11 South J Street	1924	Masonry Vernacular	Commercial	
17-25 South J Street	1923	Masonry Vernacular	Residence	Thurber Building
32 South J Street	1935	Masonry Vernacular	Commercial	
32A South J Street	1935	Masonry Vernacular	Garage	
35 South J Street	1923	Masonry Vernacular	Commercial	

== Non-contributing and other buildings ==
The National Register of Historic Places (NRHP) registration form classifies 13 structures within the Historic Old Town Commercial District as non-contributing, including: 513, 519, 521-525, 603-605, 701, 702, 706, 807, 809, and 1030 on Lake Avenue; 13 North J Street; and 15 and 27-31 on South J Street. Each of the buildings at the aforementioned addresses are considered non-contributing due to being constructed after 1951.

Because the city of Lake Worth Beach defines the district's eastern boundary at Federal Highway (Florida State Road 5), the local government considers the Old Lake Worth City Hall (also known as the City Hall Annex) to be part of the district. At the federal level, this building has been listed on the NRHP since 1989. The city of Lake Worth Beach also considers the public library building to be a contributing structure, a Mediterranean Revival-style structure erected in 1941. However, the NRHP does not list its address, 15 North M Street, as either a contributing or non-contributing building.
