= College Park Historic District =

College Park Historic District may refer to:

- College Park Historic District (Lake Worth, Florida), listed on the NRHP in Florida
- College Park Historic District (College Park, Georgia), National Register of Historic Places listings in Fulton County, Georgia
- College Park Historic District (Tacoma, Washington), National Register of Historic Places, Washington State Heritage Register
