= Harry & Son =

1984 film by Paul Newman

- Theatrical release poster
- Directed by: Paul Newman
- Screenplay by: Ronald L. Buck; Paul Newman
- Story by: Ronald L. Buck; Paul Newman
- Based on: A Lost King by Raymond DeCapite
- Produced by: Paul Newman; Ronald L. Buck
- Starring: Paul Newman; Robby Benson; Ellen Barkin; Wilford Brimley; Ossie Davis; Joanne Woodward
- Cinematography: Donald McAlpine
- Edited by: Dede Allen
- Music by: Henry Mancini
- Distributed by: Orion Pictures
- Release date: March 2, 1984
- Running time: 117 minutes
- Country: United States
- Language: English
- Budget: $9.5 million
- Box office: $4,864,980

Harry & Son is a 1984 American drama film directed by Paul Newman, who also stars. The screenplay by Newman and Ronald Buck focuses on the relationship between blue-collar worker Harry Keach and his son Howard (Robby Benson), who fails at various odd jobs while aspiring to be a writer. Joanne Woodward, Ellen Barkin, Ossie Davis, Wilford Brimley, and Judith Ivey also star. The film also features Morgan Freeman.

== Plot ==
Widower Harry Keach is a construction worker in South Florida, who was raised to appreciate the importance of working for a living. He takes a dim view of his sensitive son Howard's lackadaisical and sometimes hedonistic lifestyle, in his early 20s and devoted to a dead-end, part-time job, surfing, chasing girls, and hot-tubbing while he dreams of becoming the next Ernest Hemingway. Harry also has a strained relationship with his daughter Nina because he dislikes her husband Andy, an insurance salesman, and he thinks she has become stuck up now that she has married a more affluent man.

When intense headaches and impaired vision cause Harry to lose control of the wrecking ball on his crane, he loses his job. His unemployment leaves him feeling frustrated, although he refuses to work in his brother Tom's military surplus store. Harry becomes increasingly angry at Howard for quitting jobs at a car wash and with an auto repossession outfit and threatens to throw him out of the house.

Harry spends some of his free time visiting his widowed neighbor Lilly Wilowski, a pet store owner who was good friends with his deceased wife Jennifer and has loved Harry for years. Her daughter Katie, a former girlfriend of Howard's with whom he broke up due to rumors of her being promiscuous, is now pregnant with another man's child. After being abandoned by her lover, Katie's relationship with Howard rekindles. He is resisting the advances of a nymphomaniacal older woman, Sally, but eventually introduces her to Harry.

Howard succeeds in selling a short story, much to Harry's amazement. He uses some of the money to finance a vacation for Harry, Lilly, Katie, and her newborn baby (also called Harry). Harry begins to experience happiness at last, until tragedy strikes and he passes away suddenly.

== Cast ==
- Paul Newman as Harry Keach
- Robby Benson as Howard Keach
- Ellen Barkin as Katie Wilowski
- Joanne Woodward as Lilly Wilowski
- Wilford Brimley as Tom Keach
- Judith Ivey as Sally
- Ossie Davis as Raymond
- Morgan Freeman as Siemanowski
- Katherine Borowitz as Nina Keach
- Maury Chaykin as Lawrence
- Robert Goodman as Andy
- Tom Nowicki as Jimmy
- Bunny Yeager as Marina Bar Waitress

== Production ==
Much of the film was shot in Lake Worth, Florida. The movie set construction site was the demolition of the sister hotel affiliated with the Gulf Stream Hotel named The Inn. Stan Barrett was the film's stunt coordinator.

== Reception ==
On Rotten Tomatoes, the film holds an approval rating of 29%, based on 24 reviews, and an average rating of 4.4/10. Vincent Canby of The New York Times called the film "a decently intentioned but rather drab mess of a movie" and added that Paul Newman "has done creditable work as a director before . . . but Harry and Son looks like a first effort, partly because the screenplay has no focus and no particular tone of voice . . . Though the characters use a lot of words that are still taboo on television, the entire project feels as small and dated as a Studio One show of the 1950s."

Roger Ebert of the Chicago Sun-Times rated the film one star and commented, "This movie looks like the aftermath of an explosion in the story department. It's about everything. They give us so many relationships, so many problems, so many emotional hazards, so many colorful characters, we need a battery-lighted ballpoint, so we can take notes in the dark."

Although Time Out London felt the film was "well-acted and elegantly photographed," it thought overall, "It is nothing more than a constant succession of the kind of emotional peaks actors love to do on screen. Humbler scenes involving background or narrative, which may be immensely tedious to act but help the plot unfold, have in general been left out altogether. The result is a curiously indigestible phenomenon, like being forced to eat five courses of avocado by an overbearing dinner-party host."

== Awards ==
Robby Benson's performance in the film earned him a nomination for the Golden Raspberry Award for Worst Supporting Actor at the 5th Golden Raspberry Awards.
