= Lake Worth Playhouse =

The Lake Worth Playhouse, located at 713 Lake Avenue in Lake Worth Beach, Florida, is a venue offering a variety of mainstream and alternative programming, both live and, in its Stonzek Theatre, on film. Built by the brothers Clarence and Lucien Oakley, it opened its doors as the Oakley Theatre in 1924, showing silent movies. It had a Wurlitzer pipe organ, lost in the hurricane of 1928, which virtually demolished the theatre, including its Moorish Deco front. It was rebuilt in a Streamline Moderne style, one of the oldest surviving examples of this architectural style, and reopened in 1929, adding its neon sign, which may be the oldest still in use in the United States in its original location. However, the Great Depression soon left the Oakley brothers in financial trouble, while Lucien died in 1931 and Clarence in 1932.

The theatre changed hands and names several times, and became deteriorated; as the Playtoy, in 1969, it presented the Palm Beach County premiere of Deep Throat. In 1975 the Lake Worth Playhouse (incorporated 1953) purchased the theatre and carried out extensive renovations. It is the oldest surviving Art Deco building in Palm Beach County. It is the host of the annual L-DUB Film Festival. Also a masonry vernacular-type structure, the theater is a contributing building of the Historic Old Town Commercial District, which has been listed on the National Register of Historic Places since September 2001.

== History ==
Clarence and Lucien Oakley, brothers from Illinois, desired to open a movie and vaudeville theater in Florida. After choosing Lake Worth (now known as Lake Worth Beach) for the location of the theater, they purchased a 55 ft (17 m) plot along Lake Avenue. In April 1924, the brothers received a building permit to construct a theater. The Cultural Council of Palm Beach County noted that the brothers did so "on the wave of a movie mania sweeping the country in the early 1920s." Originally expecting to spend about $46,000 on construction, the Oakleys instead expended around $150,000, then considered an astonishing amount of money. Lucien Oakley stated that "no money has been spared to give the people of Lake Worth a theater in keeping with the progressive spirit evidenced here on every hand". On November 3, 1924, the Oakley Theater opened, first screening the silent film Welcome Stranger, starring Noah Beery, Dore Davidson, and Florence Vidor. After operating for nearly four years, the theater was devastated by the 1928 Okeechobee hurricane, suffering "the largest single loss in the city", according to The Palm Beach Post. The roof collapsed and only the stage and some offices withstood the storm. A building permit was issued on October 10, 1928, to repair damages, a project valued at $50,000.

The Oakley Theater reopened on January 10, 1929, as a reinforced steel and concrete building with new seats and a repaired Wurlitzer organ. In October of that year, manager C. P. Malphurs announced that the theater was installing equipment to begin screening sound films, starting on October 13 and 14 with The Broadway Melody, a movie starring Charles King, Bessie Love, and Anita Page. However, the Great Depression soon left the Oakley brothers in financial trouble, leading to Paramount Pictures (then known as Publix Theatres Corporation) acquiring full control of the theater. Lucien then died in 1931 and Clarence in 1932. In 1937, Stanley C. Warrick of Palm Beach became the owner of property, about two years after filing a foreclosure lawsuit that alleged he possessed a lien of just over $34,000 on the theater.

In late 1953, a group of local citizens established the Lake Worth Playhouse. From then through 1975, the organization hosted plays on the third floor of the Old Lake Worth City Hall, but sometimes at the theater department of Palm Beach Junior College (now known as Palm Beach State College), then under the leadership of Watson B. Duncan III. At the latter, Burt Reynolds, then a student of Duncan, performed in several productions. From the 1950s to the mid-1970s, the theater building was known as the Capri Art Theater and later the Playtoy. During this time, the theater incited controversy by showing pornographic films, including Deep Throat, Hedonist Hypnotist, Hot Spur, Many Ways to Sin, Masterpiece, Sweet Trash, The Naked and the Evil, and Tongue Tied. Deep Throat and Hot Spur in particular caused legal trouble, leading to 10 police raids from 1970 to 1973, with 6 copies of Deep Throat confiscated and five employees arrested. At the time, obscenity laws left defendants facing no more than 60 days in jail and fines of $500. The theaters workers were defended by attorneys Joel T. Daves III and Burton Sandler. In November 1973, theater manager William R. Titus was found guilty of misdemeanor obscenity charges relating to showing the movie Deep Throat. One month later, lawyers and prosecutors agreed to a deal mandating that Titus pay a fine and dismissing the charges against the other four employees, but also forcing the Playtoy to shut down.

Dennis Dorsey, a city commissioner and later mayor of Lake Worth, announced in July 1974 that the Lake Worth Playhouse organization expressed interest in purchasing the Playtoy, doing so in October 1975 for $60,000. With assistance from a Bicentennial grant of $15,000, obtained by performing the play The Last of Mrs. Lincoln, the theater was renovated. In September 2001, the Historic Old Town Commercial District was listed on the National Register of Historic Places; the Lake Worth Playhouse is considered a contributing structure. Hurricane Wilma damaged the theater in October 2005, tearing away part of its roof, destroying equipment, flooding dressing rooms, and twisting a stage. The Lake Worth Playhouse celebrated its centennial in 2024 by hosting a Roaring Twenties-style party.

== See also ==
- List of Art Deco architecture in Florida
