= Lake Worth Beach, Florida =

- City
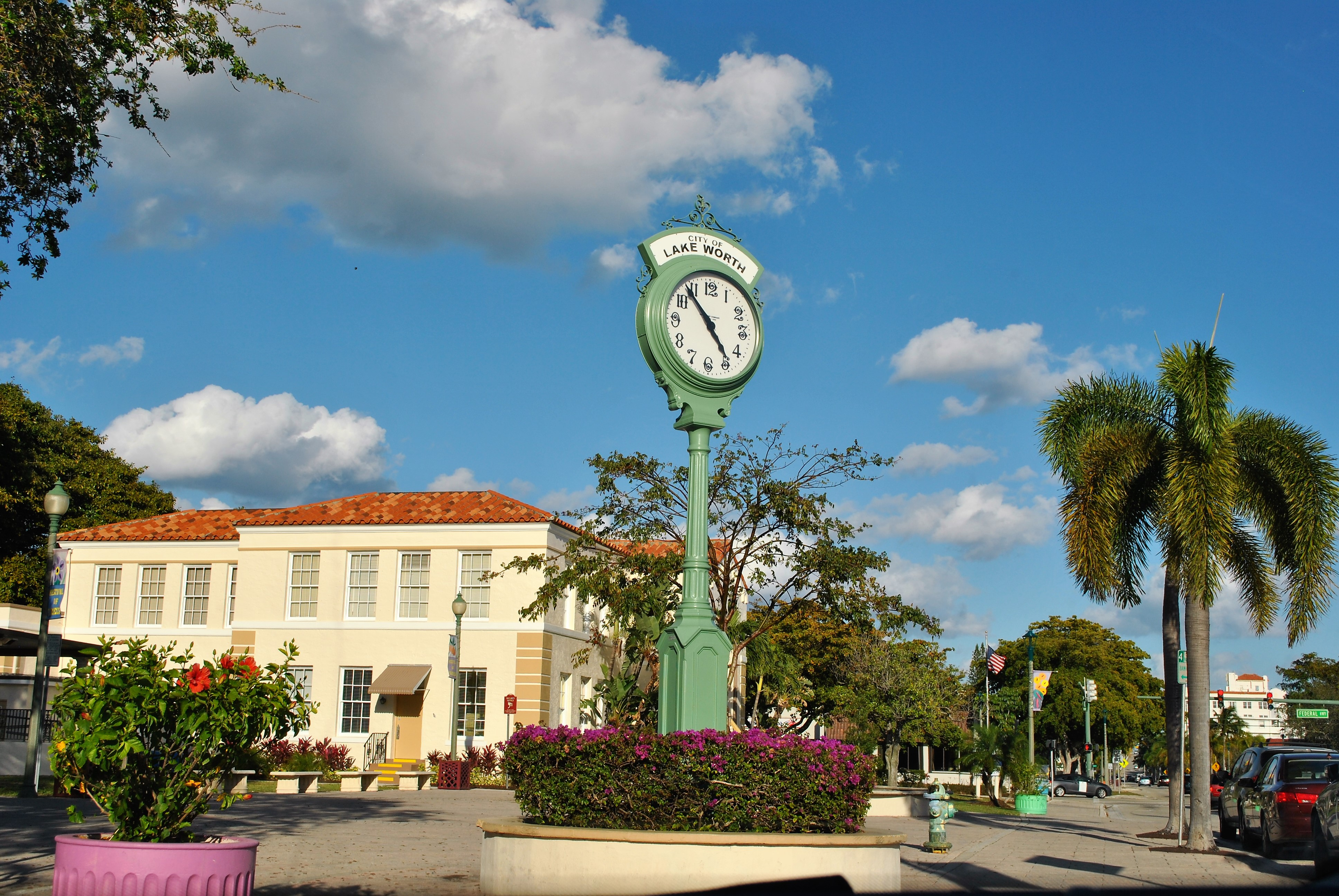
- Downtown Jewel, Lake Worth Beach

- Logo
- Motto(s): "The Art of Florida Living" "Where The Tropics Begin"
- Location of Lake Worth Beach, in Palm Beach County, Florida
- Coordinates: 26°37′36″N 80°03′32″W
- Country: United States
- State: Florida
- County: Palm Beach
- Settled (Jewel Settlement): c. 1885
- Platted (Lucerne): 1911
- Incorporated (Town of Lake Worth): June 14, 1913
- Incorporated (City of Lake Worth): 1925
- Incorporated (City of Lake Worth Beach): March 12, 2019
- Named for: Lake Worth Lagoon and William J. Worth

Government
  - Type: Commission-Manager

Area
  - City: 6.81 sq mi (17.65 km^{2})
  - Land: 5.89 sq mi (15.26 km^{2})
  - Water: 0.92 sq mi (2.38 km^{2}) 13.51%
- Elevation: 16 ft (4.9 m)

Population (2020)
  - City: 42,219
  - Density: 7,164/sq mi (2,766.1/km^{2})
  - Metro: 6,138,333
- Time zone: UTC−5 (EST)
  - Summer (DST): UTC−4 (EDT)
- ZIP codes: 33460, 33461, 33463, 33467
- Area code: 561, 728
- FIPS code: 12-39075
- GNIS feature ID: 2404870
- Website: lakeworthbeachfl.gov

Lake Worth Beach, previously named Lake Worth, is a city in east-central Palm Beach County, Florida, United States, located approximately 63 miles (101 km) north of Miami. The city's name is derived from the body of water along its eastern border known as the Lake Worth Lagoon, which was named for General William J. Worth, who led United States Army forces during the last part of the Second Seminole War. Lake Worth Beach is situated south of West Palm Beach, southeast of Lake Clarke Shores, east of Palm Springs, and north of Lantana, while a small section of the city also partitions the town of Palm Beach. The 2010 census recorded a population of 34,910, which increased to 42,219 in the 2020 census. Lake Worth Beach is within the Miami metropolitan area, which was home to an estimated 6,138,333 people in 2020.

While archaeological evidence indicates that the Jaega inhabited nearby areas thousands of years ago, Samuel and Fannie James, an African American couple, became the first known settlers in modern-day Lake Worth Beach in 1885, filing a homestead claim on 187 acres (76 ha). Fannie James operated the Jewell Post Office from 1889 to 1903 to serve the few residents who lived between Lantana and West Palm Beach. A land development scheme by Bryant & Greenwood in the 1910s allowed buyers to receive a parcel of land if they purchased a lot in present-day Greenacres. Consequently, the population increased from 38 in July 1912 to 308 only five months later. The town of Lake Worth was incorporated in June 1913. Its first elected mayor was James Love, a carpenter and member of the Socialist Party of America. Thereafter, Lake Worth grew rapidly during the 1920s land boom and in the decades following World War II. Residents voted to change the official name to Lake Worth Beach in 2019.

Today, Lake Worth Beach is a city featuring several historic neighborhoods, such as the National Register of Historic Places-listed College Park and Old Lucerne, while the downtown area also has dozens of buildings that are part of the Historic Old Town Commercial District. Lake Worth Beach is one of the most ethnically and racially diverse municipalities in Palm Beach County, with a large working class population compared to other coastal cities in Palm Beach County. Several cultural events are hosted annually in the city, including a street painting festival, several ethnic festivals, and Palm Beach Pride, one of the largest LGBTQIA+ pride festivals in Florida.

== History ==
=== Prior to incorporation ===
Native Americans migrated into Florida beginning about 12,000 years ago. While evidence near the town of Jupiter indicates local inhabitation dating back to the Paleo-Indian period, the Jaega were the first known tribe to have resided along the Florida Atlantic coast in the areas of Martin and Palm Beach counties. The remains of shell mounds sites, mostly dating back to approximately 750–1500 CE, attest to pre-Columbian Jaega inhabitation near Lake Worth Beach, including in Boynton Beach, Palm Beach, and South Palm Beach.

Among the city's first non-indigenous settlers were Samuel and Fannie James. The Jameses were an African American couple reported to be ex-slaves, known as the Black Diamonds, who settled on the shores of the Lake Worth Lagoon near the current 5th Avenue South in 1885. A stone monument dedicated to Samuel and Fannie James at the northwest corner of Lucerne Avenue (State Road 802) and J Street inaccurately uses the date 1883, due to a transcription error. The couple made a claim for their land under the Homestead Act in 1885. Their holdings, originally 187 acres (76 ha), increased over time to more than 700 acres (280 ha), including 160 acres (65 ha) of homestead land south of Lake Avenue (State Road 802) between M and F Streets; 163.3 acres (66.1 ha) in modern-day College Park, acquired from the estate of William Stephan, where Fannie ran a pineapple farm; and 160 acres (65 ha) to the south between the current Dixie and Federal highways (Route 1 and State Road 5), acquired from Swedish immigrants Olai and Sarah Gudmundsen.

The initial name of the area's first post office was Jewel (sometimes spelled Jewell), which served the few residences between Lantana and West Palm Beach. Between 1889 and 1903, Fannie James served as postmaster of the post office, located in a small dry goods shop, which the couple operated to serve the lake traffic that connected the small pioneer homesteads located along the banks of the Lake Worth Lagoon.

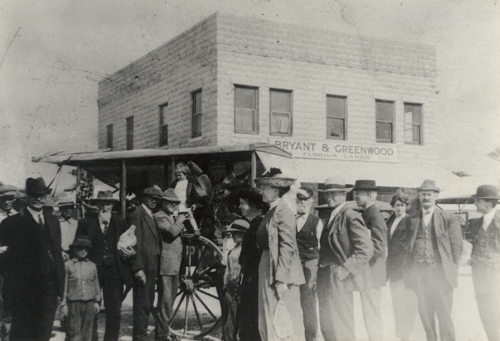
The office of Bryant & Greenwood along Lake Avenue (c. 1912)

Beginning in the 1890s, the Jameses sold off most of their acreage in a number of parcels ranging in size from 5 to 20 acres (2.0 to 8.1 ha) to new residents and investors. After Samuel's death in 1909, Fannie sold her remaining 156 acres (63 ha) to the developer, Palm Beach Farms Company, keeping only a 1.25 acre (0.51 ha) farmette, which lay outside the new city limits as required by the segregation provisions of the 1913 town of Lake Worth charter.

After Henry Flagler extended the Florida East Coast Railway (FEC) south from West Palm Beach to Miami in 1896, a land development scheme was created to plant a townsite between the railroad and the lake. Purchasers of agricultural lots, most of which were located in modern-day Greenacres, would also receive a small 25 by 25 ft (7.6 by 7.6 m) lot within the city of Lake Worth. The developer, Bryant & Greenwood, promoted the area to markets across the United States and Canada. They proposed to name the town Lucerne, but the United States Postal Service refused to accept the name because there already was a Lucerne post office, now a neighborhood in Miami Gardens. Therefore, the city founders changed the new town's name to Lake Worth.

In April 1911, "A solitary Indian mound surrounded by wild woods marked the spot where flourishing Lake Worth is now growing beyond the most vivid imagination", according to a promotional article published in the Lake Worth Herald. The population of the nascent city stood at 38 in July 1912.

During that year, the library, schoolhouse, newspaper, Women's Club, Chamber of Commerce, first church, and first railroad station (operated by the FEC at Lake Avenue) were established. The town's first census in December 1912 indicated that there were "308 residents, 125 houses, 10 wagons, seven automobiles, 36 bicycles and 876 fowls." Additionally, from 1911 to 1912, the Palm Beach Farms Company platted approximately 7,000 residential lots and constructed some 55 mi (89 km) of roads, including Lake Avenue, a major thoroughfare.

=== Incorporation to the Great Depression ===
Lake Worth Beach was incorporated as the "town of Lake Worth" on June 14, 1913. Its first elected Mayor was James Love, a carpenter and member of the Socialist Party of America. The town grew rapidly enough that a new addition was platted in that inaugural year. The area along the Intracoastal Waterway from 5th Avenue South to 15th Avenue South still bears the name Addition 1. An advertisement in the Lake Worth Herald in 1913 noted: "In the new addition, the Lake front has been divided into large lots covered with palm and tropical growth, where we expect to see charming villas and winter homes spring up as by enchantment. It will be the fashionable part of town, where the wealthy of the earth can display their artistic taste and make ideal homes. These lots are selling so fast that but very few are left." Another section of the town was plotted in 1917, the Osborne Colored Addition, a small African American neighborhood along the south end of Lake Worth and west of the FEC. Some of the first African American families arrived in the addition in the early 1920s, when the Ku Klux Klan forced them out of western Lantana.

Two years after the addition was platted, a wooden automobile traffic bridge over Lake Worth was completed in 1919, the same year the Brelsford family of Palm Beach deeded a 1,000 ft (300 m) parcel of land on the barrier island to the town.

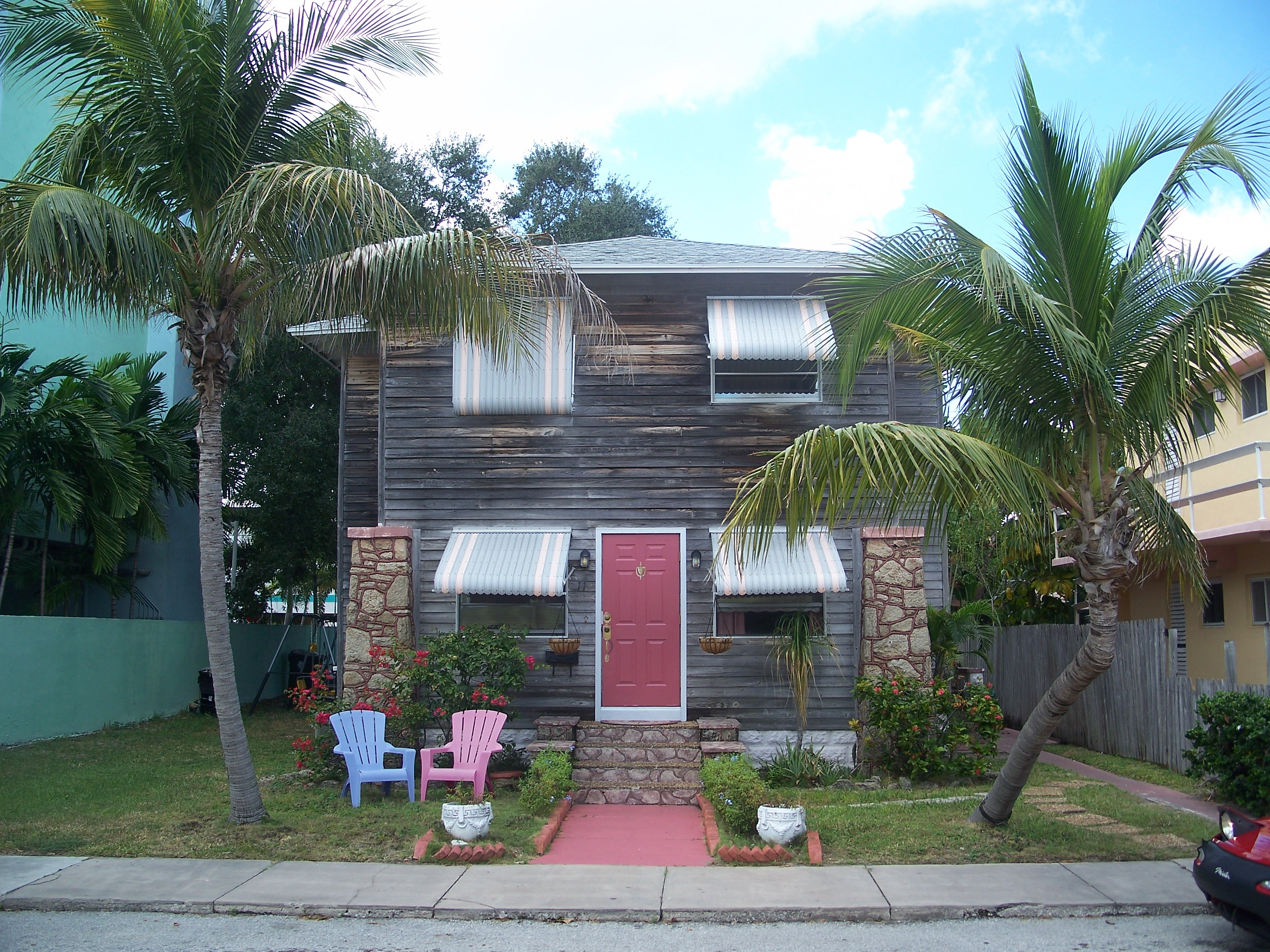
A house (built in 1923) in the Old Lucerne Historic Residential District

The town benefited with the rest of South Florida during the Florida land boom of the 1920s, with Lake Worth's population more than quintupling from 1,106 in 1920 to nearly 6,000 in 1930. Following the approval of a $100,000 bond issue in 1920, the Mediterranean Revival-style Lake Worth Casino and Baths was constructed. Opening two years later, the casino drew many tourists to the area.

Moreover, the 1920s saw the completion of the Gulf Stream Hotel, which is listed on the National Register of Historic Places (NRHP), as well as the construction of Lake Worth Community High School in 1922 and many commercial and industrial buildings and neighborhoods, including College Park and Lake Worth Heights in 1924. Lake Worth reincorporated as a city in 1925, while boundaries of the municipality expanded several times throughout the land boom. One year later, the Seaboard Air Line Railway constructed a freight and passenger depot in Lake Worth on 4th Avenue North.

William A. Boutwell arrived in the area in the 1920s. He established Boutwell Dairy in 1927 and managed the company until retiring in 1956. Boutwell is credited with inventing half & half creamer; the dairy later merged with Alfar Creamery and then T.G. Lee, who distributed the product more widely until it became an American diner staple. Boutwell also owned a grocery store and masonry supply store. Furthermore, he served as a Lake Worth city commissioner from 1924 to 1927 and briefly as vice mayor. During his tenure, the city constructed approximately 36 mi (58 km) of roads and two elementary schools, including the still active South Grade Elementary School.

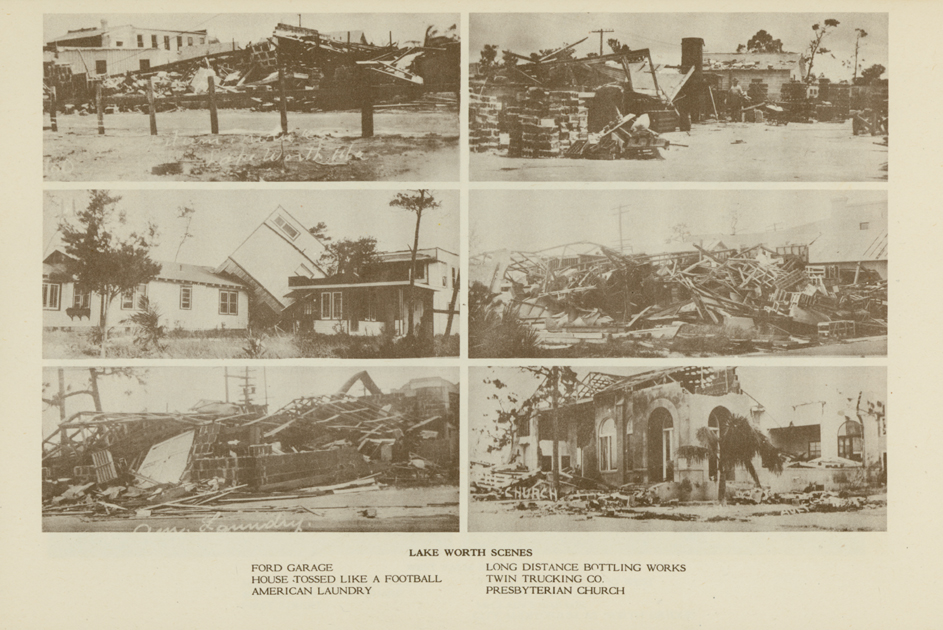
Scenes of devastation from the 1928 hurricane in Lake Worth

The 1928 Okeechobee hurricane devastated Lake Worth. A survey indicated that the storm demolished about 600 homes and damaged 1,500 others, leaving about 700 people homeless. Fewer than 10% of homes escaped damage. Approximately 50 businesses were wrecked and 200 others received damage – roughly 75% of buildings in the business district. The storm demolished or severely damaged many buildings, including First Presbyterian Church, St. Andrew's Episcopal Church, the Oakley Theater, the Gulf Stream Hotel, the Scottish Rites Cathedral, the Masonic Temple, the Florida Hotel, a car dealership, a sporting goods store, an investment company, the Old Lake Worth City Hall, and an auditorium at Lake Worth Community High School. Additionally, the bridge across the Intracoastal Waterway was virtually destroyed. The hurricane caused approximately $4 million worth of damages in Lake Worth, as well as three deaths.

In the immediate aftermath of the storm, the Gulf Stream Hotel was converted to a makeshift hospital. The devastation left Lake Worth without a functional center for city government, although records were mostly unscathed. Consequently, a temporary city hall was established at the Lauriston building. The storm, combined with the Great Depression led to a severe economic decline within the community. Construction projects primarily shifted to repairing damaged buildings. However, there were a few conservation, construction, and New Deal projects during the 1930s. This included when President Franklin D. Roosevelt's Works Progress Administration built the striking, Moorish-styled "city gymnasium" on the corner of Lake Avenue and Dixie Highway. The building today serves as the Lake Worth Beach City Hall.

=== World War II to present ===
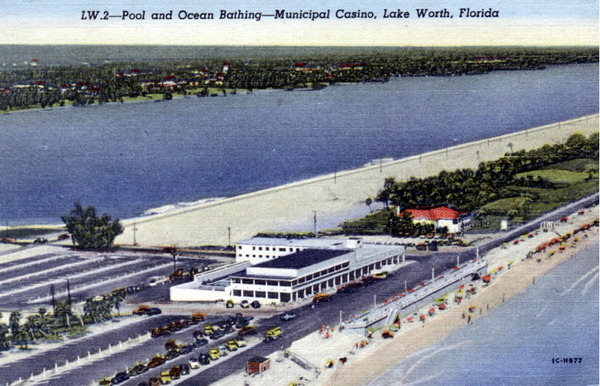
A postcard (c. 1953) showing the shoebox-style Lake Worth Casino built following the 1947 hurricane

Although no military installations were located in Lake Worth, the presence of military bases and repair facilities in nearby towns led to a significant increase in the city's population during World War II, from 7,406 in 1940 to 10,615 about five years later. Development started again after World War II, especially due to the approval of the G.I. Bill, allowing new homes to become affordable. Many veterans who trained in South Florida also returned to the area, leading to a population boom. The city also saw a wave of immigrants, especially from Finland. These Finnish immigrants established three churches in Lake Worth to preserve their heritage while also benefiting the local economy, which returned to a state of stability in the post-war years.

Two hurricanes impacted Lake Worth later in the 1940s, one in 1947 and the other in 1949. Although the former damaged nearly all businesses and about half of homes, few structures suffered serious damage. However, among the structures experiencing substantial impact was the Lake Worth Casino, which was repaired and reopened in the 1950s with a shoebox style architectural design. Although the 1949 hurricane made landfall in Lake Worth, the cyclone caused less impact than the 1947 storm. Around 300–400 homes were damaged, with one destroyed, while the storm deroofed many homes in the Osborne Colored Addition. Winds also destroyed a filling station and shattered many windows at downtown businesses.

In 1954, a concrete wall was erected at the Osborne Colored Addition to separate it from the white Whispering Palms neighborhood. Although the city officially integrated in 1969, the neighborhood retained the name Osborne Colored Addition until 1994. Today, the remnants of the wall is referred to as the Unity Wall and is instead used for murals. Despite the Brown vs. Board of Education decision by the Supreme Court of the United States in 1954, Palm Beach County schools only slowly integrated. John Green and Theresa Jakes Kanu became among the first black students to attend a formerly whites-only high school in Palm Beach County when they arrived at Lake Worth High Community High School in 1961. Little further progress on the racial integration of schools in the county occurred until a court order in 1970.

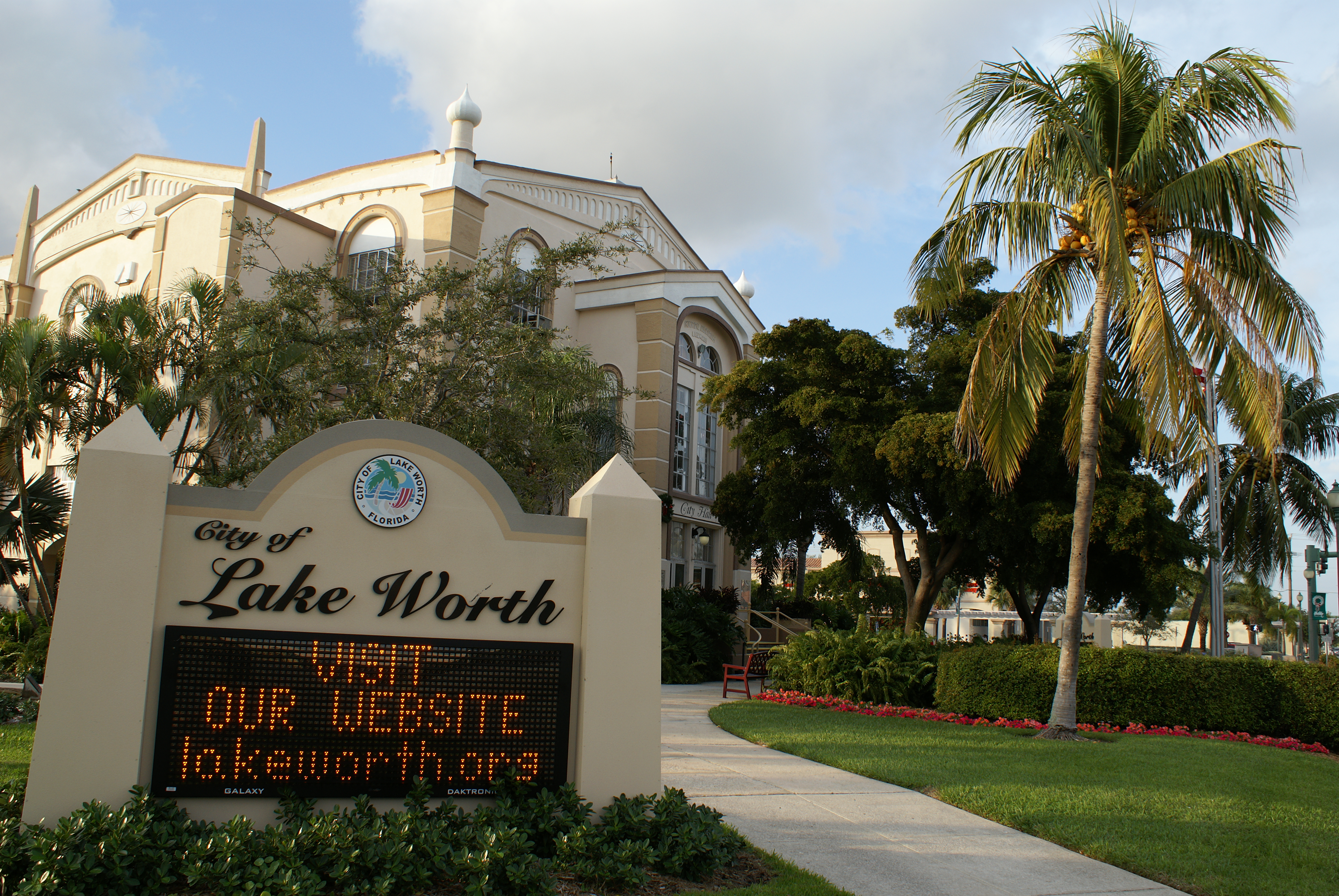
The building that has served as the Lake Worth City Hall since the 1970s

The 1960s and 1970s also brought the construction of many apartments, condominiums, and larger commercial buildings, which often resulted in the demolition of older structures. During a period of neglect and decline between the 1970s and 1990s, Lake Worth, in the words of then-city commissioner Dennis Dorsey, "had become known as the skin-flick capital of the country". The venue now known as the Lake Worth Playhouse was the Playtoy, and was well known in Palm Beach County as the theater that showed X-rated movies; Deep Throat was shown there, motivating a police raid in the 1970s. The decade also saw the construction of the current bridge across the Intracoastal Waterway. Opening in 1973, the Robert A. Harris Bridge is two lanes wider and higher than the previous bridge, built in 1938. Also during 1973, the Lake Worth City Hall moved from 414 Lake Avenue to 7 North Dixie Highway, its current location. The building at the former address has been listed in the NRHP since 1989 and is also often referred to as City Hall Annex.

Foreign political turmoil and the South Florida construction boom have brought another wave of immigrants from Central America and the Caribbean, especially since the 1980s. Included in the immigration wave of that decade were many Guatemalan-Mayans, who consider themselves indigenous people rather than "Hispanic" or "Latino", and some may not speak Spanish. Many Guatemalan-Maya people migrated to Lake Worth Beach to seek refuge from the Guatemalan genocide being committed against the indigenous Maya people in Guatemala, often referred to as the Silent Holocaust. The Maya mostly converse in Mam, Q'anjob'al, or any one of 22 existing Mayan languages spoken in Guatemala. Adding to the racial and linguistic mix of the city is a large Haitian population, many of whom speak Creole. Most immigrants from Haiti have also arrived in the United States since the early 1980s.

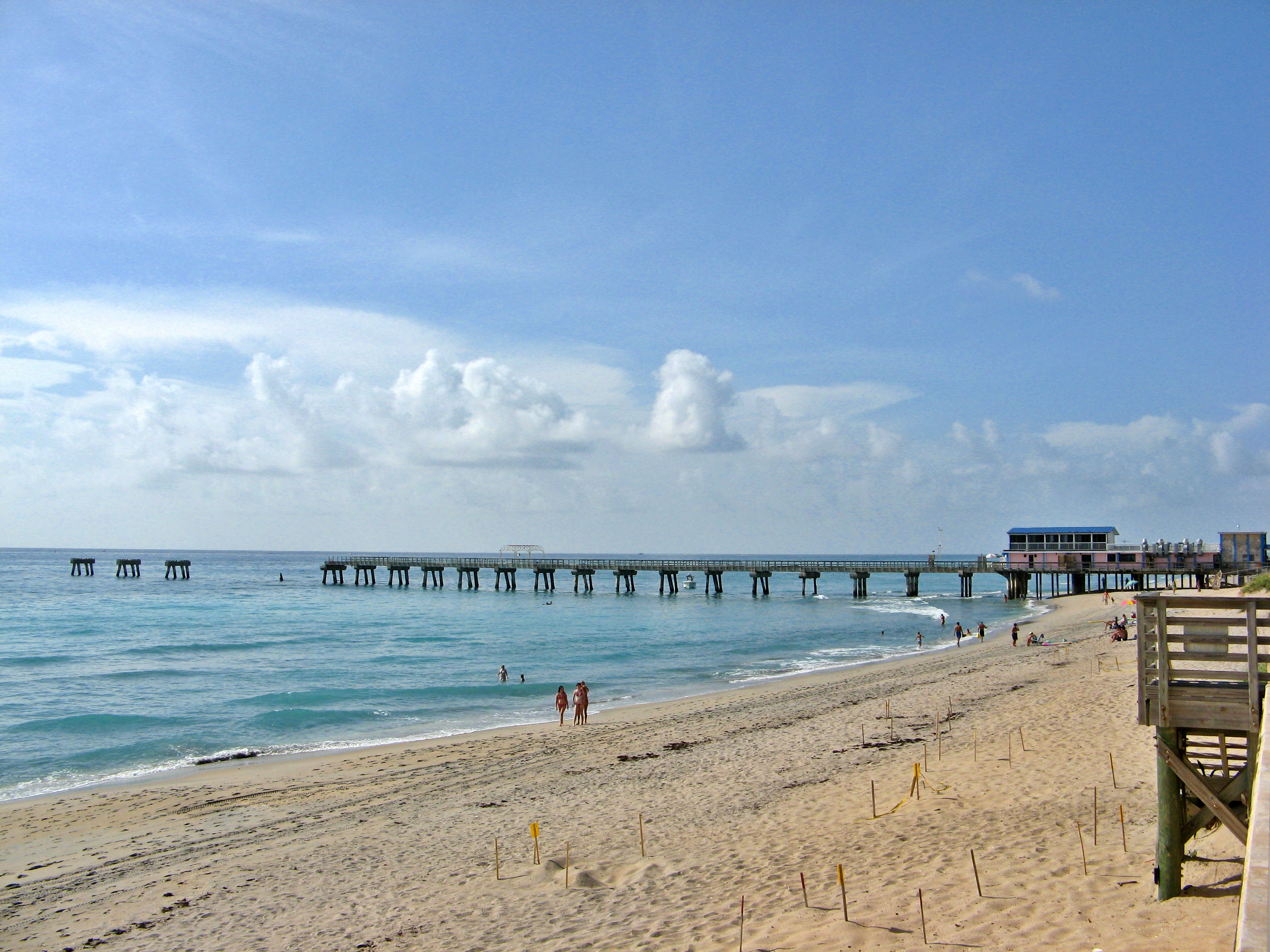
The Lake Worth Pier, damaged by hurricanes Frances and Jeanne in 2004

The downtown area underwent restoration efforts in the late 1990s. The Florida Department of Transportation spent $3.9 million to improve sidewalks and streets, while the city of Lake Worth contributed over $670,000 for benches, landscaping, planters, trash cans, and new lights and sidewalk pavers. As a result, downtown property values increased in 1997 for the first time since the late 1980s. The area then saw a huge resurgence in interest and now sports an array of art galleries, sidewalk cafés, and night clubs. The city's main street, Lake Avenue, contains some of the oldest commercial structures in South Florida. Lake Avenue, along with the parallel street of Lucerne Avenue, include most of the structures constituting the Historic Old Town Commercial District, which has been listed in the NRHP since 2001.

Later in the 2000s decade, the city was hit especially hard by hurricanes Frances and Jeanne in 2004 and Wilma in 2005. Wilma alone destroyed 27 homes and 7 businesses and damaged 2,491 homes and 93 businesses to some degree. Damage to businesses, government properties, and residences combined from Wilma totaled approximately $28.3 million. The William O. Lockhart Municipal Pier, constructed in 1954, suffered significant damage from the hurricanes, especially due to Frances and Jeanne, requiring $3.4 million to be repaired. The pier is home to a tide gauge with a sporadic history, showing an above average rate of sea level rise.

In 2015, the city was accused of asking for business licenses from surrounding churches. Then-City Manager Michael Bornstein described the controversy as a "dust-up" that became politicized, while the accuser, Pastor Mike Olive of Common Ground Church, later stated that the "problems are behind us now."

A ballot initiative to change the name of the city to Lake Worth Beach in 2019, passed by a narrow margin. The city stated that the name change "will be implemented slowly". One of the main reasons cited for the proposal was to distinguish the city from its suburbs to the west, which have a reputation for higher crime rates. Another factor motivating support for the name change was that tourism could increase as the city would have an opportunity to rebrand itself as a beach town.

The city government became embroiled in another controversy that garnered national headlines in March 2020. Then-Mayor Pam Triolo and then-Lake Worth Beach Commissioner Omari Hardy became involved in a heated discussion over the potential for shutting off electrical services due to non-payment in the midst of the COVID-19 pandemic lockdowns. In response, the city government allowed electrical service to residents to remain uninterrupted for the next few months, with or without payment, before city commissioners unanimously voted to resume power shutoffs in July 2020.

== Geography ==
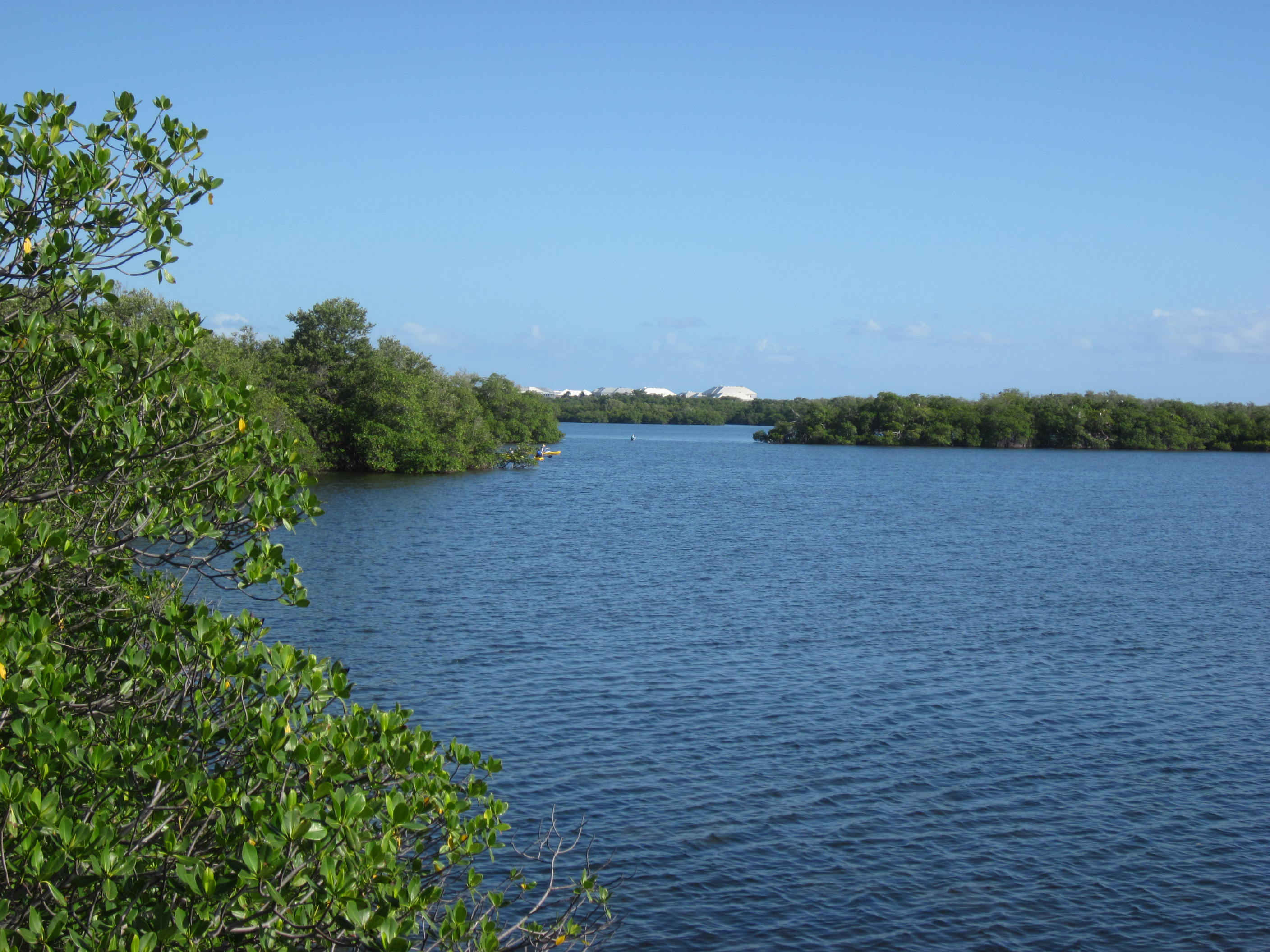
Lake Worth Lagoon

According to the United States Census Bureau, the city has a total area of 6.81 square miles (18 km^{2}), of which 5.89 square miles (15 km^{2}) is land and 0.92 square miles (2 km^{2}) (13.51%) is water.

Several geographical features in Palm Beach County somewhat confusingly share the name "Lake Worth." The city of Lake Worth Beach is named after a lagoon which is officially known as the Lake Worth Lagoon. This lagoon opens to the Atlantic Ocean at the Port of Palm Beach via the Lake Worth Inlet. The next closest inlet exists farther south in Boynton Beach. The port and two inlets are all distant from the actual city of Lake Worth Beach. The lake is a long channel that spans much of east-central and northeastern Palm Beach County; indeed, the Intracoastal Waterway traverses the length of the lagoon. The manmade inlets to the ocean have replaced the natural freshwater with saltwater, such that the lagoon is actually now an estuary, instead of a true lagoon.

The U.S. Department of Agriculture has mapped most of Lake Worth Beach in the Southern Florida Flatwoods land resource area. Deep, poorly drained acidic sandy soils are typical for the area; they have gray topsoil, white subsoil, and a dark hardpan. Much of Lake Worth Beach is built on a rapidly drained white or gray sand which is too dry and infertile to support vigorous plant growth. The western outskirts of Lake Worth Beach are in the Southern Florida Lowlands area. Topsoils there are sandy, but the subsoils have a much higher content of clay and the soils are relatively fertile. As in the flatwoods, these soils are poorly drained for many purposes unless drainage systems are installed.

Although the incorporated city of Lake Worth Beach is small geographically, as is common in Palm Beach County, a large unincorporated urbanized area with a Lake Worth postal address lies to the west of the city. Only two zip codes are within the city's boundaries, 33460 and the eastern edge of 33641, while 33449, the remainder of 33461, 33462, 33463, and 33467 zip codes are located outside the city limits but may use a Lake Worth mailing address. Thus, The Palm Beach Post noted in 2019 that there are more mailing addresses for Lake Worth (unincorporated area) than Lake Worth Beach (the proper, incorporated area).

=== Climate ===
Lake Worth Beach has a tropical climate, similar to the climate found in much of the Caribbean. It is part of the only region in the 48 contiguous states that falls under that category. More specifically, it generally has a tropical monsoon climate (Köppen climate classification, Am).

=== Cityscape and neighborhoods ===
The Lake Worth Beach Community Redevelopment Agency (CRA) maintains the Neighborhood Association President's Council (NAPC). The three purposes of the NAPC, according to the Lake Worth Beach CRA, is to improve representation of diversity in the city's neighborhoods, to maintain open communications between city government and neighborhood associations, and to promote volunteering to assist needy areas.

A total of 17 neighborhood associations are recognized by the Lake Worth Beach CRA, including:

- Bryant Park, bounded by the Intracoastal Waterway to the east, Lucerne Avenue to the north, South Federal Highway to the west, and 5th Avenue South to the south; also includes the Lake Worth Municipal Beach
- College Park, bounded by the Intracoastal Waterway to the east, West Palm Beach to its north, Dixie Highway to the west, and Wellesley Drive to the south
- Downtown Jewel (Downtown Lake Worth Beach), bounded by South Federal Highway to the east, Lucerne Avenue to the north, South Dixie Highway to the west, and 6th Avenue South to the south, and has Old Town within its border
- Eden Place, bounded by the Intracoastal Waterway to the east, Wellesley Drive to the north, Dixie Highway to the west, and 13th Avenue North to the south
- Lake Cove, near the northwest corner of Lake Worth Beach
- Mango Groves, bounded by North Federal Highway to the east, 13th Avenue North to the north, North Dixie Highway to the west, and Lucerne Avenue to the south
- Memorial Park, bounded by South Dixie Highway to the east, 6th Avenue to the north, Interstate 95 to the west, and 12th Avenue South to the south
- Murray Hills, bordering Lake Osborne along Cynthia Lane
- Parrot Cove (Old Lucerne), bounded by Lake Worth Beach Golf Club to the east, 13th Avenue North to the north, North Federal Highway to the west, and Lucerne Avenue to the south
- Pineapple Beach, South Federal Highway to the east, 6th Avenue North to the north, South Dixie Highway to the west, and Lantana to the south
- ROLO (Residences on Lake Osborne), includes all areas west of Interstate 95 sans Murray Hills neighborhood
- Royal Poinciana, bounded by South Dixie Highway to the east, Lucerne Avenue to the north, Interstate 95 to the west, and 6th Avenue South to the south
- South Palm Park, bounded by the Intracoastal Waterway to the east, 5th Avenue South to the north, South Federal Highway to the west, and Lantana to the south
- Sunset Ridge, bounded by North Dixie Highway to the east, West Palm Beach to the north, Lake Clarke Shores to the west, and 10th Avenue North to the south
- Tropical Ridge, bounded by North Dixie Highway to the east, 10th Avenue North to the north, Interstate 95 to the west, and Lucerne Avenue to the south
- Vernon Heights, located near the northwest corner of Lake Worth Beach
- Whispering Palms, bounded by South Dixie Highway to the east, 12th Avenue South to the north, Interstate 95 to the west, and Lantana to the south

The College Park and Old Lucerne (Parrot Cove) neighborhoods are notable for being historic districts listed in the National Register of Historic Places (NRHP). The former is a neighborhood in which most of the homes were constructed 1925 and 1949. Of the 123 residences in College Park, 90 residences are classified as contributing and the remaining 33 others classified as non-contributing, with a majority of those constructed after 1949. The Old Lucerne Historic Residential District is the section of Lake Worth Beach where Samuel and Fannie James lived. A total of 346 structures are located in the district, with 218 classified as contributing and 128 are classified as non-contributing. The contributing structures were constructed from as early as about 1913 to 1951.

==== Downtown ====
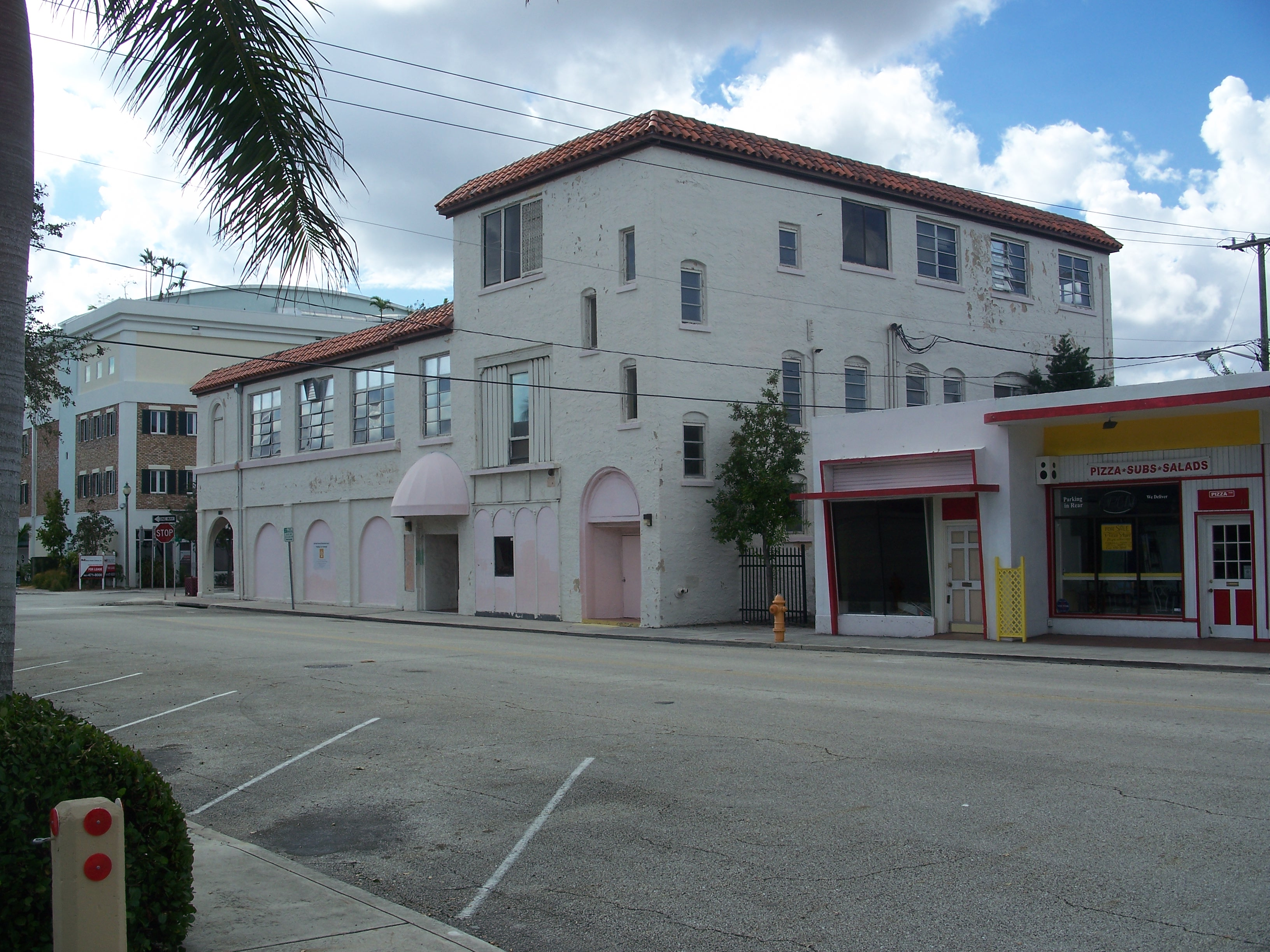
A few buildings in the downtown area

The Historic Old Town Commercial District, listed in the NRHP in 2001, encompasses much of downtown Lake Worth Beach. A total of 59 buildings are part of the roughly 16-acre (6.5 ha) area, which stretches westward to the Florida East Coast Railroad (adjacent to G Street), eastward to M Street, northward to Lucerne Avenue, and southward to 1st Avenue South. It is distinguished by its two main streets, the east-to-west Lake Avenue and Lucerne Avenue, while Dixie Highway is a major north-south thoroughfare through the district. Of the 59 structures listed as part of the historic commercial district, 46 are classified as contributing and the other 13 are considered non-contributing. The contributing buildings, constructed between 1912 and 1949, are generally of Masonry Vernacular-style architecture, although Art Deco, Mediterranean Revival, and Moorish Revival styles are also present.

Lake Worth Beach's downtown area has a distinct character and is a popular destination for both tourists and residents of South Florida. Several of the city's notable buildings are located in this section, including the current City Hall, former City Hall (NRHP-listed in 1989 and includes the Lake Worth Historical Museum), Lake Worth Beach Post Office, Lake Worth Playhouse, Lake Worth Beach Public Library, and Park Theater, although not all of these structures are listed as part of the Historic Old Town Commercial District.

== Demographics ==
Historical population
Census	Pop.	Note	%±
1920	1,106		—
1930	5,940		437.1%
1940	7,408		24.7%
1950	11,777		59.0%
1960	20,758		76.3%
1970	23,714		14.2%
1980	27,048		14.1%
1990	28,564		5.6%
2000	35,133		23.0%
2010	34,910		−0.6%
2020	42,219		20.9%
U.S. Decennial Census

In terms of population, Lake Worth Beach ranked as the ninth largest city in Palm Beach County according to the 2020 census. Lake Worth Beach is considered one of the most ethnically and racially diverse cities in Palm Beach County. Less than a majority of residents identify as non-Hispanic white, while Hispanic whites represented a plurality of the population in 2019. Additionally, as of 2021, approximately 38.7% of residents were born outside of the United States, many of whom immigrated from the Caribbean or Latin America, and just 44.9% of people in Lake Worth Beach only spoke English.

=== Racial and ethnic composition ===
Lake Worth city, Florida – Racial and ethnic composition Note: the US Census treats Hispanic/Latino as an ethnic category. This table excludes Latinos from the racial categories and assigns them to a separate category. Hispanics/Latinos may be of any race.
Race / Ethnicity (NH = Non-Hispanic)	Pop 2000	Pop 2010	Pop 2020	% 2000	% 2010	% 2020
White alone (NH)	16,884	13,291	13,275	48.06%	38.07%	31.44%
Black or African American alone (NH)	6,320	6,603	7,786	17.99%	18.91%	18.44%
Native American or Alaska Native alone (NH)	89	322	73	0.25%	0.92%	0.17%
Asian alone (NH)	253	308	408	0.72%	0.88%	0.97%
Native Hawaiian or Pacific Islander alone (NH)	25	22	22	0.07%	0.06%	0.05%
Other race alone (NH)	108	71	251	0.31%	0.20%	0.59%
Mixed race or Multiracial (NH)	1,017	459	1,047	2.89%	1.31%	2.48%
Hispanic or Latino (any race)	10,437	13,834	19,357	29.71%	39.63%	45.85%
Total	35,133	34,910	42,219	100.00%	100.00%	100.00%

=== 2020 census ===
As of the 2020 census, Lake Worth Beach had a population of 42,219. The median age was 35.7 years. 23.5% of residents were under the age of 18 and 13.0% of residents were 65 years of age or older. Adults 18 and over comprised 76.5% of the population.

100.0% of residents lived in urban areas, while 0.0% lived in rural areas.

There were 15,457 households in Lake Worth Beach, of which 31.7% had children under the age of 18 living in them. Of all households, 32.0% were married-couple households, 28.1% were households with a male householder and no spouse or partner present, and 29.6% were households with a female householder and no spouse or partner present. About 31.9% of all households were made up of individuals and 11.4% had someone living alone who was 65 years of age or older.

There were 17,476 housing units, of which 11.6% were vacant. The homeowner vacancy rate was 2.3% and the rental vacancy rate was 6.9%. The population density was 7,164.26 inhabitants per square mile (2,766.10/km^{2}), and housing units averaged 2,564.90 inhabitants per square mile (990.31/km^{2}).

Racial composition as of the 2020 census
Race	Number	Percent
White	16,480	39.0%
Black or African American	8,060	19.1%
American Indian and Alaska Native	2,451	5.8%
Asian	417	1.0%
Native Hawaiian and Other Pacific Islander	28	0.1%
Some other race	8,046	19.1%
Two or more races	6,737	16.0%

=== Income and poverty ===
As of 2019, the median household income in Lake Worth Beach is $42,500. This is significantly lower than the county and statewide medians from 2015–2019, which was $63,299 and $55,660, respectively. In 2019, an estimated 24.4% of residents were considered impoverished, more than twice the countywide average of 12.0% and nearly double the Florida average of 12.4%.

=== 2010 census ===
As of the 2010 United States census, there were 34,910 people, 12,466 households, and 6,744 families residing in the city. The population density was 5,945.2 inhabitants per square mile (1,979.26/km^{2}). The 16,473 housing units averaged 2,418.94 inhabitants per square mile (933.95/km^{2}).

As of 2010, in the city, the age distribution was 5.2% at 65 or older, 22.2% was under 18, 17.0% from 18 to 24, 31.1% from 25 to 44, and 24.5% from 45 to 64; the median age was 35. years. For every 117 males, there were 100 females. For every 100 females age 18 and over, there were 121 males. Around 30.1% of the households in 2010 had children under the age of 18 living with them, 11.7% were married couples living together, 13.1% had a female householder with no spouse present, and 46.2% were not families. About 33.1% of all households were made up of one individual, and 22.1% had someone living alone who was 65 years of age or older. The average household size was 2.65, and the average family size was 3.37.

=== 2000 census ===
As of the census of 2000, there were 35,133 people, 13,828 households, and 7,688 families residing in the city. The population density was 6,225.5/mi² (2,405.1/km²). There were 15,861 housing units at an average density of 2,810.6/mi² (1,085.8/km²). The racial makeup of the city was 65.12% White (48.1% were Non-Hispanic White), 18.86% African American, 0.78% Native American, 0.75% Asian, 0.11% Pacific Islander, 9.57% from other races, and 4.82% from two or more races. Hispanic or Latino of any race were 29.71% of the population.

In 2000, the age distribution of the population was spread out in 2000, with 22.9% under the age of 18, 10.6% from 18 to 24, 32.6% from 25 to 44, 19.6% from 45 to 64, and 14.3% who were 65 years of age or older. The median age was 35 years. For every 100 females there were 108.9 males. For every 100 females age 18 and over, there were 110.2 males. For every 100 females age 18 and over, there were 112 males.

In 2000, 26.0% had children under the age of 18 living with them, 36.9% were married couples living together, 11.5% had a female householder with no spouse present, and 44.4% were non-families. Approximately 33.6% of all households were made up of one individual, and 11.4% had someone living alone who was 65 years of age or older. The average household size was 2.49 and the average family size was 3.19.

In 2000, the median income for a household in the city was $30,034, and the median income for a family was $35,374. Males had a median income of $24,862 versus $22,971 for females. The per capita income for the city was $15,517. About 15.8% of families and 20.0% of the population were below the poverty line, including 24.1% of those under age 18 and 12.7% of those age 65 or over.

As of 2000, the three most spoken first languages in Lake Worth Beach were English at 56.61%, Spanish at 26.57%, and French Creole, which was spoken by 9.17% of the population. Lake Worth Beach has a large Finnish expatriate population, and Finnish is spoken by 2.57% of the city's residents as their native language. Furthermore, people of Finnish ancestry were 3.4% of the population. With 1,026 people claiming Finn descent in 2000, Lake Worth Beach had the largest concentration of Finnish people in the world outside of Finland. Other languages spoken by residents of the city include French at 1.96%, Mayan languages were spoken by 1.11% (primarily spoken by Guatemalans of Mayan descent), and German as a mother tongue was spoken by 0.52% of the population.

As of 2000, Lake Worth Beach had the twentieth highest percentage of Guatemalan residents in the United States, with 4.87% of the populace. It had the twenty-first highest percentage of Haitian residents in the United States, at 8.10% of the city's population, and the eighty-third highest percentage of Cuban residents in the United States, at 3.47% of its population. It also had the twenty-third most Hondurans in the United States, at 1.59% of all residents.

== Economy ==
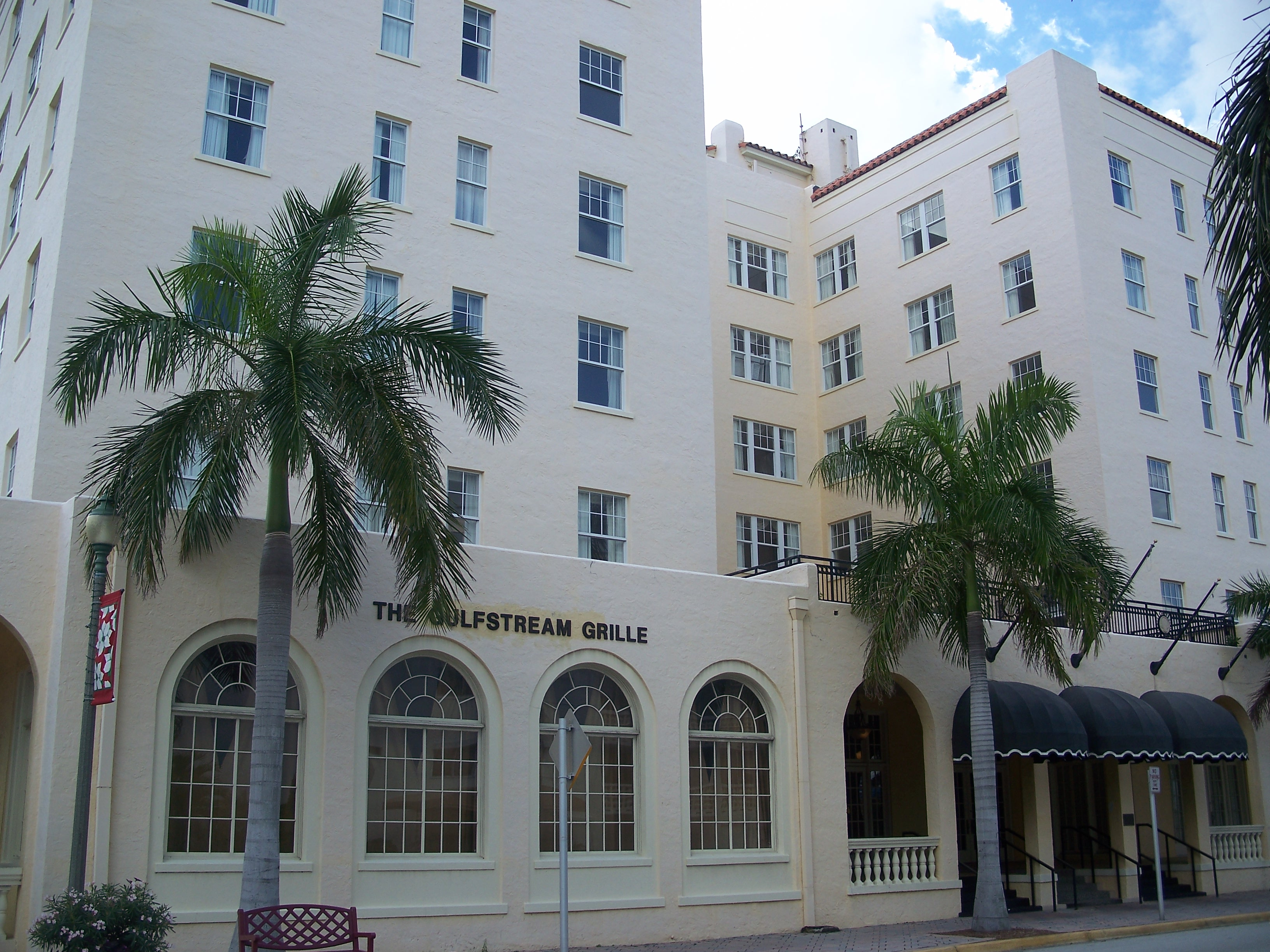
The Gulf Stream Hotel

The city has an estimated labor force of 19,978 people as of 2019, though 10,357 people age 16 or older were not in the labor force. Lake Worth Beach had a non-seasonally adjusted unemployment rate of 4.2% in September 2021. The largest companies in the city by number of employees include 1,148 employees at Palm Beach State College, 307 employees with the city government, 269 employees at Lake Worth Community High School, 213 employees at American Medical Assistance, 150 employees at Highland Elementary School, 148 employees at Publix, 136 employees at Barton Elementary School, 122 employees at Supermercados El Bodegon, 94 employees at North Grade Elementary School, and 74 employees at Lake Worth Middle School. However, as of 2019, only 6.9% of jobs in Lake Worth Beach were held by city residents, with the most common other residencies being West Palm Beach (12.4%), Boca Raton (5.3%), Palm Springs (4.9%), Boynton Beach (4.8%), and Delray Beach (3.7%). The most common professions among the city's labor force are professional, scientific, management, administrative, and waste management services (20.9%); construction (13.2%); educational services, health care, and social assistance (14.0%); arts, entertainment, and recreation, and accommodation and food services (12.5%); and retail (10.5%).

The Lake Worth Beach CRA, established in 1989, seeks to redevelop private and public properties for the sake of community and economic growth. Since 2001, the CRA area has included the entirety of Dixie Highway and areas in the vicinity of 6th Avenue South and 10th Avenue North. The downtown area also saw a resurgence in the late 1990s, with many art galleries, sidewalk cafés, and night clubs lining its streets. LULA Lake Worth Arts lists many of these downtown businesses on its Dynamic Walker's Map.

The Gulf Stream Hotel, which has been closed to the public since 2005, has been proposed for renovation to reopen it, which voters strongly approved by a margin of 81.82% – 18.18% in March 2020. In June of the following year, the city commission approved a proposal to renovate the hotel and construct a new hotel nearby. Restoration St. Louis agreed to spend at least $100 million on both projects, while the city agreed to fund infrastructure improvements around the hotel, with expenditures ranging from $1 million to possibly up to $3.6 million.

== Government ==
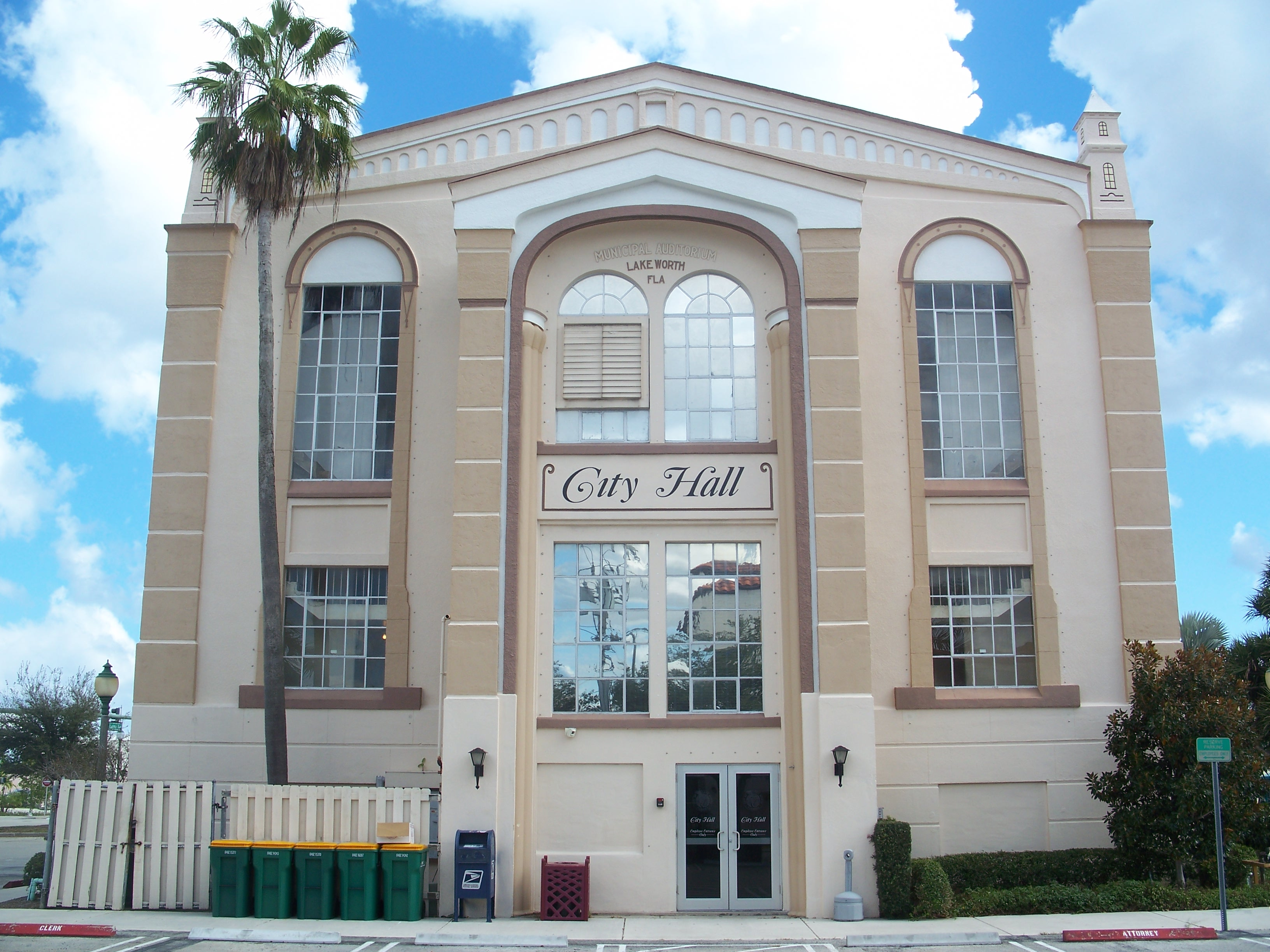
Lake Worth Beach City Hall

The city uses the commission–manager form of government. Lake Worth Beach has a five-member city commission. These members are elected to staggered, three-year terms, running on nonpartisan candidacies in different districts. The city commission acts in a legislative manner, approving motions, ordinances, and resolutions. The mayor, who presides over the city commission, also serves in three-year terms, but is elected by voters citywide. As outlined by the city charter, these elections are to be held on the second Tuesday in March, while runoffs are to be held two weeks later if a candidate fails to achieve a majority of the votes. Betty Resch has served as mayor since March 16, 2021. The Lake Worth Beach city clerk is tasked with maintaining official city records. This office is currently held by Melissa Ann Coyne. Another key Lake Worth Beach official is the city manager, who is responsible for the administrative functions of city government. Carmen Davis, who previously served as county administrator of Hinds County, Mississippi, from 2010 to 2019 and a city planner for Detroit from 1993 to 2009, is the current city manager of Lake Worth Beach.

Lake Worth Beach is part of Florida's 21st congressional district, which has been represented by Lois Frankel (D) since 2017. Four different Florida House of Representatives districts cover portions of Lake Worth Beach – the 87th, 88th, 89th, and 90th districts, which are represented by David Silvers (D), Jervonte Edmonds (D), Mike Caruso (R), and Joseph Casello (D), respectively. The entire city is located within the Florida Senate's 24th district, which includes parts of east-central Palm Beach County and is currently represented by Bobby Powell (D). Much of Lake Worth Beach is within the 3rd district for the Palm Beach County Board of County Commissioners, while the municipal beach section and areas south of 6th Avenue South and east of Interstate 95 are within the 7th district. The former is represented by Dave Kerner and the latter is represented by Mack Bernard.

Overall, the city has a liberal partisan lean. Of the 17,738 registered voters as of December 2021, 8,552 were members of the Democratic Party, 5,290 had no party affiliation, 3,471 were members of the Republican Party, and 425 were members of a minor party. Decades earlier, the city and Palm Beach County were both reliably right-leaning, with the latter voting for the Republican Party nominee for president of the United States in each election from 1948 to 1988. In 2020, Joe Biden defeated Donald Trump in all of the city's precincts and in most by a margin of at least 20%, while the county supported Biden by a margin of just under 12.8%. Lake Worth Herald president Mark Easton, a lifelong resident of the city, noted that he had observed the partisan lean of Lake Worth Beach shift rapidly from highly conservative to highly liberal. Easton remarked that due to diversity, "You would think that it would meld Lake Worth into a more middle-of-the-road atmosphere: Never happens. It always stays polarized".

== Culture ==
=== Arts ===
The Cultural Council for Palm Beach County, founded by Alexander W. Dreyfoos Jr. as the Palm Beach County Council of the Arts in West Palm Beach in 1978, evolved into the official county government agency to support and promote local arts and culture. In 2012, the organization relocated from West Palm Beach to the Robert M. Montgomery Jr. Building in Lake Worth Beach and renovated the building with the assistance of the Lake Worth Beach CRA. This building was formerly the 1,000 seat Lake Theatre, which opened at 601 Lake Avenue in 1940, constructed at a cost of $75,000. The Cultural Council for Palm Beach County hosts many cultural events at its headquarters and elsewhere in Palm Beach County.

Several art galleries are located in downtown Lake Worth Beach. These include the Art Link International, Artisans on the Ave, Benzaiten, Bruce Konder Galleries, Flamingo Gallery, HATCH 1121, No So So, and Palm Beach Gallery. The Cultural Council for Palm Beach County also lists art organizations and facilities such as the Armory Arts Center, Bamboo Room, Book Cellar, Downtown Dance, Lake Worth Art League, Lake Worth Playhouse, Lake Worth Public Library, Social House, and Urban Arts Lofts. The Lake Worth Playhouse was founded in 1953. The building it is housed in originally opened in 1929 as the Oakley Theatre, which had previously been virtually demolished by the 1928 Okeechobee hurricane. However, the Oakley Theatre quickly went into bankruptcy due to the Great Depression. Today, the Lake Worth Playhouse hosts a number of year-round events, including ballets, dramas, foreign and independent films, musicals, and operas.

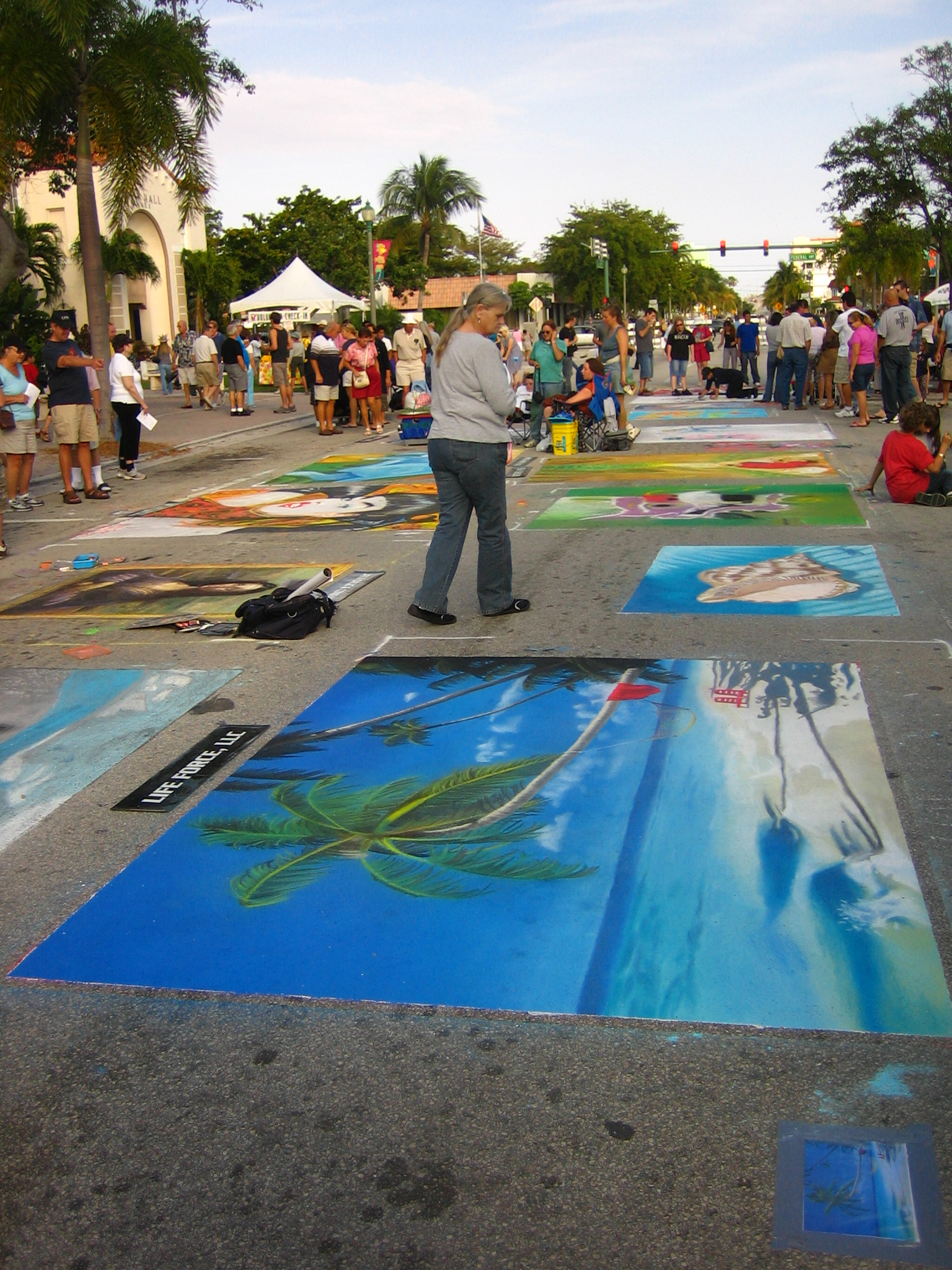
Lake Worth Street Painting Festival

=== Festivals ===
Lake Worth Beach features several annual festivals. The Lake Worth Beach Street Painting Festival attracts about 100,000 people to the downtown area, where more than 600 artists create works on the asphalt along Lake Avenue and Lucerne Avenue. Similarly, FOCUS Lake Worth features displays of multidisciplinary art at different mural locations in downtown in the month of November. Midnight Sun Festival, originally called Finlandia Days, is an event celebrating Lake Worth Beach's Finnish population and has been held annually at Bryant Park since 1983. When combined with neighboring Lantana's Finnish community, it becomes one of the largest Finnish communities in the United States. One of the largest Oktoberfest events in South Florida is held every October just outside the city at the American German Club of the Palm Beaches on Lantana Road, while Mathews Brewing Company in Lake Worth Beach also observes Oktoberfest. In late October, a Día de los Muertos event is also held in the downtown area.

The annual Palm Beach Pride parade is held in Lake Worth Beach. According to Discover The Palm Beaches, over 30,000 people attend the event, which is one of the largest pride parades in Florida and the oldest active in the state. Lake Worth Beach also has the county's only LGBT community center, Compass, and the gay bar Mad Hatter Lounge. The City Tree Board organizes an annual "Lake Worth Festival of Trees", while a monthly celebration called "Lake Ave Block Party" takes place in the Cultural Plaza, next to the City Hall Annex. The city hosts bonfires at the Lake Worth Beach Casino and Beach Complex on the second and fourth Fridays from November to February. Additionally, the city government, in conjunction with several local businesses and organizations, holds ceremonies and parades for other commonly recognized holidays.

=== Cinematography ===
A substantial portion of the 1981 movie, Body Heat, starring William Hurt and Kathleen Turner, was filmed in downtown Lake Worth Beach. The city became the fictitious town of Miranda Beach. In the movie, the building at 813 Lucerne Avenue became Stella's Coffee Shop, Lake Worth City Hall became Miranda Beach City Hall, and the building at 811 Lake Avenue became Ned's office, while the film also showed the French restaurant L'Anjou (now Los Panchos Tacos & Tequila Bar). Former Congressman Mark Foley appeared as an extra in the film. Three years later, the 1984 movie Harry & Son was also filmed in Lake Worth Beach.

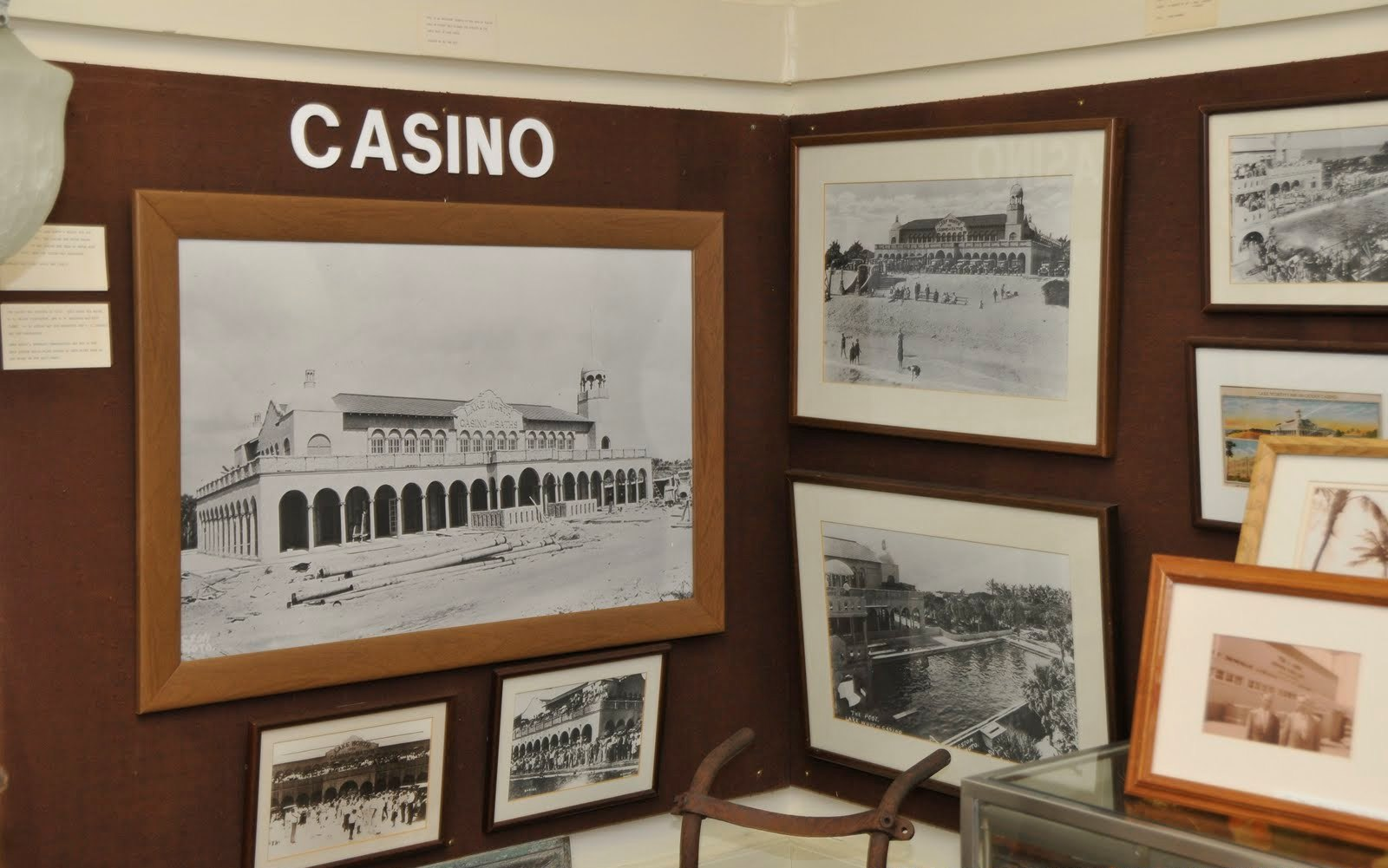
Historic Lake Worth Casino photos displayed in the historical museum

=== Historical preservation ===
The Lake Worth Historical Museum is located on the second floor of the old Lake Worth City Hall, which functioned as the city's administrative center from the 1920s to 1973. Additionally, the Historical Society of Lake Worth is located at the public library. Substantial efforts by the city to preserve historic structures and districts dates back to an ordinance approved by the city commission in 1996. In 2017, the Lake Worth Beach Department of Community Sustainability and Division of Planning, Zoning and Historic Preservation; the Historic Resources Preservation Board; and the Historical Society of Lake Worth designated seven homes constructed in 1912 as historical properties, identified as the oldest residences in the city without major alterations. Additionally, between 1913 and 1949, many cottages were constructed. According to the 2016 book Cottages of Lake Worth Beach – Living Large in Small Spaces, approximately 1,000 cottages remain, constituting the largest concentration of this type of dwelling in Florida.

The Lake Worth Beach government considers six areas to be historic districts: College Park, Northeast Lucerne, Old Lucerne, Old Town, Southeast Lucerne, and South Palm Park. Moreover, the federal NRHP lists three historic districts and three historic structures in Lake Worth Beach. The historic districts listed are College Park, Old Lucerne, and Old Town, while the structures listed are the Gulf Stream Hotel, Old Lake Worth City Hall, and Osborne School. Additionally, the Osborne School is also listed in Florida's Historic Black Public Schools Multiple Property Submission.

== Education ==
Public schools in Lake Worth Beach are part of the School District of Palm Beach County. Elementary school students are served by four public schools, all located within the boundaries of Lake Worth Beach – Barton Elementary, Highland Elementary, North Grade Elementary, and South Grade Elementary. Middle school students north of 12th Avenue South attend Lake Worth Middle School, while those living south of 12th Avenue South attend Lantana Community Middle School in Lantana. All public high school students in the city are assigned to Lake Worth Community High School. Established in 1922, it is the oldest continuously operating high school in Palm Beach County.

Sacred Heart Catholic Church operates a separate private school (pre-K–8) in Lake Worth Beach. There is also a charter school in the city, the Academy for Positive Learning.

Additionally, within the city's boundaries is the former Osborne School, also known as Osborne Elementary School. Constructed in 1948, the school served black elementary students in the formerly segregated Osborne neighborhood until 1971. Subsequently, busing policies implemented in the early 1970s left the Osborne School vacant. Since 2003, the school building has been listed in both the NRHP and Florida's Historic Black Public Schools Multiple Property Submission.

The main campus of Palm Beach State College is located in unincorporated Lake Worth. It is the oldest community college in Florida, founded in 1933 as Palm Beach Junior College. It was at one time located on the campus of Palm Beach High School, at the present day Dreyfoos School of the Arts in downtown West Palm Beach. The school moved to its present location in 1956. The name was changed to Palm Beach Community College in 1988 and later renamed Palm Beach State College in 2010 to reflect that the school was offering four-year degrees.

=== Public libraries ===
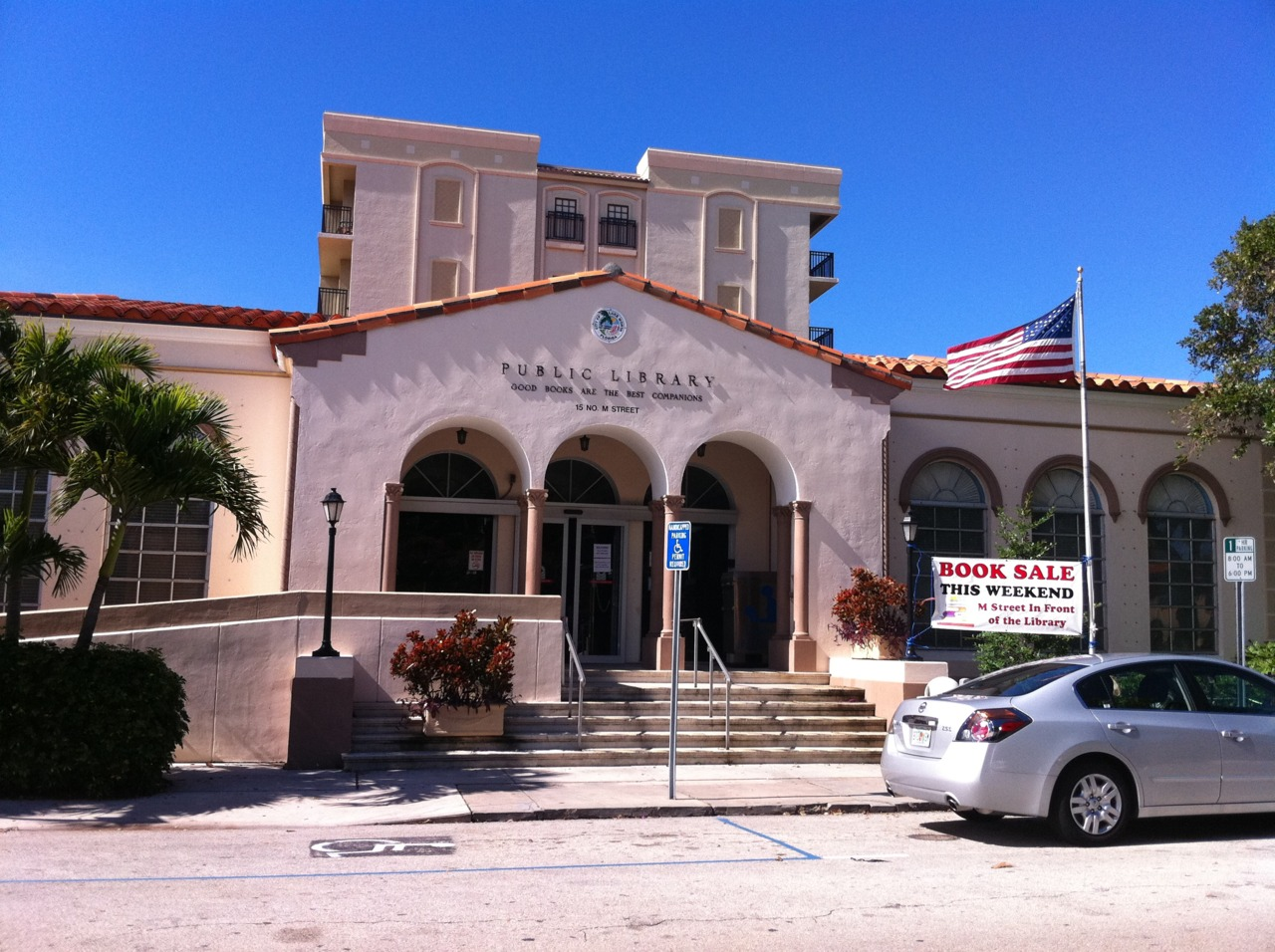
The Lake Worth Beach Public Library

The Lake Worth Beach Public Library, located in the historic downtown area at 15 North M Street, is a Mediterranean-style architectural building, completed in 1941 at a cost of $66,000, an amount raised by the Lake Worth Library Association. A dedicatory service was held on August 12, 1941. It is a part of the Library Cooperative of the Palm Beaches. Annually, the library circulates approximately 65,000 items, including 57,468 books.

Efforts to organize a library date back to 1912, one year prior to the city's incorporation. Residents saw the need for a library and requested book donations via an advertisement in the Lucerne Herald newspaper in May 1912. R.D. Strong and John L. McKissock then established the Lake Worth Library Association on November 30. For several years, the library was housed inside a reading room located in City Hall. Although residents voted to officially establish the Lake Worth Public Library and allot $6,000 for the construction of a building in 1926, the funds remained insufficient.

Congress approved a bill allotting $60,000 to construct a building bearing the name Major General William Jenkins Worth Memorial Library in 1939, nearly 100 years after the body of water was named in his honor. However, after President Franklin D. Roosevelt vetoed the bill, the residents of the community continued raising funds until the building was finally completed in 1941. James and William Strait also contributed $10,000 for an art museum wing, which is now the children's section. The library also houses noted artist R. Sherman Winton's only known collection, which features historical Florida themes of the Spanish period, as well as wood carvings by Sam J. Schlappich, a local artist who was featured in the Century of Progress Fair in 1933 and the World's Fair in 1939.

In addition to the Lake Worth Beach Public Library, the city has more than 100 Little Free Library book exchanges as of late 2020. The construction and maintenance of the Little Free Libraries began due to the efforts of resident Mary Lindsey and over 120 voluneeters. By December 2020, the Little Free Library system in Lake Worth Beach had distributed approximately 500,000 books.

== Recreation ==
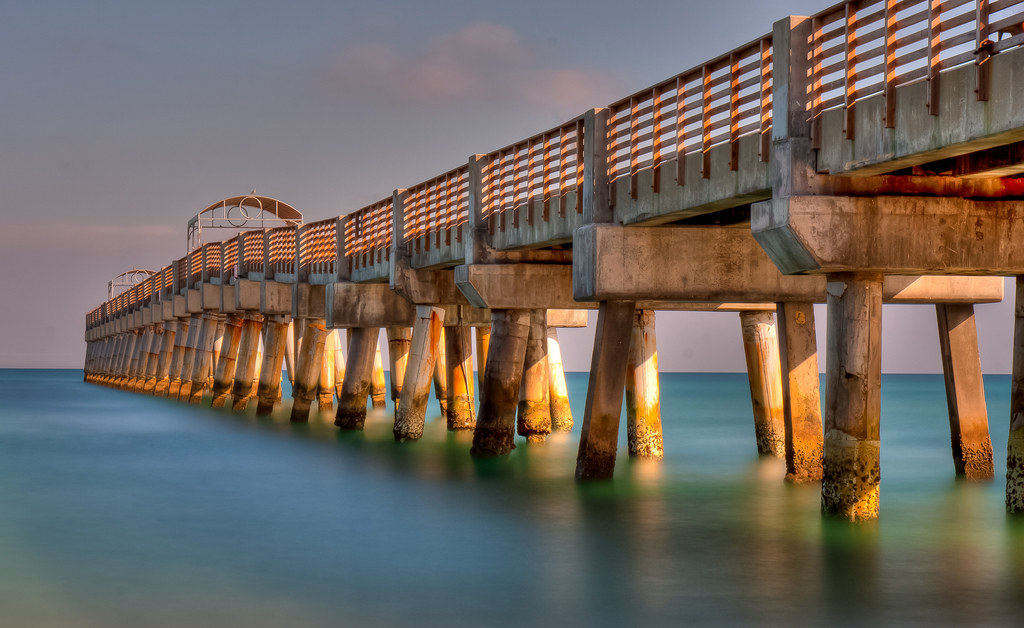
The William O. Lockhart Municipal Pier in 2011

The city's municipal beach is one of Southeast Florida's few remaining large areas of open, public space along the ocean. In 2013, the Lake Worth Casino complex reopened following a two-year, $6 million renovation. The neoclassical building approximates the original 1920s casino building, which served as a gambling establishment until the 1930s and had stood overlooking the ocean until it was replaced by a more modern, boxy building after the 1947 hurricane. Near the casino is the William O. Lockhart Municipal Pier, a popular landmark in Lake Worth Beach. Following Hurricane Frances in 2004, the pier was repaired and raised 5 feet (1.5 m). The structure of the pier and wave action result in the creation of sandbars, which, according to the Lake Worth CRA, causes the pier to "provide the most consistent surf in South Florida".

The Snook Islands Natural Area, located on the west shore of the Intracoastal Waterway just north of the bridge, is a 118-acre (48 hectarce) wetland restoration area that includes a boardwalk, floating dock, and kayak launch. The nearby municipal golf course includes 18-holes with a view across the Intracoastal Waterway. Bryant Park, located in downtown Lake Worth Beach, has an Addison Mizner-designed 1930s bandshell, which is used for festivals and other events. Overall, Lake Worth Beach has more than 20 recreational facilities and municipal parks. On the west side of the city, the county-owned John Prince Memorial Park follows the winding shores of Lake Osborne and offers several miles of bike and walking trails as well as hundreds of acres for picnicking, volleyball, and overnight camping.

== Media ==
The Lake Worth Herald and Coastal/Greenacres Observer is a weekly newspaper based in the city. In addition to publishing news about Lake Worth Beach, the paper also reports on local stories in Greenacres, Hypoluxo, Lake Clarke Shores, Lantana, Manalapan, Palm Springs, and South Palm Beach. The Lake Worth Herald began publication in 1912 as the Lucerne Herald and is considered the city's oldest business, while the Coastal/Greenacres Observer is a sister publication founded in 1969. Lake Worth Beach, as well as Palm Beach County and the Treasure Coast, are also served daily by The Palm Beach Post, founded in 1909 as the weekly Palm Beach County, which had the fifth largest circulation for a newspaper in Florida as of November 2017.

Lake Worth Beach is part of the West Palm Beach–Fort Pierce television market, ranked as the 38th largest in the United States by Nielsen Media Research. The market is served by stations affiliated with major American networks including WPTV-TV/5 (NBC), WPEC/12 (CBS), WPBF/25 (ABC), WFLX/29 (FOX), WTVX/34 (CW), WXEL-TV/42 (PBS), WTCN-CD/43 (MYTV), WWHB-CD/48 (Azteca), WHDT/59 (Court TV), WFGC/61 (CTN), WPXP-TV/67 (ION), as well as local channel WBWP-LD/57 (Ind.).

Many radio stations are located within range of the city. Radio station WWRF, an AM Regional Mexican station, is based in Lake Worth Beach.

== Infrastructure ==
=== Transportation ===
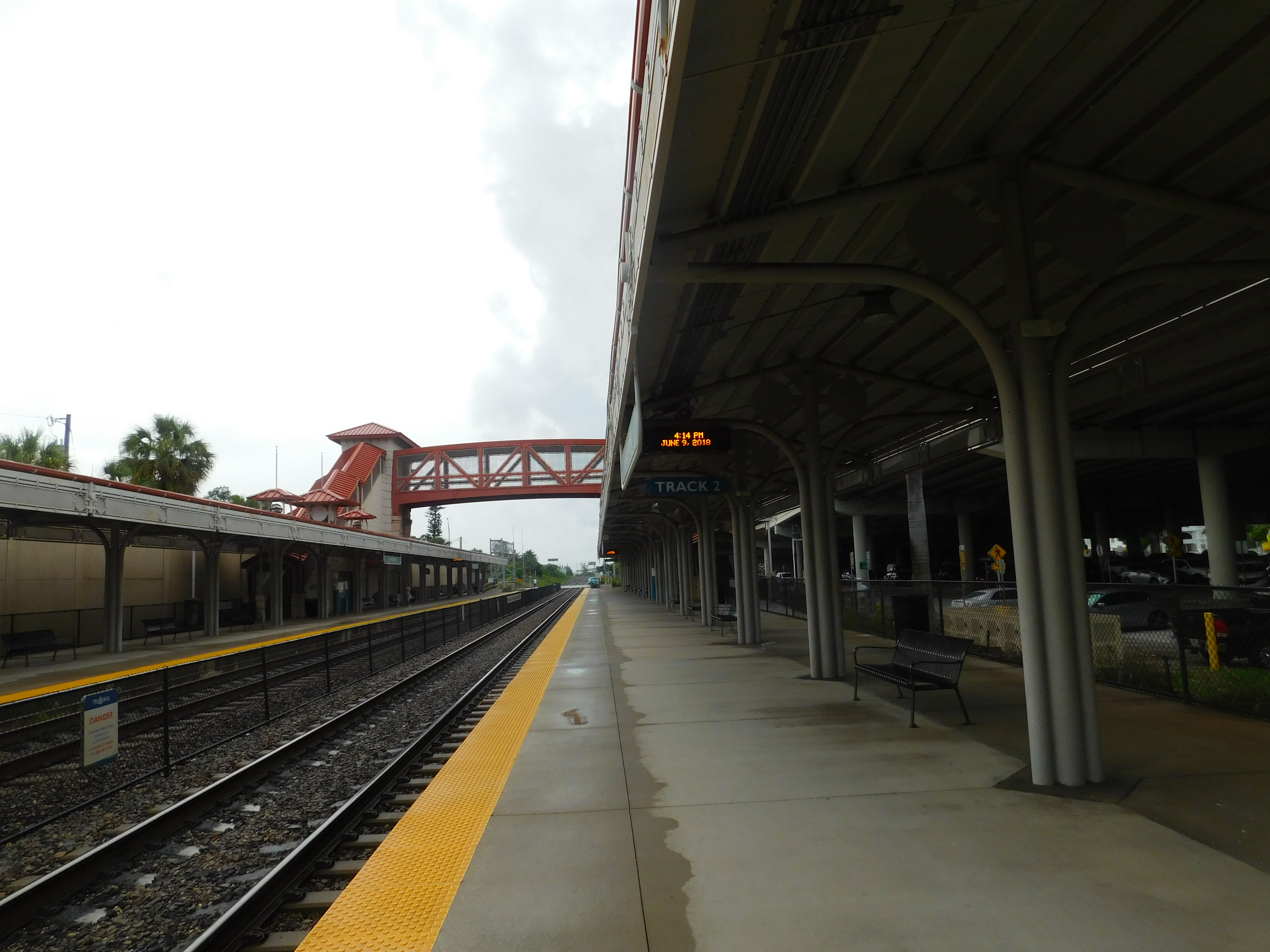
Lake Worth Tri-Rail Station.

Interstate 95 runs north-to-south along the west side of the city, with two ramps in Lake Worth Beach, one at 10th Avenue North and the other at 6th Avenue South. Several highways traverse the city. U.S. Route 1 (Dixie Highway) and state roads 5 (North Federal Highway) and A1A run north-to-south in Lake Worth Beach, while State Road 802 (Lake Worth Road, Lake Avenue, and Lucerne Avenue) runs east-to-west. The Robert A. Harris Bridge, constructed in 1973, links Lake Worth Beach to its municipal beach section, crossing the Intracoastal Waterway (Lake Worth Lagoon) at State Road 802. President Donald J. Trump International Airport is the nearest commercial airport, located in neighboring West Palm Beach, while the public-use Palm Beach County Park Airport is situated just southwest of the city.

The Tri-Rail commuter rail system serves the city at the Lake Worth Beach station, which opened in 1989. Tri-Rail connects Lake Worth Beach to other cities in eastern Palm Beach County and to Broward and Miami-Dade counties. It is also served by PalmTran buses. This includes Route 1, which runs northward and southward along Dixie Highway; Route 61, which runs along 10th Avenue North to Dixie Highway to Lucerne Avenue and reaches Palm Beach State College before reversing its course (going eastward along Lake Avenue); Route 62, which runs eastward along Lake Worth Road and Lake Avenue to the municipal beach and then reverses course along Lucerne Avenue; and Route 64, which runs eastward along 6th Avenue South to Dixie Highway, then southward to 12th Avenue South, and finally southward along Barton Road and Andrew Redding Road before reversing course at the Lantana Lake Worth Health Center in Lantana.

=== Emergency services ===
Lake Worth Beach previously operated its own fire department from 1913 until 2009, when firefighters voted to merge with Palm Beach County Fire Rescue (PBCFR). Among the supporting factors in the merger were cost-saving measures for the city and better career advancement opportunities for firefighters. PBCFR has two stations within the city's boundaries, Station 91 at 1020 Lucerne Avenue (Battalion 3 headquarters) and Station 93 at 1229 Detroit Street. To prepare for, mitigate, and recover from emergencies and disasters, Lake Worth Beach's Emergency Management Program has established the Emergency Management team. Parts of the city are located within Evacuation Zone C, which is ordered to evacuate when a Category 3 hurricane (or stronger) threatens the area. The nearest hospital is the JFK Medical Center in Atlantis.

Lake Worth Beach has a local reputation for high crime and has been counted as among the highest crime cities in the state. Partially due to this, city commissioners narrowly voted to disband the Lake Worth Police Department in 2008, with law enforcement duties being taken over by the Palm Beach County Sheriff's Office (PBSO). At the time, the municipal police department employed 91 sworn officers. Crime initially fell in the years following the merger, with murders down 73%, robberies down 47%, and burglaries down 23% from the period of 2007 to 2014. Violent crime rates then dropped by double-digit percentages for three consecutive years, 2016–2018. However, in 2019, the violent crime rate increased by 5.2% from the previous year. Much of the rise was attributable to an increase in aggravated assaults, although the city reported a decrease in burglaries and rapes. Today, PBSO maintains a police substation at 120 North G Street as part of their 14th district, which encompasses the municipal boundaries of Lake Worth Beach and has 82 deputies and 12 civilian employees.

In addition to high crime rates, the city was part of the worsening opioid epidemic in the United States. From 2015 to 2016, the number of suspected drug overdose deaths rose by 56%. As of 2016, the estimated rate of overdose deaths was 20 out of every 10,000 people, higher than in neighboring towns. Overdose rates began decreasing in the late 2010s. PBSO reported 301 overdoses in Lake Worth Beach between May 2019 and April 2020, down from 354 between May 2018 and April 2019.

=== Utilities ===
In contrast with many other localities in eastern Florida, who are usually served by Florida Power & Light, Lake Worth Beach operates its own electrical utility. Founded in 1914 as the "Lake Worth Water, Light, and Ice Company" to serve about 600 residents, Lake Worth Beach Electric Utility has approximately 27,000 customers as of 2019. This also includes about 7,200 customers in Palm Springs and some adjacent unincorporated areas of Palm Beach County. In an effort to reduce greenhouse gas emissions, the city purchased and began operating a solar farm in 2017, becoming the first municipality in Florida to do so. By May 2021, more than 38% of power generated by Lake Worth Beach Electric Utility originated from solar energy. Citizen Owned Energy forecasts that greenhouse gas emissions generated by the Lake Worth Beach Electric Utility will decrease to less than half of its 2005 levels by 2024.

The Lake Worth Beach Water Utilities Department is responsible for providing residents with drinking water and the collection of wastewater and stormwater. Drinking water originates at a water treatment plant and is distributed via about 168 mi (270 km) of pipelines across the city. Lake Worth Beach owns and operates 33 pump stations, along with roughly 125 mi (201 km) of gravity and pressure pipes. Additionally, the city owns and maintains a master pump station, which also collects wastewater from Atlantis, Lake Clarke Shores, Manalapan, Palm Beach State College, South Palm Beach, and Palm Spring. This wastewater is then sent to the East Central Regional Water Reclamation Facility for treatment. Stormwater is collected via 46 outfalls, which drain into the Lake Worth Lagoon.

== Notable people ==
- Arthur Altman, songwriter
- Trey Amburgey, Major League Baseball (MLB) player for the New York Yankees and in Nippon Professional Baseball (NPB) for the Yokohama DeNA BayStars
- Martin Amis, author
- Toni Arden, singer
- Joe Arnold, former college and professional baseball coach
- LaVon Brazill, former National Football League (NFL) wide receiver for the Indianapolis Colts
- Nathaniel Brazill, former Lake Worth resident, who at age 13, fatally shot his Lake Worth Middle School teacher
- Mark Brownson, former MLB professional baseball right-handed pitcher, who played for the Colorado Rockies (1998–1999) and Philadelphia Phillies (2000)
- Irving Campbell, former college football wide receiver for Georgia Southern, Michigan State, and former Arena Football League (AFL) player
- Daniel Cane, cofounder of Blackboard Inc., CourseInfo LLC, and CEO and co-founder of Modernizing Medicine
- Maurice Cardin, American politician who served in the Maryland House of Delegates from Baltimore City's 5th district (1951–1966)
- Matt Cetlinski, former competition swimmer, Olympic gold medalist, and former world record-holder
- James Currie, birdwatching expert and television show host
- Mary Dees, actress
- Craig Eaton, former MLB pitcher for the Kansas City Royals
- Violet Englefield, actress and singer
- Kevin Fagan, former NFL defensive end for the San Francisco 49ers, two-time Super Bowl champion (XXIII and XXIV)
- George Fallon, former MLB player with the Brooklyn Dodgers (1937) and St. Louis Cardinals (1943–1945), 1944 World Series champion
- Guy Fieri, celebrity chef
- Mark Foley, former United States House of Representatives member and a former elected city official
- Charles Frederick, former American football wide receiver for the University of Washington, Spokane Shock (2006 and 2012), 2007 co-AFL Rookie of the Year with the Kansas City Brigade
- Jonathan Garvin, American football United Football League (UFL) linebacker for the Birmingham Stallions, former college football player at the University of Miami
- Ghostemane, hip-hop recording artist
- George Haas Jr., polo player, businessman
- Andrea Hall, actress, soap opera star, and sister of identical twin, Deidre Hall
- Deidre Hall, actress, soap opera star, and sister of identical twin, Andrea Hall
- Andy Hansen, MLB pitcher with the New York Giants (1944–1950) and Philadelphia Phillies (1951–1953)
- Omari Hardy, politician, former member of the Florida House of Representatives (88th district) and former Lake Worth Beach commissioner
- Scott Henderson, jazz fusion and blues guitarist, band member of Tribal Tech
- Sam Hughes, former American football quarterback who played a season with the Miami Hooters of the AFL, former college football player at Louisiana Tech University
- Nicki Hunter, pornographic film director, producer, and former pornographic actress
- Philip L. B. Iglehart, Chilean American polo player, co-founder of the Museum of Polo and Hall of Fame
- Teresa James, aviator, one of the first Women Airforce Service Pilots (WASP) pilots, was part of the Women's Auxiliary Ferrying Squadron (WAFS)
- Ken Jenne, former Democratic member of the Florida State Senate, former sheriff of Broward County (Broward County Sheriff's Office)
- Corey Jones, was shot to death by police officer Nouman K. Raja, while waiting for a tow truck by his disabled car
- Ricot Joseph, former American football safety in the NFL for the Washington Redskins and Cincinnati Bengals, former college football at the University of Central Florida
- Dave Kerner, director of the Florida Department of Highway Safety and Motor Vehicles, former Palm Bach County mayor and a county commissioner, former Democratic member of the Florida House of Representatives
- Craig Kobel, former AFL and NFL player
- Brooks Koepka, professional golfer, won the U.S. Open in 2017 and 2018 and the PGA Championship in 2018 and 2019
- Scott "Raven" Levy, professional wrestler
- James Looney, former NFL tight end for the Green Bay Packers, brother of former NFL player, Joe Looney
- Joe Looney, former NFL offensive lineman for the San Francisco 49ers, Tennessee Titans, and Dallas Cowboys, and brother of former NFL player, James Looney
- K.C. McDermott, American football offensive guard previously for the Jacksonville Jaguars, former college football player for the Miami Hurricanes, brother of NFL player, Shane McDermott
- Shane McDermott, American football center for the Carolina Panthers, New York Giants and Dallas Cowboys, former college football player at the University of Miami, brother of NFL player, K.C. McDermott.
- Jean Sullivan McKeigue, former member of the Boston School Committee (1980–1984) and former president of that committee (1983)
- Norma Metrolis, All-American Girls Professional Baseball League catcher
- Bill Meredith, musician, journalist
- Frank Messersmith, former politician and member of Florida House of Representatives for the (85th district: 1980–1990)
- Vahid Mirzadeh, tennis player
- Jacob Montes, midfielder soccer player for the Brazilian Série A club Botafogo and caps for the Nicaragua national team
- Cindy Morgan, actress
- Robin Morgan, poet, writer, activist, journalist, lecturer, former child actor, radical feminist
- Jacob P. Nathanson, former American lawyer and politician for the New York State Assembly
- Pat O'Donnell, NFL punter who played for Chicago Bears, Green Bay Packers, and Atlanta Falcons, and former college football at Cincinnati and Miami
- Joe Pags, conservative talk radio and television show host
- Alexa Pano, professional golfer
- James Patterson, author
- A. T. Perry, NFL wide receiver for the New Orleans Saints, former college football player at Wake Forest
- Theodore Pratt, journalist, novelist
- John and Greg Rice, held the distinction of "World's Shortest Living Twins", according to the Guinness World Records, until John died in 2005
- Betty Robbins, one of the first female Jewish cantors (hazzan)
- Herb Score, MLB player with the Cleveland Indians (1955–1959) and Chicago White Sox (1960–1962)
- Stanley Shakespeare, former NFL player
- Mayo Smith, MLB player, manager, and scout, 1968 World Series champion
- Snot, SoundCloud rapper, singer-songwriter
- Susan Stanton, former city manager in Largo who was fired after coming out as transgender, then was Lake Worth Beach's city manager (2006–2011)
- Michael Stern, reporter, author, philanthropist
- Otis Thorpe, former National Basketball Association (NBA) player, 1994 NBA Finals champion
- Trea Turner, active MLB player, currently with the Philadelphia Phillies, 2019 World Series champion
- Viola Turpeinen, acclaimed accordion player
- Edward Wallowitch, art photographer, youngest person to have their photographs featured at New York City's Museum of Modern Art
- Carroll Widdoes, former American college football coach and athletics administrator at Ohio State University (1944–1945) and Ohio University (1949–1957)
- Charles Whitman, mass murderer and perpetrator of the University of Texas tower shooting

== Sister cities ==
- Lappeenranta (Finland)
- Saint-Marc (Haiti)
- Southend-on-Sea (England)
- Sopot (Poland)

== See also ==
- Lake Worth Corridor, an unincorporated area outside the city limits of Lake Worth
