= Old Lucerne Historic Residential District =

Historic district in Florida, United States

- U.S. National Register of Historic Places
- U.S. Historic district
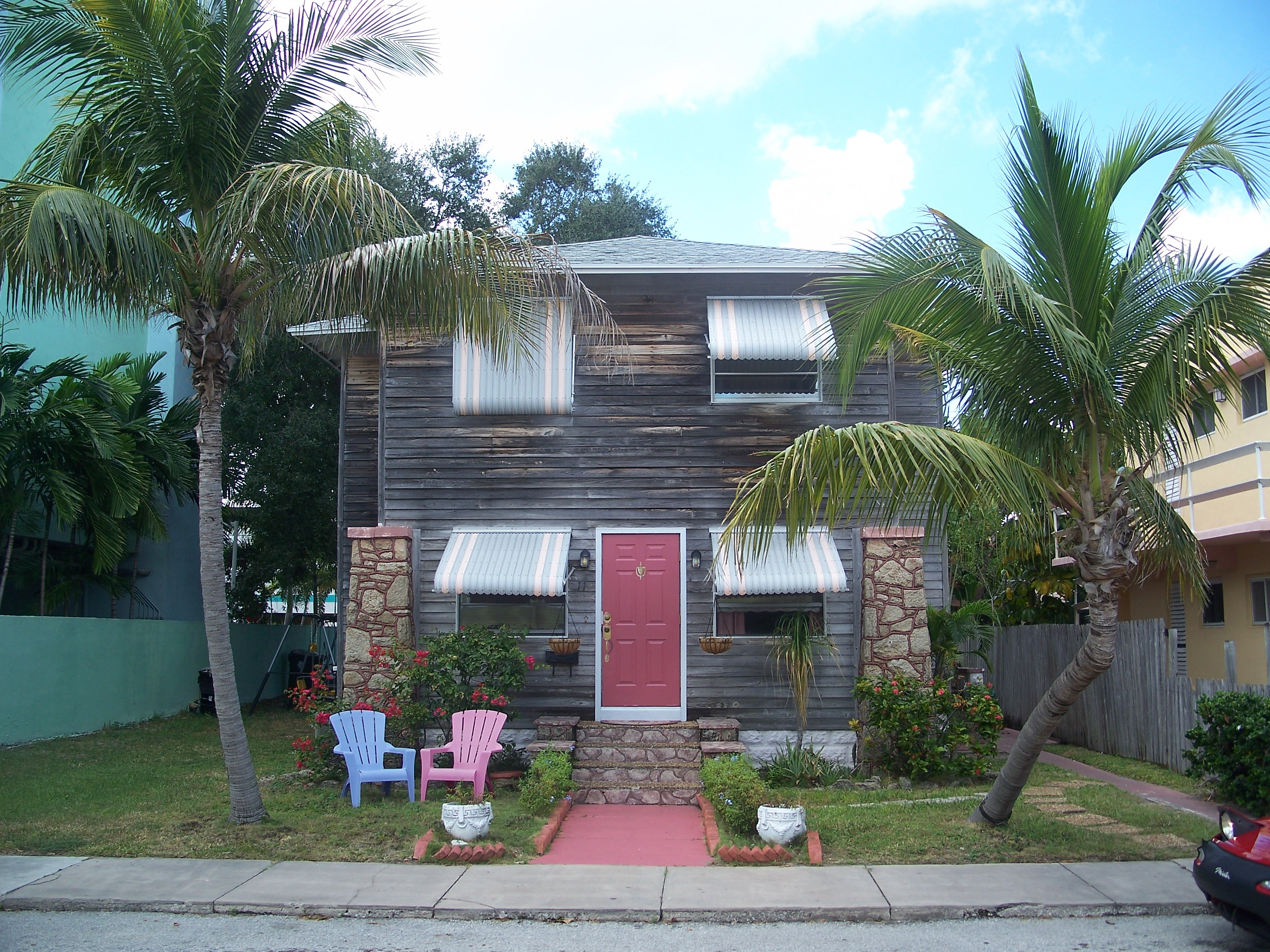

- Location within Florida Location within the United States
- Location: Lake Worth Beach, Florida
- Coordinates: 26°37′10.93″N 80°3′0.67″W
- Area: 540 acres (2.2 km^{2})
- Architectural style: Mission/Spanish Revival
- NRHP reference No.: 01000526
- Added to NRHP: June 4, 2001

The Old Lucerne Historic Residential District (also known as Townsite of Lucerne) is a U.S. historic district (designated as such on June 4, 2001) located in Lake Worth Beach, Florida. The district runs roughly along North Lakeside Drive, North Palmway Street, and North O Street, from Lake Avenue to 7th Avenue N. It contains 218 historic buildings.
