= Gulf Stream Hotel =

- U.S. National Register of Historic Places
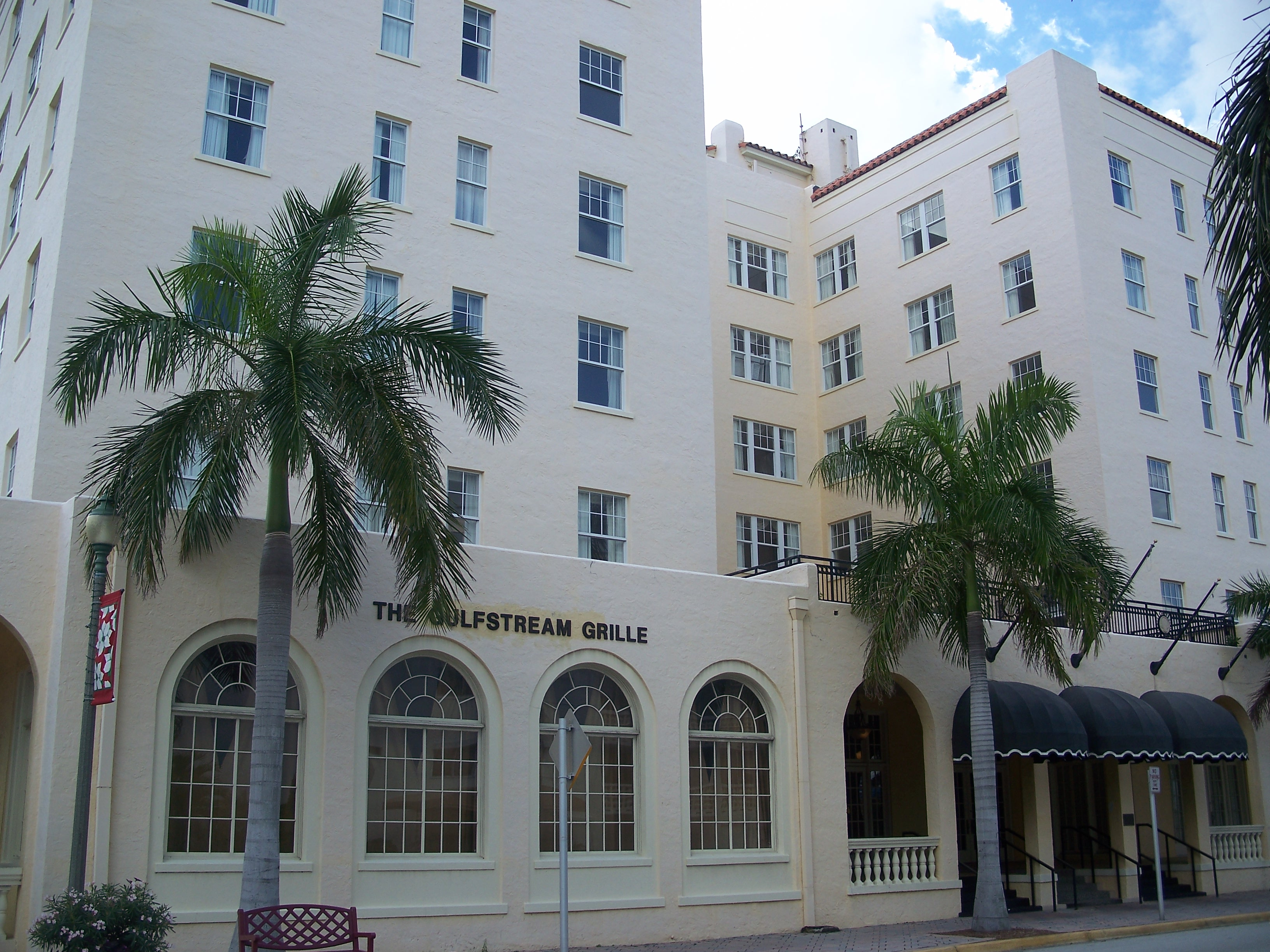

- Location within Florida Location within the United States
- Location: Lake Worth Beach, Florida
- Coordinates: 26°36′55″N 80°2′56″W
- Architect: G. Lloyd Preacher & Company
- NRHP reference No.: 83001435
- Added to NRHP: January 11, 1983

The Gulf Stream Hotel is a historic hotel in Lake Worth Beach, Florida. It is located at 1 Lake Avenue, Lake Worth Beach, Florida in Palm Beach County. It was added to the U.S. National Register of Historic Places in 1983.

== History ==
Originally built in 1923 as El Nuevo Hotel, the hotel was renamed the Gulf Stream Hotel in 1924 and later became the Gulfstream Hotel. Located at 1 Lake Avenue in Lake Worth Beach, Florida, it was developed to accommodate the influx of visitors during the real estate boom. The project, led by G.H. Glover, William Nutter, and Frank Heywood, was backed by local banks and investors. Construction faced financial delays, but after a redesign by G. Lloyd Preacher & Company, the hotel opened on January 25, 1925, at a final cost exceeding $600,000.

As banks failed across South Florida, the hotel struggled financially. The devastating 1928 hurricane caused severe damage, forcing its closure. It remained shuttered until 1936 when it was sold at a tax auction for just $25,000. General Richard C. Marshall II and Colonel H. Cabel Maddux purchased the property, forming the Hygeia Hotel Company. They undertook extensive renovations, and by 1937, the hotel reopened, thriving as the economy improved.

From 1941 to 1971, Ben Pease managed the hotel, after which William R. Donnell and his family took over operations until 1992. On January 11, 1983, the hotel was added to the U.S. National Register of Historic Places as the Gulf Stream Hotel.

In 2005, the hotel closed due to financial difficulties and mismanagement. Ceebraid-Signal Corp purchased it for $12.9 million, but it later faced foreclosure.

== Media ==
A book was written about the classic hotel in 1976 titled The Gulf Stream Hotel Story by Glenn Ingram.

== Restoration ==
After being vacant for approximately 15 years, restoration efforts are underway to restore the property led by Amrit and Amy Gill of Restoration St. Louis. The renovation plans include restoring the original 90-room hotel and constructing an adjacent mixed-use building. The project is expected to be completed within 24 months from its commencement, in two phases with an anticipated phase one opening date in late 2025 led by general manager, Lawrence Cassenti.
