= Old Lake Worth City Hall =

- U.S. National Register of Historic Places
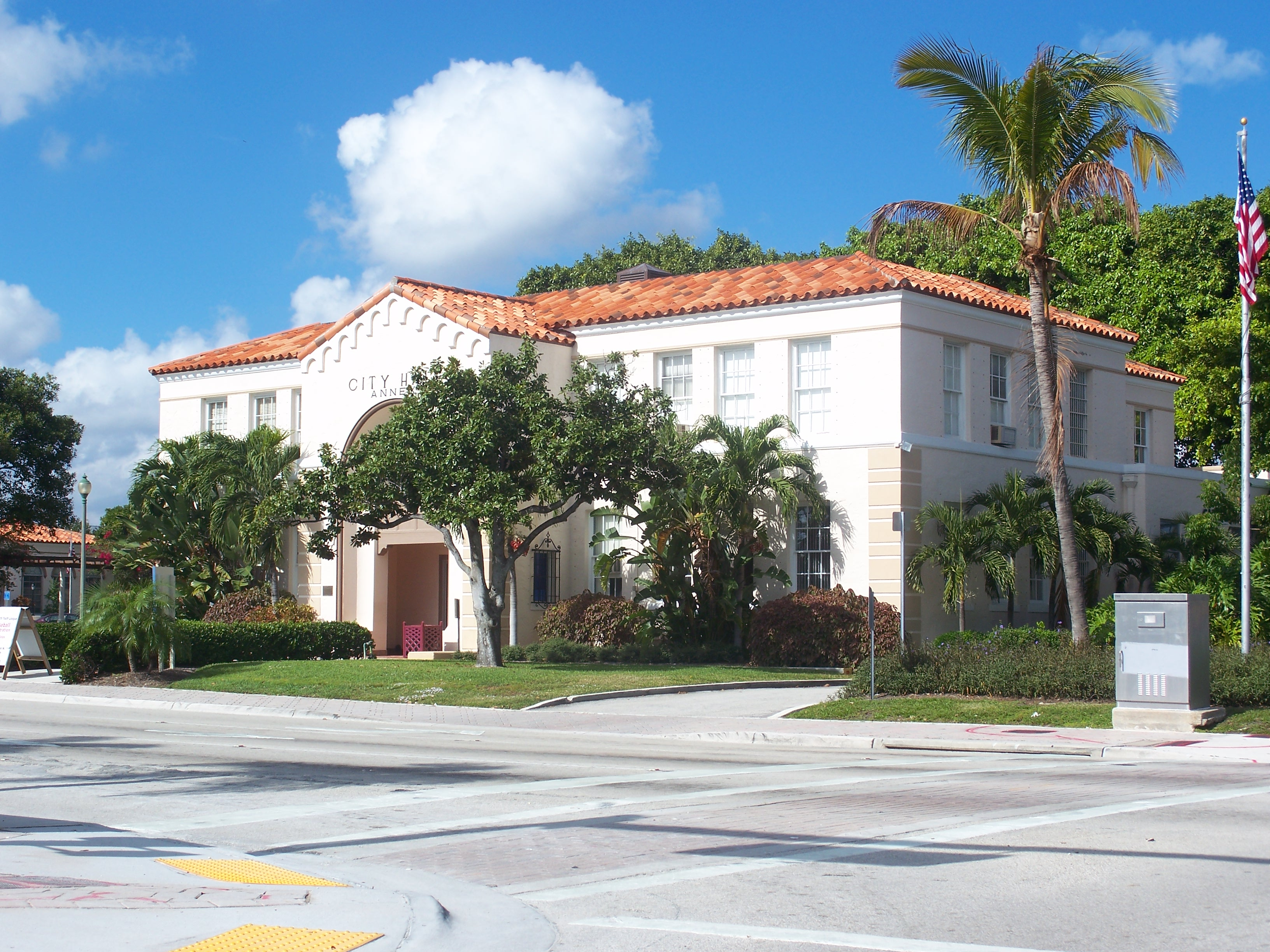

- Location within Florida Location within the United States
- Location: Lake Worth Beach, Florida
- Coordinates: 26°36′57″N 80°3′18″W
- Architectural style: Mission/Spanish Revival
- NRHP reference No.: 89000432
- Added to NRHP: May 18, 1989

The Old Lake Worth City Hall, also known as the Lake Worth City Hall Annex, is a historic site in Lake Worth Beach, Florida. It is located at 414 Lake Avenue.

The building originally served as an elementary school until June 1928. North Grade and South Grade Elementary Schools opened the following fall. The building was subsequently remodeled to provide for the Commission Chamber and administrative offices. On May 18, 1989, it was added to the U.S. National Register of Historic Places.

The Lake Worth Historical Museum is located on the second floor, and features antiques, tools, clothing, photographs, and other local and historic artifacts.

== History ==
With a quickly growing population in the 1910s, the city of Lake Worth recognized the need for a school. After the Palm Beach Farms Company donated land to the Palm Beach County Board of Public Instruction, a small, wood-frame schoolhouse was built in 1912, with Lucerne Avenue located to the north, Lake Avenue to the south, and Federal Highway to the east. Upon opening on October 20, 1912, 24 students were enrolled, which nearly doubled by the end of the school year. The expanding population soon necessitated the need for a larger schoolhouse, with the school board commissioning design plans and construction in 1914, to be funded by an approved $25,000 bond. The new, two story schoolhouse included 12 classrooms, each of which contained either 36 large desks or 45 small desks. After the construction of other schools, such as Lake Worth Community High School in 1922, the city government purchased the building in August 1926 due to its need for space for administrative functions.

The building was renovated after being sold to the city government, with classrooms being converted into offices and a telephone being installed. In July 1927, the former schoolhouse was rededicated as city hall. Lake Worth was devastated by the effects of the 1928 Okeechobee hurricane, including city hall. Along the northwest corner of the building, the exterior wall in its entirety collapsed, while the north tower was destroyed and the bay at the northeastern side of the building was removed. The roof suffered complete destruction. As a result, Lake Worth was without a functional center for city government. City hall operations were temporarily moved to the Lauriston Building, then located at the corner of Lake Avenue and Dixie Highway. In late 1928, architect Floyd King drew up plans for restoring city hall. Upon completion of restoration in 1929, the building featured a Mission–Spanish Revival design, a radical change from the previous architectural style.

Administrative functions for the city government resumed after the building reopened in 1929. The building continued to be used for city hall operations until April 1973, when nearly all local government departments – with the exception of the electrical and water utilities – moved to the civic center building along Dixie Highway between Lake Avenue and Lucerne Avenue. In 1980, the Lake Worth Historical Museum opened on the second floor; it features antiques, tools, clothing, photographs, and other local artifacts relating to the history of Lake Worth. The building was added to the National Register of Historic Places on May 18, 1989.

== See also ==
- National Register of Historic Places listings in Palm Beach County, Florida
- Old Lucerne Historic Residential District - A nearby historic district
