= College Park Historic District (Lake Worth Beach, Florida) =

Historic district in Florida, United States

- U.S. National Register of Historic Places
- U.S. Historic district
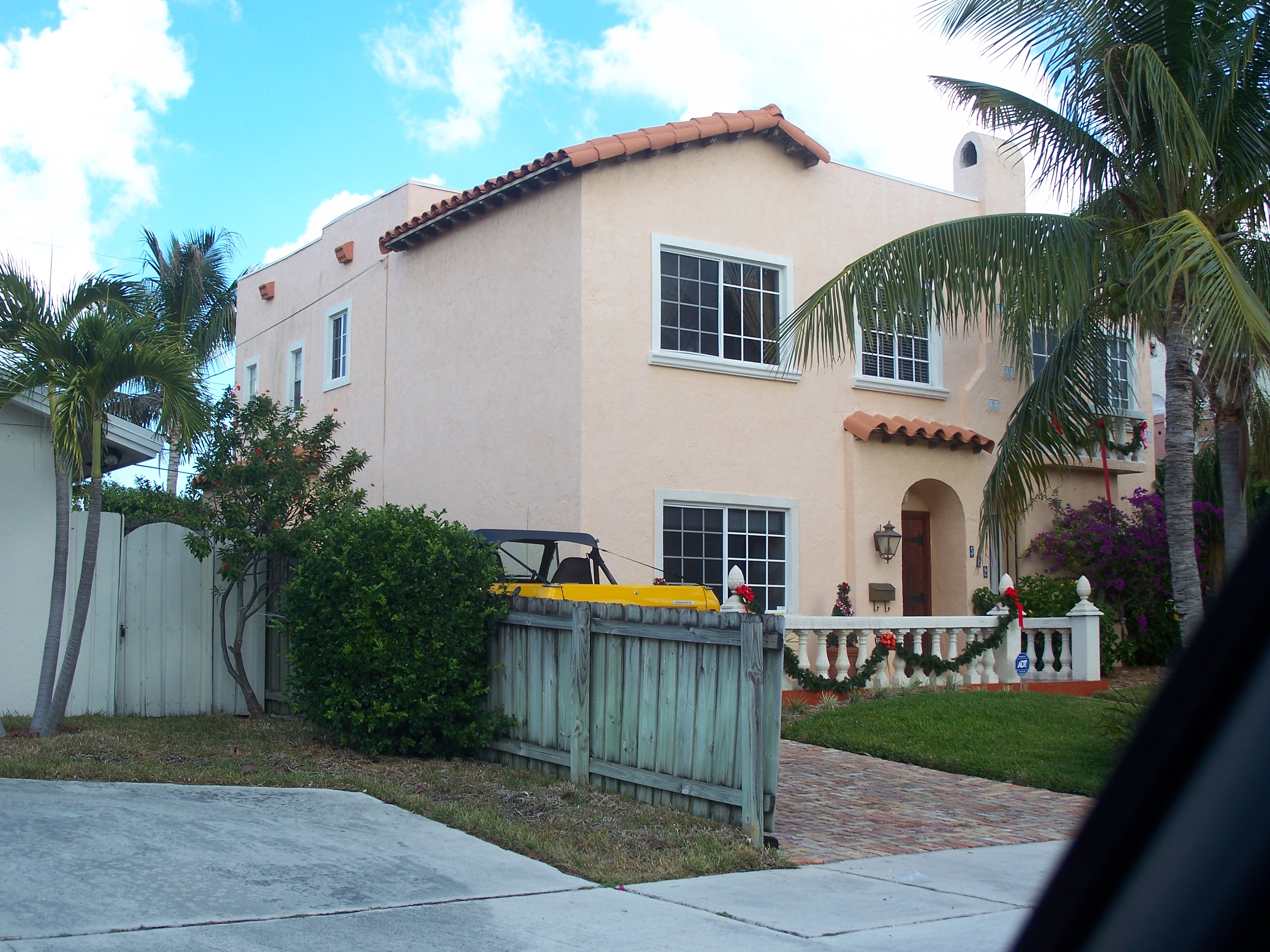
- A Mission style home in the district

- Location within Florida Location within the United States
- Location: Lake Worth Beach, Florida
- Coordinates: 26°38′27.65″N 80°3′15.88″W
- Area: 220 acres (0.89 km^{2})
- NRHP reference No.: 01000078
- Added to NRHP: February 9, 2001

The College Park Historic District is a residential historic district located in Lake Worth Beach, Florida, United States, that was designated on February 9, 2001. The district is bounded by the northern halves of Columbia Drive and Wellesley Drive to the north and south, respectively; North Federal Highway (SR 5) to the east; and North Dixie Highway (U.S. Route 1) to the west. It contains primarily single-family homes of various styles built mostly between the 1920s and 1960s. The latitudinal streets of the district are named for prominent U.S. colleges and universities.
