= Olympia School =

- U.S. National Register of Historic Places
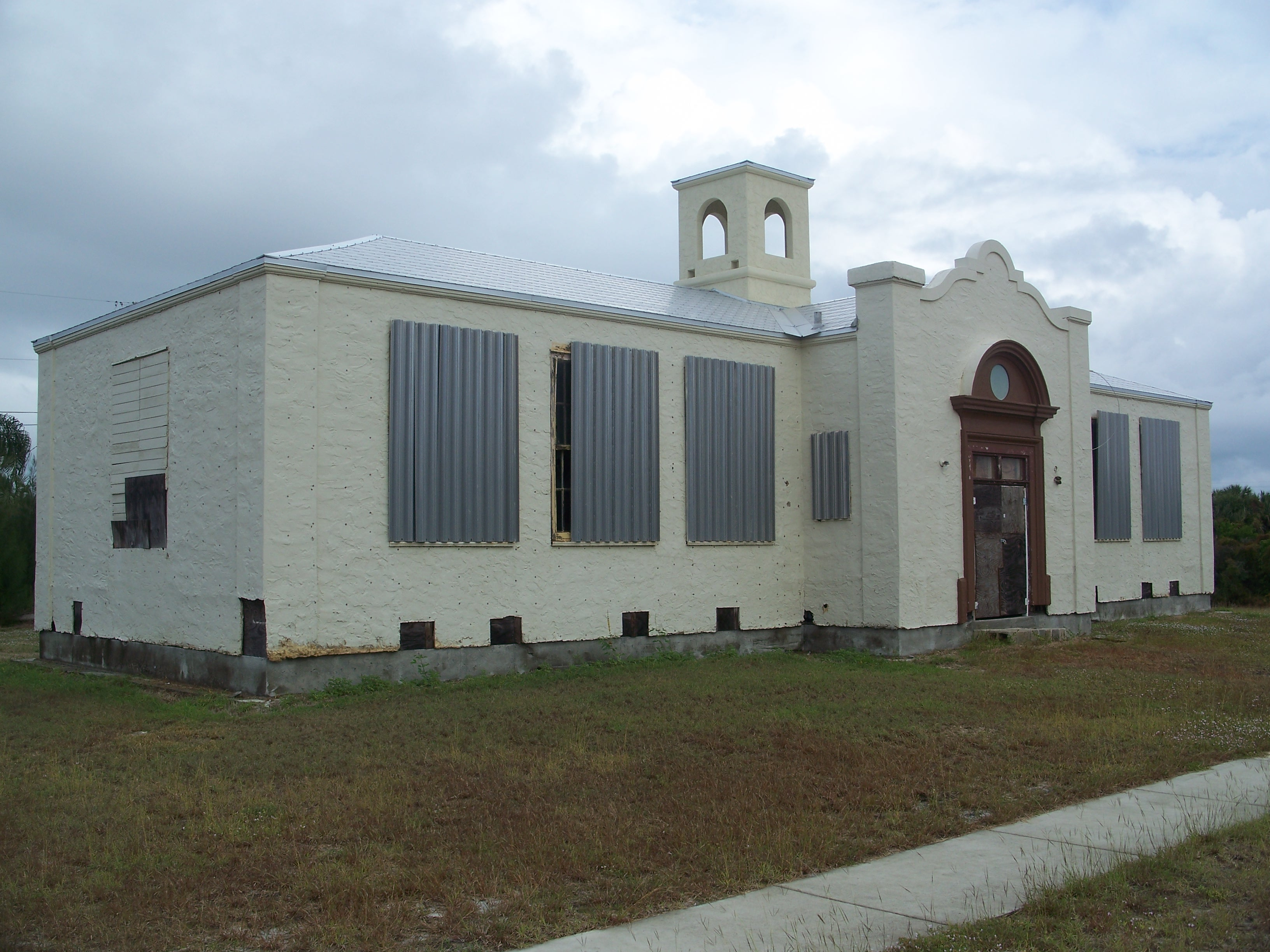

- Location within Florida Location within the United States
- Location: 9141 SE Apollo St., Hobe Sound, Florida
- Coordinates: 27°03′35″N 80°07′53″W
- Built: 1925
- Architect: Fatio, Mario; Treanor and Fatio
- Architectural style: Mission/Spanish Revival
- NRHP reference No.: 02001534
- Added to NRHP: December 20, 2002

The Olympia School, also known as the Picture City School, the Hobe Sound White School, the Apollo Street School and now the Apollo School, is a historic two-room elementary school building located at 9141 Southeast Apollo Street in Hobe Sound, Martin County, Florida. On December 20, 2002, it was added to the U.S. National Register of Historic Places. The school closed in 1963 upon the opening of the Hobe Sound Elementary School on Gomez Avenue. It was constructed in 1924, according to a Martin County Historical Society marker. At various times during the 2000s and 2010s, the school underwent restoration work.

== History and description ==
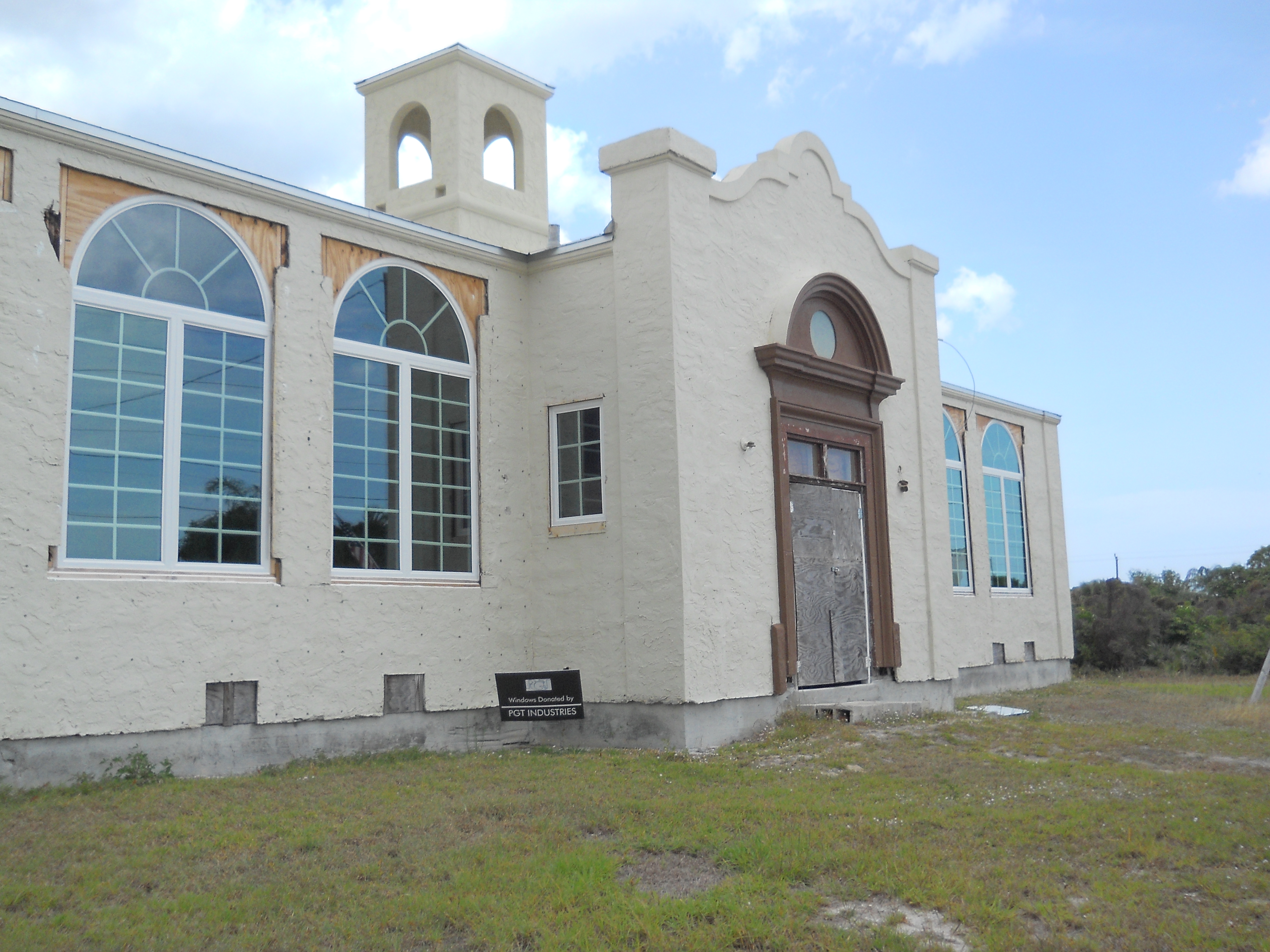
March 31, 2012 view

While non-indigenous settlement of Hobe Sound dates back to the 19th century, modern-day Martin County did not grow rapidly because Henry Flagler was not involved in its development. A post office opened at Hobe Sound in 1891. Nevertheless, during the 1920s Florida land boom, Hobe Sound was chosen by Lewis J. Selznick and Joseph Schenck of New York as the location for Picture City, a potential new site for the moving picture industry. The project plan for the townsite, known as Olympia, called for the construction of 585 structures and the naming of roads after Greek gods, which surrounded Zeus Park.

According to a Martin County Historical Society marker, the schoolhouse was constructed in 1924. By the following year, 20 dwellings and the Olympia School had been completed. Olympia Improvement Company president Malcolm Meacham hired Treanor and Fatio to construct the schoolhouse and Mario and Fatio to design it, a single-story Mission Revival-style building with two rooms. Additionally, the structure became one of the first elementary schools in Martin County. Because Olympia lacked a place of worship at the time, a church conducted services inside the school in 1926 and remained there until the mid-1930s.

Janet G. Murphy, Lee Williams, Jr., and Carl Shiver of the Florida Bureau of Historic Preservation noted that "for a short time, Picture City appeared to be a success." However, the Florida land boom ended in 1926 due to news of real estate fraud and then a destructive hurricane in Miami. Picture City Homes, Inc. then sold much of its holding to the Olympia Improvement Company at significantly reduced prices, though Olympia Development Company itself later faced foreclosures. The 1928 Okeechobee hurricane and the Great Depression then ended any hopes of Picture City/Olympia project recovering. That storm shattered several windows at the Olympia School.

Due to Jim Crow laws, the Olympia School became known as the Hobe Sound White School in the early 1930s. At the time, the school had only two teachers, and no more could be added due to the school board facing significant financial problems. In 1939, the school received new paint and a new roof, the latter costing about $230. The school closed in 1963 upon the opening of the Hobe Sound Elementary School on Gomez Avenue. On December 20, 2002, it was added to the U.S. National Register of Historic Places. At various times in the 2000s and 2010s, the school underwent restoration work. The building has been known by several names, including the Olympia School, Picture City School, Hobe Sound White School, Apollo Street School, and currently the Apollo School.

== See also ==
- National Register of Historic Places listings in Martin County, Florida
