= Hurricane of 1928 African-American Mass Burial Site =

Historic site in Palm Beach County, Florida

- U.S. National Register of Historic Places
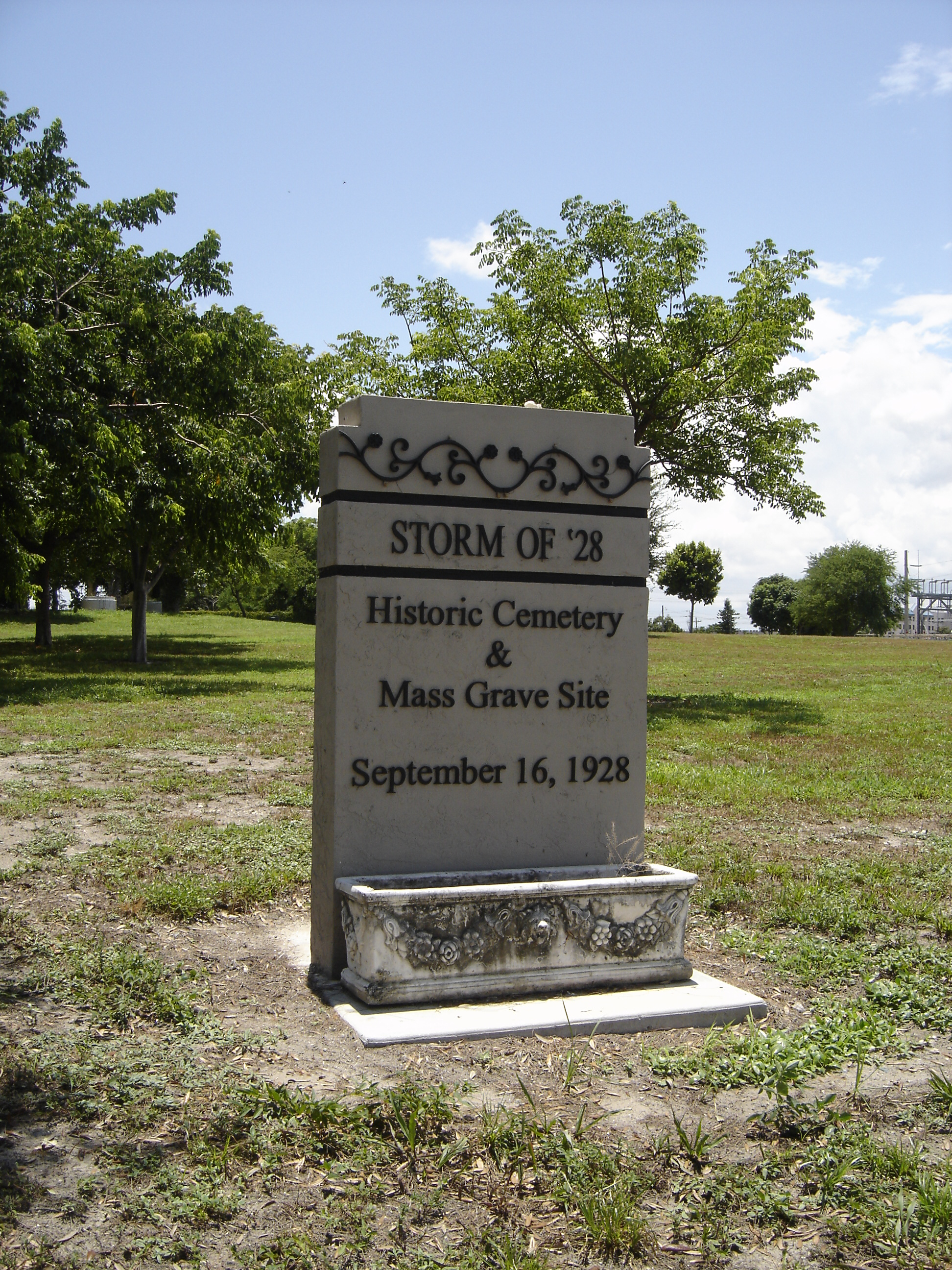

- Location within Florida Location within the United States
- Location: West Palm Beach, Florida
- Coordinates: 26°44′11″N 80°03′43″W
- NRHP reference No.: 02001012
- Added to NRHP: September 12, 2002

The Hurricane of 1928 African-American Mass Burial Site (also known as Pauper's Cemetery) is a pauper's cemetery and mass grave in West Palm Beach, Florida. It is listed on the U.S. National Register of Historic Places. The cemetery is situated near the junction of 25th Street and Tamarind Avenue between I-95 and U.S. Route 1. The site is the location in which 674 bodies of African Americans or those of an unknown race were buried following the 1928 Okeechobee hurricane, while most of the white victims of the storm received a proper burial at Woodlawn Cemetery due to segregation laws.

Established in 1913, the property of the pauper's cemetery currently includes approximately 1.03 acres (0.42 ha) of land. Although the site is located at the southwest corner of 25th Street and Tamarind Avenue, 25th Street was paved above the northern portion of the mass grave in the 1950s, unearthing a number of bodies in the process.

After the 1928 hurricane, the bodies buried at that location became mostly forgotten by the public. The city of West Palm Beach sold the land and it changed ownership several times into the 1980s. Beginning in 1991, a movement to convince the city of West Palm Beach to repurchase the property began, which succeeded in December 2000. On September 12, 2002, it was added to the US National Register of Historic Places.

== Design ==
The Hurricane of 1928 African-American Mass Burial Site is located in West Palm Beach, Florida, at the southwest corner of the intersection of 25th Street and Tamarind Avenue. Originally, the pauper's cemetery was composed of approximately 12 acres (4.9 ha), but portions of the property were sold. Additionally, 25th Street was redirected to pass through the cemetery. The property today contains about 1.03 acres (0.42 ha) of land. The property is dotted with several pillars reading "1928" and a historical marker, which was erected in 2003. There are also sidewalks, trees, and benches.

The bodies were buried in two layers in a now completely fence-enclosed 40 by 80 feet (12 by 24 m) area, which is located near the northeast corner of the pauper's cemetery, close to 25th Street and about 145 ft (44 m) west of Tamarind Avenue. However, the parcel of land containing the bodies extended farther north prior to the 25th Street, which moved southeastward-to-northwestward until becoming an east-to-west street in the 1950s. A larger fence, approximately 40 by 176 ft (12 by 54 m), surrounds the inner fence and mass burial parcel.

== History ==
=== Establishment of the cemetery and 1928 hurricane ===
In 1913, the city of West Palm Beach set aside land for cemeteries. Three acres each were reserved for a Palm Beach County pauper's cemetery, a city pauper's cemetery, a pest house, and a pauper's house – 12 acres (4.9 ha) in total. The city pauper cemetery, the future location of the mass burial site, was located at the southwest corner of Tamarind Avenue and 25th Street, which moved northwest to southeast at the time. In 1917, the county established a pauper's cemetery near the present-day intersection of 45th Street and Australian Avenue. However, a portion of the property was sold to a slaughterhouse in 1917.

The 1928 Okeechobee hurricane caused at least 2,500 deaths, most of which were migrant, black farmer workers around Lake Okeechobee. Due to racial segregation at the time, the coffins provided were used for the white victims, most of whom received a proper burial at Woodlawn Cemetery in West Palm Beach. The bodies of the black people who were killed, and some of those whose race could not be identified, were disposed of by other means. Some were burned in funeral pyres, while many were placed into mass graves, including about 1,600 in Port Mayaca, 674 at the pauper's cemetery in West Palm Beach, at least 22 in Miami Locks (now known as Lake Harbor), 28 in Ortona, and 22 in Sebring. There were also unconfirmed reports of bodies buried in Loxahatchee. After the burials were complete, then-Mayor of West Palm Beach Vincent Oaksmith proclaimed an hour of mourning on October 1 for those who died during the storm. A funeral service was hosted by several local clergymen. Roughly 3,000 people attended, including educator and civil rights activist Mary McLeod Bethune. A memorial was placed at Woodlawn Cemetery in memory of the victims of the storm, but no such marker was placed at the pauper's cemetery.

=== After the hurricane ===
Those buried were largely forgotten, despite reports of human remains resurfacing over the years, including during the rerouting of 25th Street in the 1950s, which resulted in the unearthing of several bodies. In 1957, the city of West Palm Beach sold a section of the burial grounds to a sewage disposal plant, but the property changed ownership again in the 1980s when the city exchanged the land for property on 23rd street, just to the south of the grounds and where a church was located. After some deed restrictions were lifted in 1985, the church sold the land to Palm Beach Exterminating owner Bernard Kolkana, who was planning the construction of a warehouse on the property. Unaware of the mass burial, Kolkana purchased the land for $175,000 in 1987, a year before his son, Jim, bought the land for $230,000.

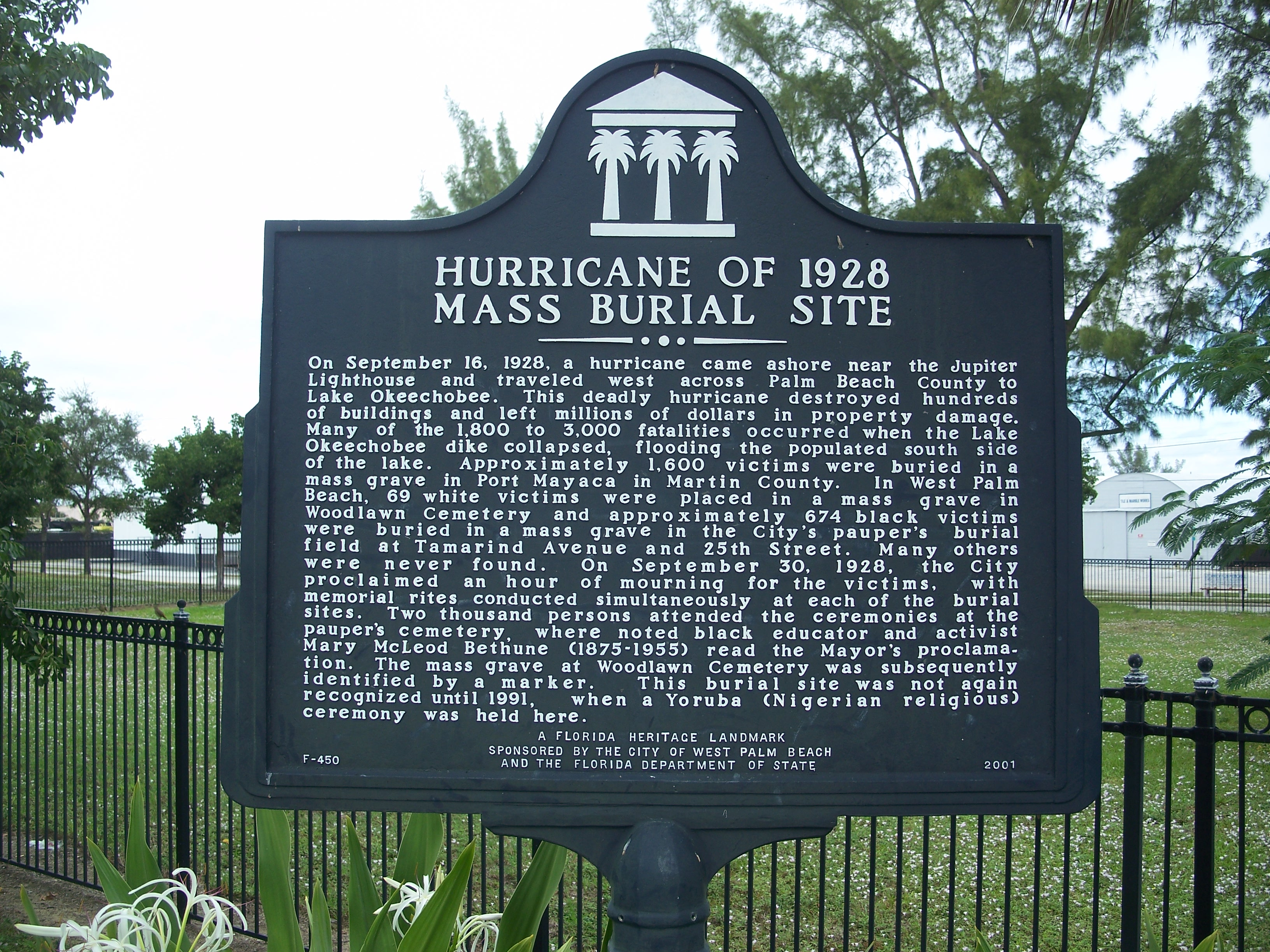
The historical marker added in 2003

The public remained mostly unaware of mass burials on the site until the 1990s, until the Sankofa Society conducted a well-publicized blessing ceremony in 1991. Kolkana refused to sell or donate the land back to the city of West Palm Beach, but halted any plans for construction on the property. In 1992, city work crews located human remains on the property using a backhoe. The bones were reburied, but their locations were marked. Resident Robert Hazard established the Storm of '28 Memorial Park Coalition in 1999 as a non-profit organization used to reacquire the land and solicit donations for a memorial complex. The complex was originally intended to include an educational center and a museum about African-American pioneers and migrant farm workers, at a cost of approximately $6.1 million. Organizations such as the Sankofa Society proposed a less sophisticated plan of erecting an information wall and a large marble headstone, at a far less expensive cost of about $43,000.

In 2000, a Miami-based technology company was hired by the city of West Palm Beach to conduct a ground-penetrating radar survey covering a 200 ft (61 m) by 200 ft (61 m) area. The team performed the assessment with a subsurface interface radar, which was used to determine the locations of the bodies. The report of the survey indicated that a 70 ft (21 m) by 30 ft (9.1 m) trench was dug for disposal of the bodies, however the extension of 25th street "unearthed random bodies from the old pauper's cemetery, and it ran right through the north end of the mass grave trench." Additionally, according to the survey, the bodies were buried in two layers.

=== Re-acquisition by the city of West Palm Beach ===
City Commissioner Alfred Zucaro urged then-West Palm Beach mayor Joel T. Daves III in September 2000 to reacquire the land using eminent domain. This would allow the city to receive the land for its appraised value of only $1,000 without consent from Kolkana. On September 11, four of the five city commissioners – Jim Exline, Ike Robinson, Bill Moss, and Zucaro – voted in approval of eminent domain after failures to negotiate with Kolkana and accusations of racism. The fifth commissioner, Mary Brandenburg, was absent. The city commissioners reversed their positions December 11, 2000, after negotiating with Kolkana to purchase the land for $180,000. Thereafter, plans for construction of a memorial began. The site was designated a US National Registered Historic Place on September 12, 2002. During the 75th anniversary of the storm's landfall in September 2003, a historical marker was added by the City of West Palm Beach.

== See also ==
- List of Florida hurricanes (1900–49)
- National Register of Historic Places listings in Palm Beach County, Florida
- Racial segregation in the United States
