= Eliot Kleinberg =

Eliot Kleinberg is an author and a retired (December 2020) news and features writer for the Palm Beach Post in Palm Beach County, Florida.

Born in Coral Gables, Florida, Kleinberg grew up in South Florida and received two degrees from the University of Florida. He was a reporter for The Dallas Morning News from 1984 through 1987, when he returned to Florida and joined the Palm Beach Post. He has written extensively about many different aspects of Florida, and is most notable for his books Weird Florida and Weird Florida II, and Black Cloud, a history of the great 1928 Okeechobee Hurricane. His first work of fiction is Peace River, a historical novel set during the Civil War. In 2026, he published Hypocrite's Row, the first in a series of mysteries featuring Roaring Twenties Miami police detective Nate Moran. The second installment, The Treasure of Indian Key, is set for publication in early 2027. He also publishes a blog about bad writing, and how to fix it, called "Something Went Horribly Wrong."

== Bibliography ==
- Pioneers in Paradise: West Palm Beach, the First 100 Years
- Florida Fun Facts
- Historical Traveler's Guide to Florida
- Weird Florida
- War in Paradise: Stories of World War II in Florida
- Our Century (Palm Beach Post staff)
- Black Cloud: The Deadly Hurricane of 1928
- Weird Florida II: In a State of Shock
- Palm Beach Past: The Best of Post Time
- Wicked Palm Beach: Lifestyles of the Rich and Heinous
- Palm Beach County at 100 (Palm Beach Post staff)
