= Chosen, Florida =

Ghost town in Palm Beach County, Florida

Chosen is a ghost town in Palm Beach County, Florida near Belle Glade, Florida and Lake Okeechobee. The deadly 1928 Okeechobee hurricane devastated the area.

== History ==
The Mayaimi established mounds in the area. Chosen was established in 1921 as a religious haven for members of the Church of the Brethren. A town was established by J. R. (John Robert) Leatherman, a Christian pietist Dunkard from Virginia. A school was established in 1921.

Alan Lomax and Zora Neale Hurston planned to visit the area during a recording expedition.

Isaac W. West was nominated to be postmaster.

== Legacy ==
A historical marker commemorates the community.

== See also ==
- List of ghost towns in Florida
