= Picture City, Florida =

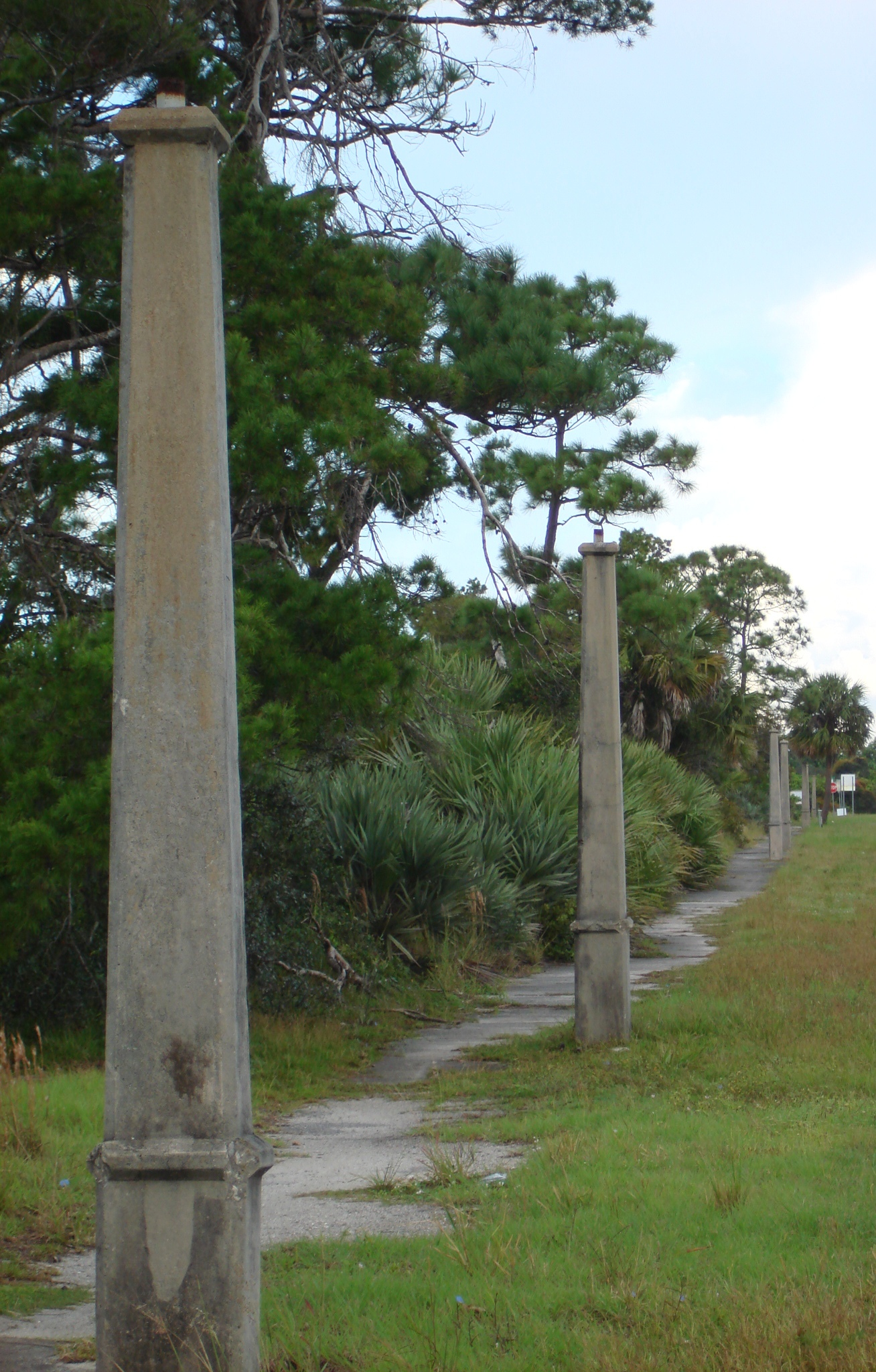
Cement streetlights that are still standing from the 1920s in Hobe Sound along A1A.

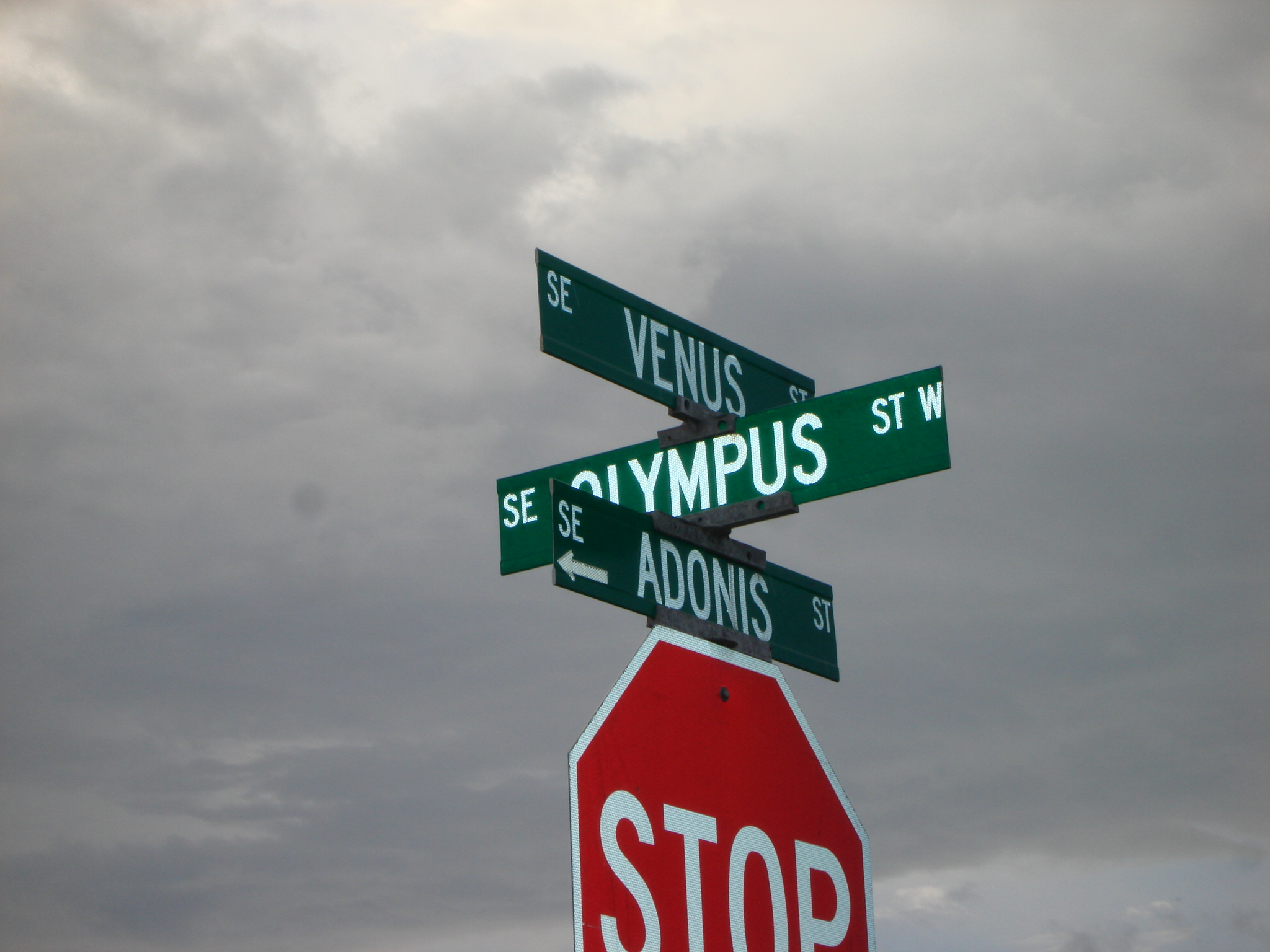
Street signs showing the names of the roads during the proposed Picture City era of the 1920s in Hobe Sound.

Picture City was a planned community in Hobe Sound, Florida, intended to be centered around the cinema industry. During the land boom of the 1920s, the Olympia Improvement Company announced elaborate plans for Hobe Sound. Its goal was to create a town, in Greek style, where motion pictures could be produced. Street names bore the Greek theme with names such as Zeus, Saturn, Mercury, Mars, Olympus, Pluto and Athena. For a brief time Hobe Sound was renamed "Picture City" and plans were presented for a movie picture production center, very similar to Hollywood, California. The boom collapsed after the 1928 Okeechobee hurricane and the original name was restored. Street names remained, however, as did the concrete streetlight posts along Dixie Highway.

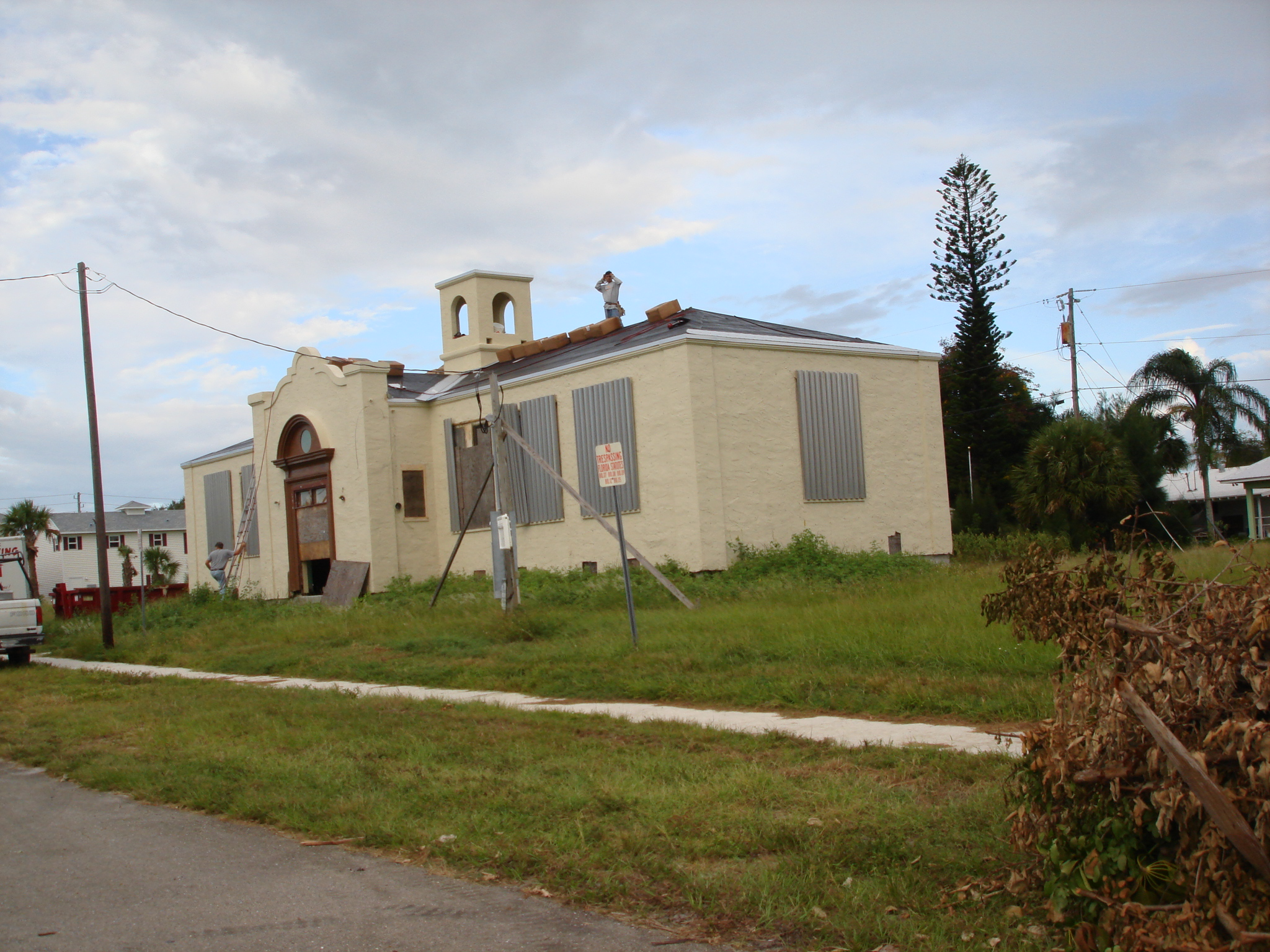
Renovations of the old Olympia/Apollo School.

In 1924, the building which soon would become the new schoolhouse in Hobe Sound was constructed. The Martin County Board of Public Instruction secured the use of the new school building from the Picture City Corporation in 1925. In October of that year, the Olympia School opened. The school was designated the “Picture City School” of Martin County. It remained in use as a school until 1962. There is currently local interest in restoring the school, now known as the Apollo School.

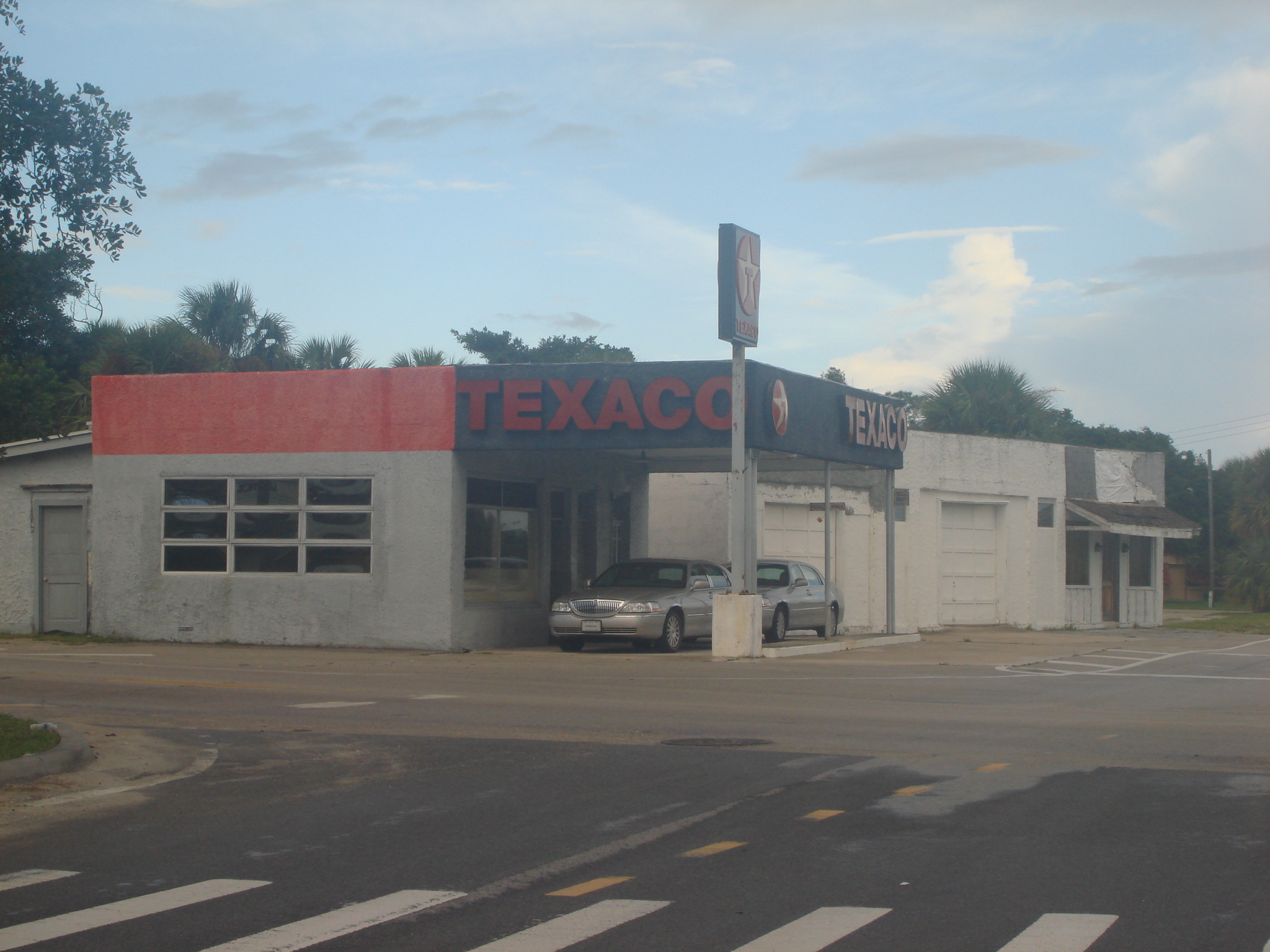
The old Texaco station located on A1A just west of the railroad tracks.

Other mementos of the past are gone, including the ice plant, which was south of Bridge Road, and the old train station, which now, refurbished and relocated west of Hobe Sound, Florida, serves as an office building for Becker Groves and the Texaco station east of the Winn-Dixie plaza.

== Sources ==
- History, by Hobe Sound Chamber of Commerce
