= 1928 Okeechobee hurricane =

Category 5 Atlantic hurricane

Hurricane Four 1928 Okeechobee hurricane San Felipe Segundo hurricane
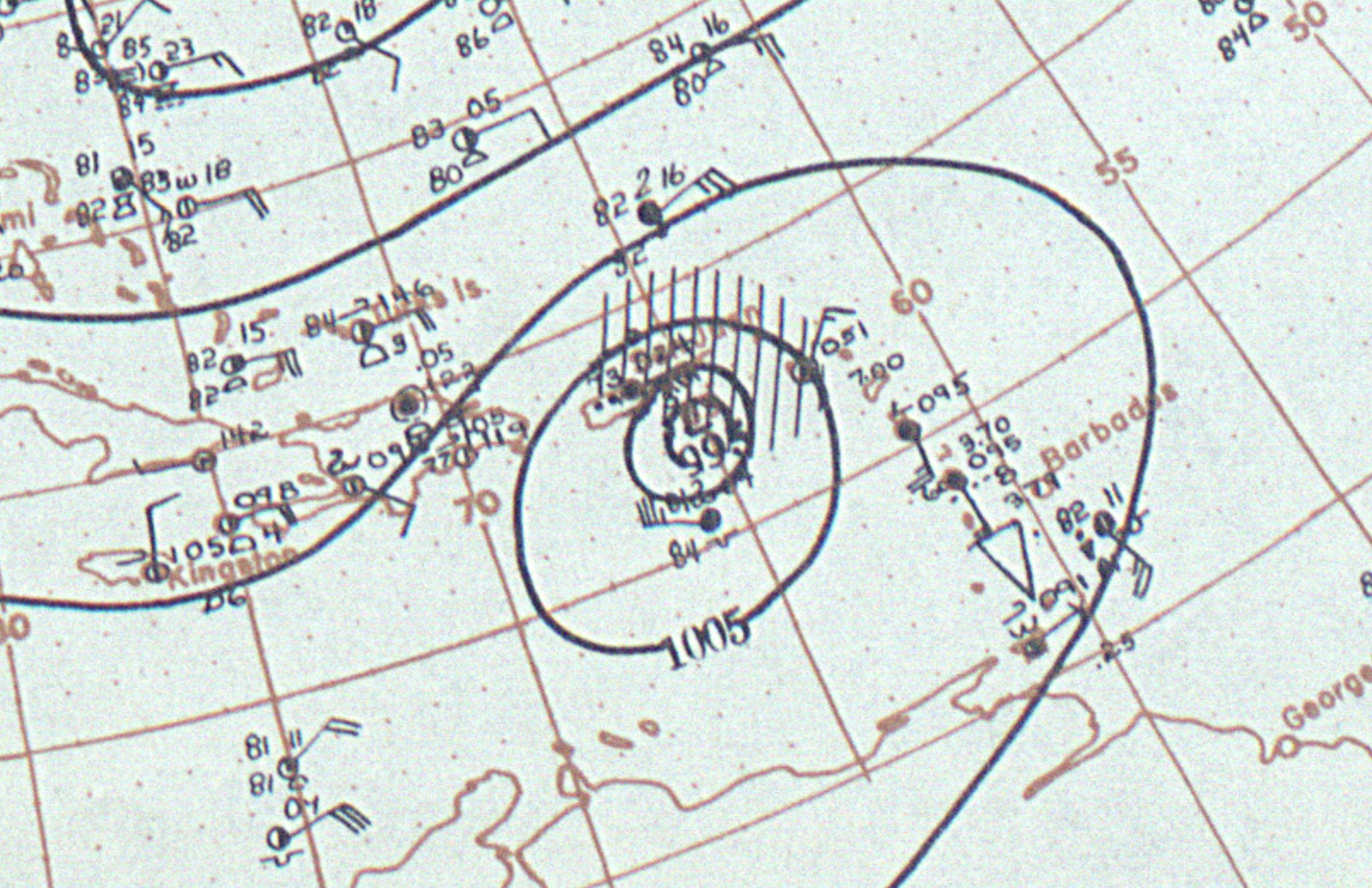
- Surface weather analysis of the hurricane nearing landfall in Puerto Rico at peak intensity on September 13

Meteorological history
- Formed: September 6, 1928
- Dissipated: September 21, 1928

Category 5 major hurricane
- 1-minute sustained (SSHWS/NWS)
- Highest winds: 160 mph (260 km/h)
- Lowest pressure: ≤929 mbar (hPa); ≤27.43 inHg

Overall effects
- Fatalities: 4,114+
- Damage: $100 million (1928 USD) ($1.88 billion in 2018)
- Areas affected: West Africa; Portuguese Cape Verde; Guadeloupe; Virgin Islands; Puerto Rico; British Bahamas; East Coast of the United States
- IBTrACS
- Part of the 1928 Atlantic hurricane season

The Okeechobee hurricane of 1928, also known as the San Felipe Segundo hurricane and Florida's Forgotten Storm, was one of the deadliest hurricanes in the recorded history of the North Atlantic basin, and the fourth deadliest hurricane in the United States, only behind the 1900 Galveston hurricane, 1899 San Ciriaco hurricane, and Hurricane Maria in 2017.

The hurricane killed an estimated 2,500 people in the United States; most of the fatalities occurred in the state of Florida, particularly around Lake Okeechobee. It was the fourth tropical cyclone, third hurricane, and only major hurricane of the 1928 Atlantic hurricane season, and remains the deadliest disaster in Florida's history to date. It developed off the west coast of Africa on September 6 as a tropical depression, but it strengthened into a tropical storm later that day, shortly before passing south of the Cape Verde islands. Further intensification was slow and halted late on September 7. About 48 hours later, the storm strengthened and became a Category 1 hurricane on the Saffir–Simpson hurricane wind scale. Still moving westward, the system reached Category 4 intensity before striking Guadeloupe on September 12, where it brought great destruction and resulted in 1,200 deaths. The islands of Martinique, Montserrat, and Nevis also reported damage and fatalities, but not nearly as severe as in Guadeloupe.

Around midday on September 13, the storm strengthened into a Category 5 hurricane and peaked with sustained winds of 160 mph (260 km/h). About six hours later, the system made landfall in Puerto Rico; it remains the only tropical cyclone on record to strike the island at Category 5 intensity. Very strong winds resulted in severe damage in Puerto Rico; 24,728 homes were destroyed and 192,444 were damaged throughout the island, leaving over 500,000 people homeless. Heavy rainfall also led to extreme damage to vegetation and agriculture. On Puerto Rico alone, there were 312 deaths and about US$50 million ($938 million today) in damage. While crossing the island and emerging into the Atlantic, the storm weakened slightly, falling to Category 4 intensity. It began crossing through the Bahamas on September 16, where it resulted in 18 fatalities.

The storm made landfall near West Palm Beach, Florida, early on September 17, with winds of 145 mph (233 km/h). In the city, more than 1,711 homes were destroyed; the effects were most severe around Lake Okeechobee. The storm surge caused water to pour out of the southern edge of the lake, flooding hundreds of square miles to depths as great as 20 feet (6.1 m). Numerous houses and buildings were swept away in the cities of Belle Glade, Canal Point, Chosen, Pahokee, and South Bay, Florida. At least 2,500 people drowned, while damage was estimated at $25 million ($469 million today). The system weakened significantly while crossing Florida, falling to Category 1 intensity late on September 17. It curved north-northeast and briefly emerged into the Atlantic on September 18, but soon made another landfall near Edisto Island, South Carolina, with winds of 85 mph (137 km/h). Early on the following day, the system weakened to a tropical storm and became an extratropical cyclone over North Carolina hours later. Overall, the hurricane caused $100 million in damage ($1875 million today) and killed at least 4,114 people.

== Meteorological history ==
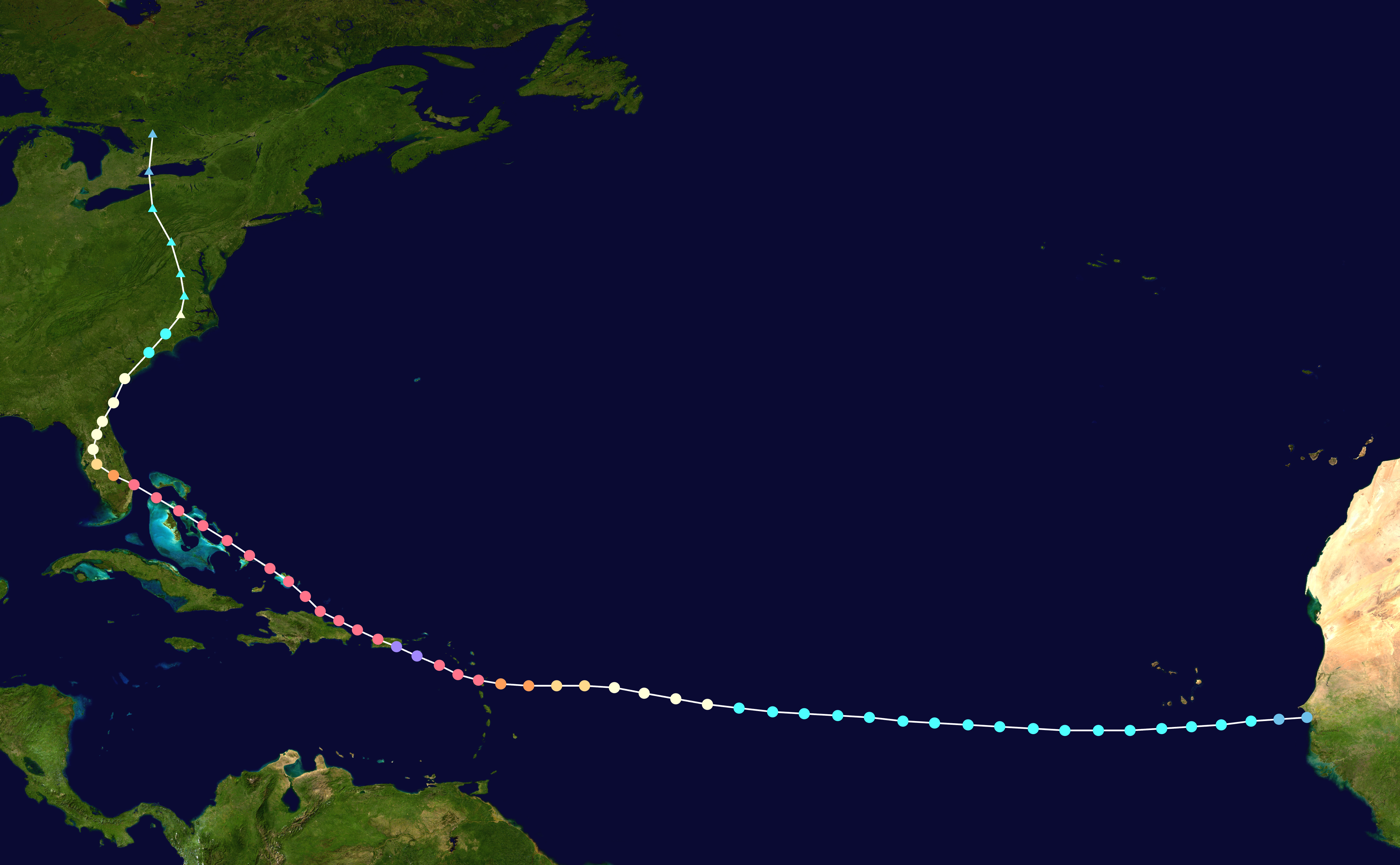
Map plotting the storm's track and intensity, according to the Saffir–Simpson scale Map key Saffir–Simpson scale Tropical depression (≤38 mph, ≤62 km/h) Tropical storm (39–73 mph, 63–118 km/h) Category 1 (74–95 mph, 119–153 km/h) Category 2 (96–110 mph, 154–177 km/h) Category 3 (111–129 mph, 178–208 km/h) Category 4 (130–156 mph, 209–251 km/h) Category 5 (≥157 mph, ≥252 km/h) Unknown Storm type Tropical cyclone Subtropical cyclone Extratropical cyclone, remnant low, tropical disturbance, or monsoon depression

On September 6, ships reported a tropical depression developing just off the west coast of Africa near Dakar, Senegal. On the next day, a ship reported winds of 60 mph (97 km/h), or tropical storm status; on this basis, the Atlantic hurricane reanalysis project estimated that the system attained tropical storm status late on September 6. However, lack of observations for several days prevented the system from being classified in real time as it moved generally westward across the Atlantic Ocean. On September 10, the S.S. Commack first observed the storm about 900 mi (1,450 km) to the east of Guadeloupe, which at the time was the most easterly report of a tropical cyclone ever received through ship's radio. Later that day, two other ships confirmed the intensity of the storm, and the Hurricane Research Division estimated it strengthened into a hurricane at 18:00 UTC on September 10.

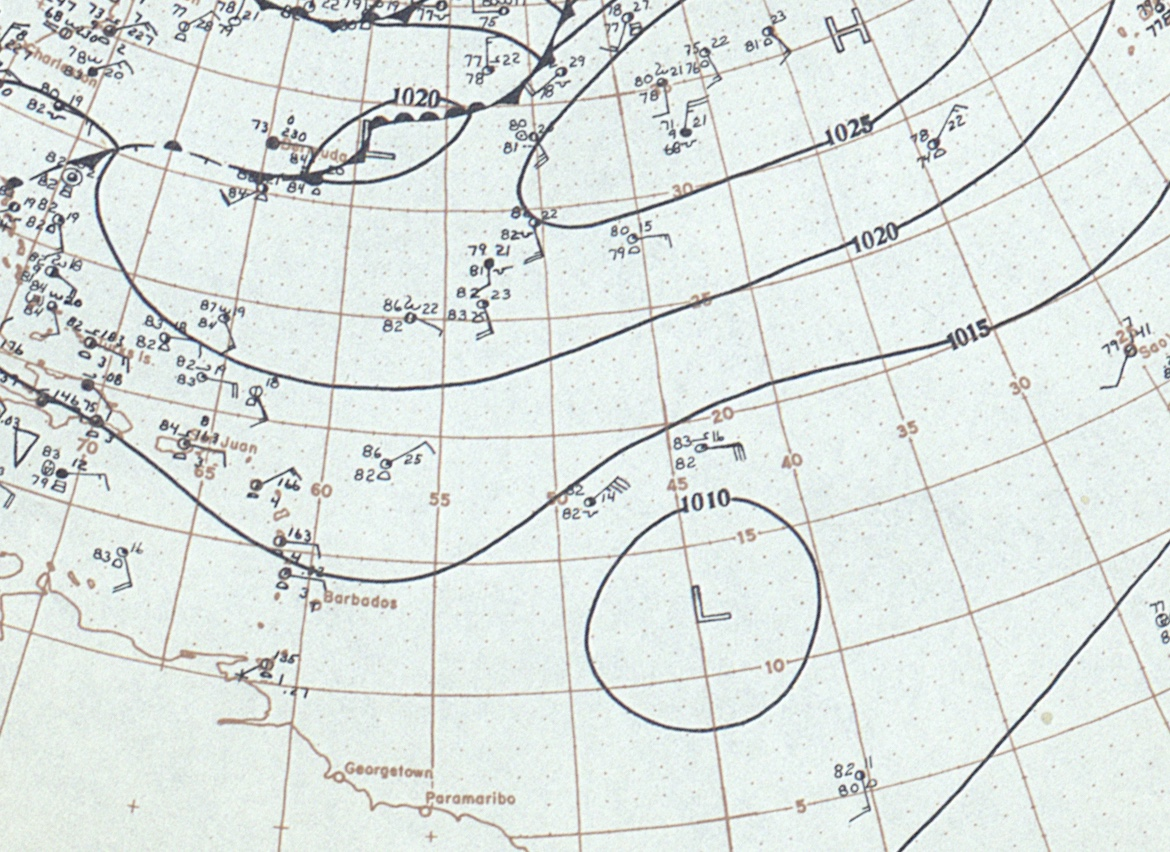
Synoptic weather map of the hurricane moving across the Atlantic Ocean on September 10

As the storm neared the Lesser Antilles, it continued to intensify. Between 17:30 and 18:30 UTC on September 12, the hurricane's eye moved over Guadeloupe with a barometric pressure of 940 mb (28 inHg), suggesting maximum sustained winds of 140 mph (230 km/h), or Category 4 intensity on the Saffir–Simpson scale. Continuing to the west-northwest, the hurricane passed about 10 mi (16 km) south of Saint Croix before approaching Puerto Rico. On September 13, the 15 mi (24 km) eye crossed Puerto Rico in eight hours from the southeast to the northwest, moving ashore near Guayama and exiting between Aguadilla and Isabela. A ship near the southern coast reported a pressure of 931 mbar (27.5 inHg), and the cup anemometer at San Juan reported sustained winds of 160 mph (257 km/h) before failing. As the wind station was 30 mi (48 km) north of the storm's center, winds near the landfall point were unofficially estimated as high as 200 mph (320 km/h). On this basis, the hurricane is believed to have made landfall in Puerto Rico as a Category 5 hurricane on the Saffir-Simpson scale, although there was uncertainty in the peak intensity, due to the large size and slow movement of the storm.

After emerging from Puerto Rico, the hurricane had weakened to winds of about 140 mph (230 km/h), based on a pressure reading of 941 mbar (27.8 inHg) at Isabela. The storm brushed the northern coast of Hispaniola while moving west-northwestward, gradually restrengthening. On September 15, it passed within 35 mi (56 km) of Grand Turk, by which time the winds increased to 155 mph (249 km/h). The storm continued through the Bahamas as a strong Category 4 hurricane, passing near Nassau at 10:00 UTC on September 16. Initially, Richard Gray of the U.S. Weather Bureau was optimistic that the storm would spare South Florida. However, at 00:00 UTC on September 17, the large hurricane made landfall in southeastern Florida near Palm Beach, with estimated winds of 145 mph (233 km/h). This was based on a pressure reading of 929 mbar (27.4 inHg) in the city, which at the time was the lowest pressure reading in the mainland United States; this broke the previous record of 935 mbar (27.6 inHg) set during the 1926 Miami hurricane. Peak gusts were estimated near 160 mph (260 km/h) at Canal Point.

The hurricane quickly weakened as it progressed inland and moved over Lake Okeechobee, although its large size enabled it to maintain hurricane status for several more days. Late on September 17, the hurricane recurved to the northeast and passed near Jacksonville early the next day with winds of 75 mph (121 km/h). At 08:00 UTC on September 18, the storm again reached open waters. Later that day, the hurricane restrengthened slightly over open waters, making a second United States landfall near Edisto Island, South Carolina, at 19:00 UTC with winds of 85 mph (137 km/h). Accelerating northeastward, the system quickly weakened into a tropical storm over North Carolina. On September 19, the storm transitioned into an extratropical cyclone, although it restrengthened slightly to hurricane strength, due to baroclinic forcing caused by a frontal system. The cyclone turned to the north-northwest, moving quickly through the eastern United States. On September 21, the former hurricane dissipated over Ontario, having merged with another disturbance.

== Effects ==
=== Leeward Islands ===
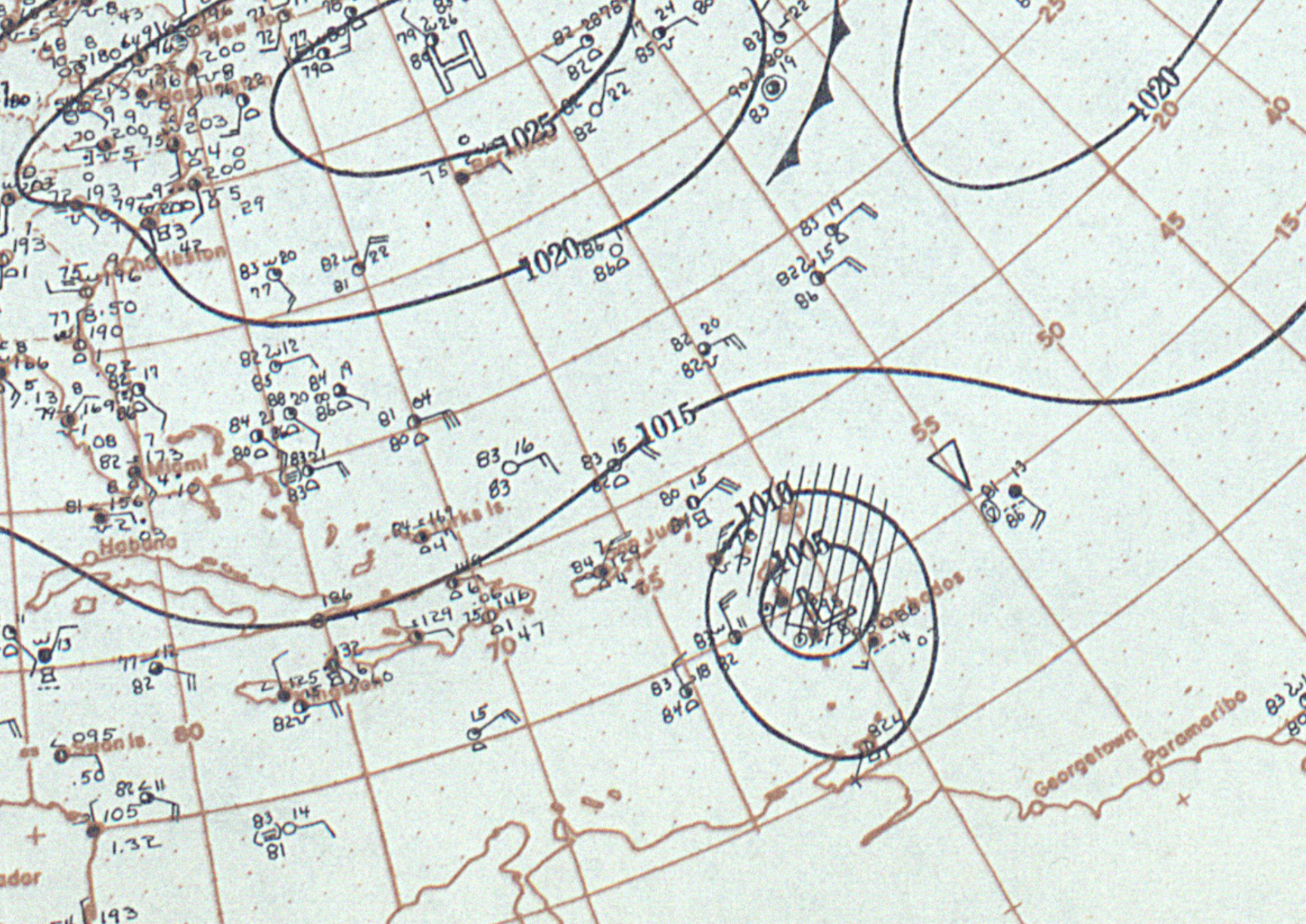
Map showing the hurricane approaching the Leeward Islands and nearing the island of Guadeloupe on September 12

The hurricane moved directly over the Leeward Islands in the Caribbean Sea, strengthening as it did so. On the island of Dominica, winds were clocked at 40 mph (64 km/h). One person perished, while the cyclone also damaged seawalls and ruined crops. In Martinique, further south of the storm's path, there were three deaths. Waves washed away homes along the island's northwest coast, although a report by Walter S. Reineck, U.S. Consul in Martinique, noted that the worst damage occurred to cocoa, lime, and sugarcane crops.

Guadeloupe received a direct hit from the storm, apparently with little warning; the death toll there was 1,200, and damage reports relayed through Paris indicated "great destruction" on the island.

About three-fourths of the island's residents were left homeless. In the community of Saint-François, the only structure to remain standing was the police station, which was built with reinforced concrete. To the east of the town, the merchant ship Albotros sank; it had been carrying 80 casks of rum. The crew and the five men attempting to save the ship drowned. Approximately 85%–95% of banana crops were destroyed, 70%–80% of tree crops suffered severe damage, and 40% of the sugar cane crop was ruined. The people struggled to survive both in the short and longer term after the storm.

Storm deaths by region
Region	Deaths	Locale	Deaths
Caribbean and Bahamas	1,601	Martinique	3
Caribbean and Bahamas	1,601	Guadeloupe	1,200
Caribbean and Bahamas	1,601	Montserrat	42
Caribbean and Bahamas	1,601	Dominica	1
Caribbean and Bahamas	1,601	Saint Kitts and Nevis	22
Caribbean and Bahamas	1,601	Puerto Rico	312
Caribbean and Bahamas	1,601	Turks and Caicos Islands	18
Caribbean and Bahamas	1,601	Bahamas	3
United States	2,511+	Florida	2,500+
United States	2,511+	Maryland	3
United States	2,511+	New Jersey	3
United States	2,511+	Pennsylvania	7
Total			4,114+

Montserrat, just north of the storm's center, was warned in advance of the storm but still suffered £150,000 (1928 UKP) in damages and 42 deaths; Plymouth and Salem were devastated, and crop losses caused near-starvation conditions before relief could arrive. All commercial and government buildings on the island were destroyed, as were more than 600 homes. Saint Kitts and Nevis also suffered heavily. On the island of Saint Kitts, a number of homes built on wooden foundations were demolished. Nine deaths were reported, six of which occurred in a schoolhouse collapse. Thirteen people were killed on the island of Nevis.

The storm destroyed hundreds of homes on Antigua, including a doctor's home and a "poor house". Government offices, hospitals, and school were also damaged. Saint Thomas reported sustained winds of about 90 mph (140 km/h). The hurricane demolished a new breakwater and several warehouses, ruined a naval yard, and capsized barges. Only minimal damage occurred on the nearby island of Saint John. On Saint Croix, nearly all of the island's 11,000 residents suffered some degree of loss. A total of 143 buildings were destroyed, including a sugar mill. The storm resulted in nine deaths on the island. Throughout the Virgin Islands, as many as 700,000 people were rendered homeless.

=== Puerto Rico ===
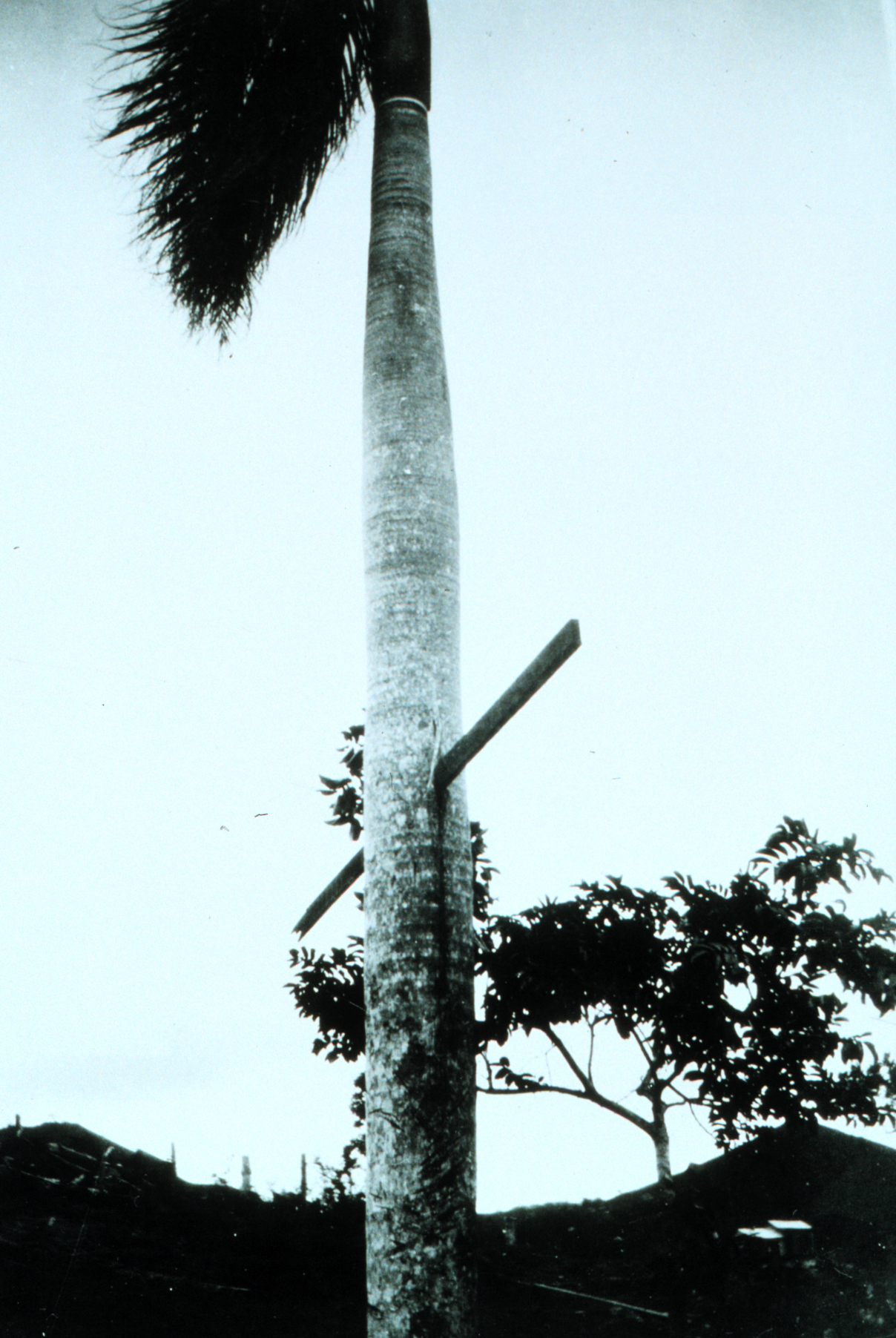
Hurricane-force winds drove this 10-foot (3.0 m) piece of 2x4 lumber through a palm tree in Puerto Rico

While the storm was passing near Dominica, the U.S. Weather Bureau located at San Juan, Puerto Rico, warned about the threat of the hurricane which would strike the island within a day or two. The advisory was sent via telegraph to 75 police districts and was broadcast from the naval radio station every two hours; this was the first hurricane warning broadcast by radio. Warnings were also posted for 12 ports along the southern coast, causing ships to avoid the island or remain at port. Effective preparation is credited for the relatively low death toll of 312, and not a single ship was lost at sea in the vicinity of Puerto Rico. By comparison, the weaker 1899 San Ciriaco hurricane killed approximately 3,000 people.

According to the San Juan National Weather Service office, the storm was "up to this time the greatest and more [sic] intense and destructive hurricane of record in Puerto Rico." Along the storm path, the eye passed over Guayama, Cayey, and Aibonito, resulting in a period of calm lasting 20 minutes. The island of Puerto Rico received the worst of the storm's winds when the hurricane moved directly across the island at Category 5 strength.

Strongest landfalling Atlantic U.S. hurricanes^{†}
Rank	Name^{‡}	Season	Wind speed	
Rank	Name^{‡}	Season	mph	km/h
1	"Labor Day"	1935	185	295
2	Camille	1969	175	280
3	Andrew	1992	165	270
4	"San Felipe II"*	1928	160	260
4	Michael	2018	160	260
6	Maria	2017	155	250
7	"Last Island"	1856	150	240
7	"Indianola"	1886	150	240
7	"Florida Keys"	1919	150	240
7	"Freeport"	1932	150	240
7	Charley	2004	150	240
7	Laura	2020	150	240
7	Ida	2021	150	240
7	Ian	2022	150	240
Source: NHC, AOML/HRD
^{†}Strength refers to maximum sustained wind speed upon striking land.
^{‡}Systems prior to 1950 were not officially named.
*Name given to the storm at its peak landfall.

The hurricane was extremely large as it crossed Puerto Rico. Hurricane-force winds were measured in Guayama for 18 hours, where a low pressure of 931 mbar (27.5 inHg) was reported. Since the storm is estimated to have been moving at 13 mph (21 km/h), the diameter of the storm's hurricane winds was estimated very roughly to be 234 mi (377 km).

The rainfall recorded on September 13–14, 1928, remains the record for the maximum rainfall associated with a hurricane in Puerto Rico within a period of forty-eight hours. In those regions where precipitation is more common place, as in Adjuntas in the Cordillera Central and in the Sierra de Luquillo, the rain was over 25 inches (640 mm), with 29.60 in (752 mm) recorded in Adjuntas. The anemometer located in Puerta de Tierra lost one of its cups at 11:44 am on September 13, just when it had registered a maximum speed of 150 mph (240 km/h) —a speed that was sustained for five consecutive minutes. Previously the same instrument had measured 160 mph (260 km/h) for one minute. Because these measurements were taken 30 mi (48 km) from San Felipe's eye, at the time, it seemed possible that some estimates of 200 mph (320 km/h) near the center of the storm were not overdrawn.

There was general destruction through the island, with the towns where the eye passed being swept away. Property damage on the island from winds and rain was catastrophic. The northeast portion of the island received winds in excess of Category 3 strength, with hurricane-force winds lasting as long as 18 hours. Official reports stated "several hundred thousand" people were left homeless, and property damages were estimated at $50 million.

Wettest tropical cyclones and their remnants in Puerto Rico Highest-known totals
Precipitation			Storm	Location	Ref.
Rank	mm	in	Storm	Location	Ref.
1	1,058.7	41.68	Fifteen 1970	Jayuya 1 SE	
2	962.7	37.90	Maria 2017	Caguas	
3	845.6	33.29	Eloise 1975	Dos Bocas	
4	822.9	32.40	Fiona 2022	Marueno	
5	804.4	31.67	Isabel 1985	Toro Negro Forest	
6	775.0	30.51	Georges 1998	Jayuya	
7	751.8	29.60	San Felipe II 1928	Adjuntas	
8	662.2	26.07	Hazel 1954	Toro Negro Tunnel	
9	652.5	25.69	Klaus 1984	Guavate Camp	
10	596.4	23.48	Hortense 1996	Cayey 1 NW	

On the island there was no building that was not affected. Some sugar mills ("Centrales") that had cost millions of dollars to build were reduced to rubble. Reports say that 24,728 homes were destroyed and 192,444 were partially destroyed. Most of the sugarcane fields were flooded, ruining the year's crops. Half of the coffee plants and half of the shade trees that covered these were destroyed; almost all of the coffee harvest was lost. The coffee industry would take years to recover since coffee needs shade trees to grow. The tobacco farms also had great losses. After this hurricane, Puerto Rico never regained its position as a major coffee exporter.

Communications were disrupted by fallen trees, landslides, and damaged bridges. Some 770 school buildings were destroyed or damaged. According to some estimates of the day, excluding personal losses, the damages reached $85.312 million and more than 500,000 people were left homeless. Until Hurricane Maria 89 years later, San Felipe II was officially classified as Puerto Rico's biggest, worst, and most devastating hurricane to ever have hit the island.

=== Greater Antilles and Bahamas ===
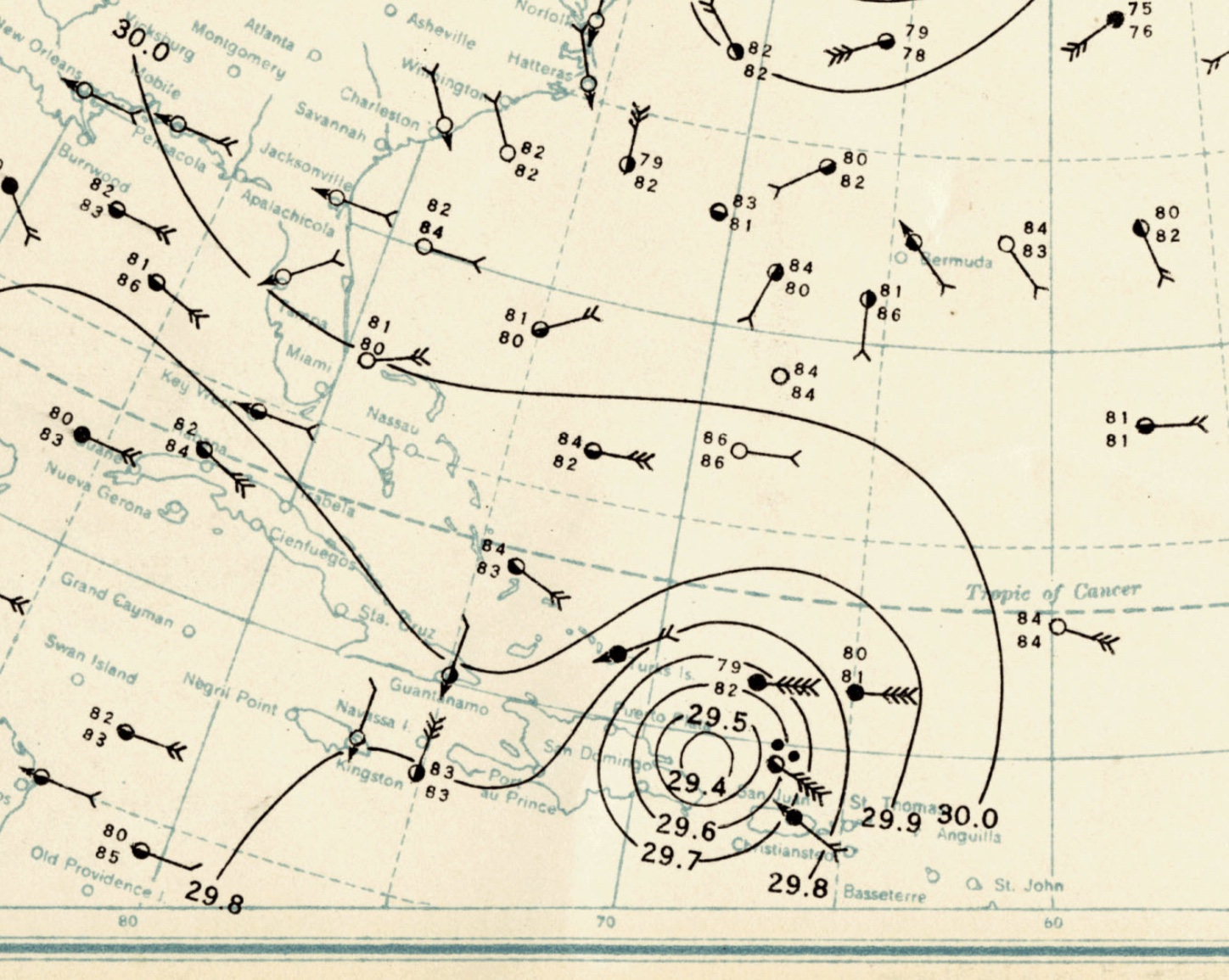
Map of the hurricane passing to the north of the Dominican Republic on September 14

After affecting Puerto Rico, the hurricane passed just north of the Dominican Republic, causing little impact, due to the small core of the storm and weaker winds to the south of the center. Additionally, advance warning reduced the number of ships traversing the region. Nonetheless, the cyclone deroofed some homes and damaged a few ships around Puerto Plata. Heavy rains fell around Cap-Haïtien, Haiti. In Cuba, abnormally high tides generated by the storm sent interrupted shipping and pushed water above the Malecón seawall.

While the hurricane was passing nearby, Grand Turk reported winds of 120 mph (193 km/h). According to a ship report in the region, "The force of the wind ... could only be judged by the noise made by the storm, which reminded me of the New York subway going full speed passing switches." Two boats were wrecked as they washed ashore in Grand Turk, although the crews were saved. A sloop traversing from Ambergris Cay to Grand Turk was lost, killing all 18 people on board. The islands also lost approximately 225,000 bushels of salt. Although the 1928 hurricane produced winds stronger than any during the 1926 season, less structural damage occurred, which Hurricane Relief Officer W. E. Tatem attributed to improvements in the construction of buildings.

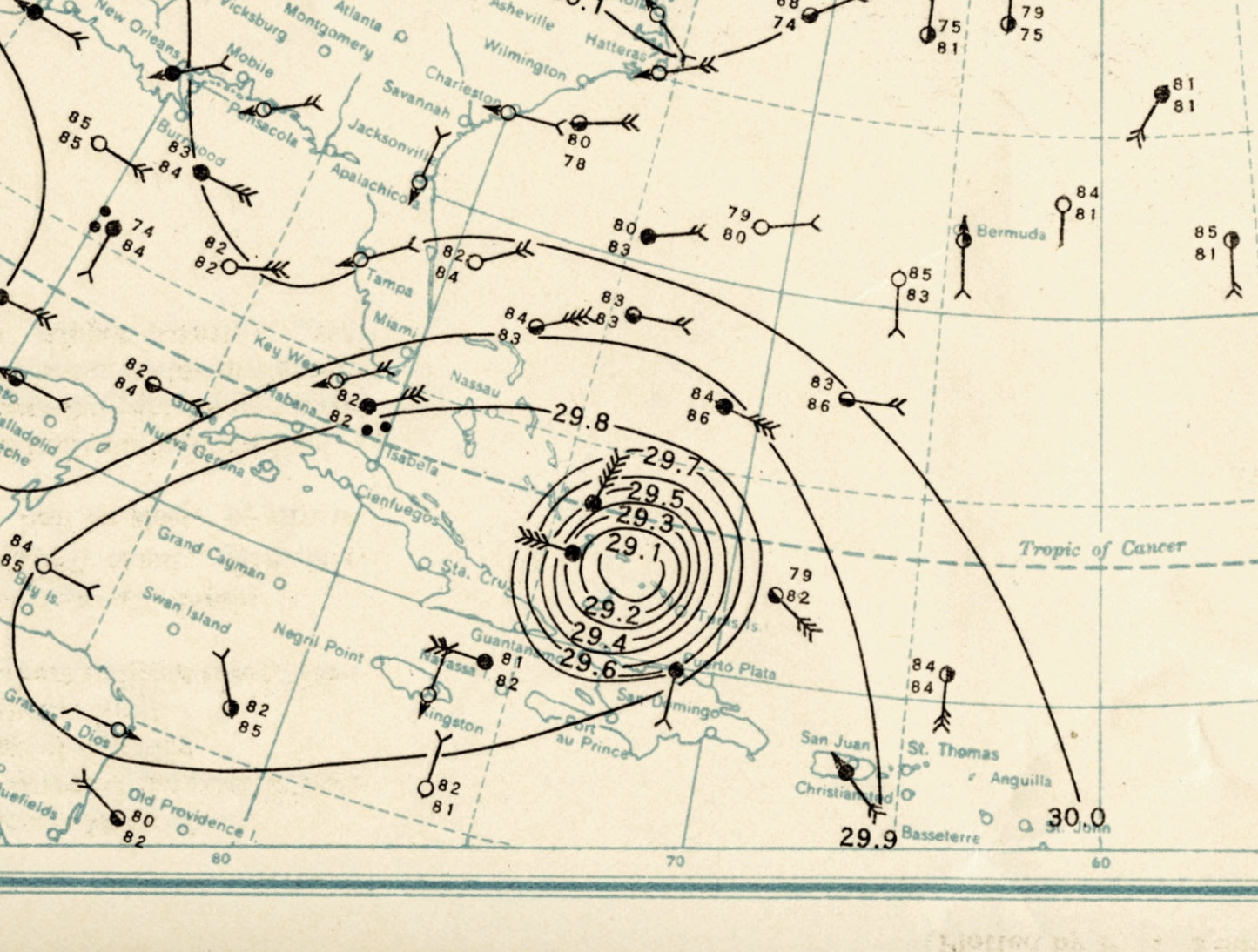
Map of the hurricane approaching the Bahamas on September 15

As in Puerto Rico, authorities in the Bahamas had ample warning of the hurricane's approach, and preparations minimized the loss of life in the islands. The storm caused heavy damage throughout the Bahamas, mostly to property and crops. Although Inagua did not experience major impact, high winds cut off communications with Nassau. Acklins reported the destruction of most crops and about 40 boats. Nearby, the hurricane destroyed six homes on Long Cay. Approximately 200 people became stranded at Atwood's Cay (also known as Samana Cay) after losing their boats. A near-complete loss of food crops also occurred on San Salvador Island, where the cyclone demolished four buildings, including two churches, and inflicted minor damage on other structures. Exuma, Long Island and Rum Cay reported no major damage, although the latter had heavy crop losses.

Winds approached 120 mph (193 km/h) at Nassau before the anemometer failed, downing many telegraph and telephone lines across the city. In addition to the winds, the storm dropped heavy rainfall across the Bahamas, totaling 9 in (230 mm) in Nassau. Some buildings which had been recently repaired after the 1926 Nassau hurricane were destroyed during this storm. At the Fort Montague Hotel, the windows, doors, and furniture were badly damaged. Similar damage was reported at the Royal Victoria Hotel, while the British Colonial Hotel was largely spared. However, the gardens of the three hotels were "damaged almost beyond recognition". At least four churches also suffered substantial impacts. Three deaths occurred in Nassau, one when a girl who drowned after falling into an open trench filled with water.

Deadliest Atlantic hurricanes
Rank	Hurricane	Season	Fatalities
1	? "Great Hurricane"	1780	22,000–27,501
2	5 Mitch	1998	11,374+
3	2 Fifi	1974	8,210–10,000
4	4 "Galveston"	1900	8,000–12,000
5	4 Flora	1963	7,193
6	? "Pointe-à-Pitre"	1776	6,000+
7	5 "Okeechobee"	1928	4,112+
8	? "Newfoundland"	1775	4,000–4,163
9	3 "Monterrey"	1909	4,000
10	4 "San Ciriaco"	1899	3,855

The hurricane obliterated many bridges, roads, and buildings, and approximately 100 homes on Cat Island, including about 60 in Bight alone. Ninety-five houses and some other buildings, including a few churches and government buildings, were damaged or destroyed on Eleuthera. A reporter for The Nassau Guardian stated that "The years 1866 and 1926 will now be forgotten, and 1928 will hold first place as the year of the worst storm that has ever visited this part of the island of Eleuthera." Sustained winds of 140 mph (230 km/h) were observed on Bimini, causing major damage to buildings, including "rum row", a strategic port for smuggling alcohol into the United States during Prohibition. The storm beached or several vessels on Grand Bahama and carried away a number of docks. Many roads on the island were washed out and rendered impassable, while most residences experienced at least severe damage.

=== Florida ===
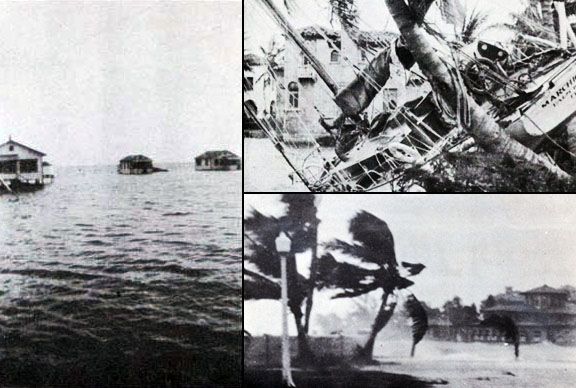
Pictures of the flooding and damage caused by the hurricane in Florida

While the hurricane was moving through the Bahamas, the Weather Bureau issued storm warnings from Miami to Titusville, later upgrading to a hurricane warning from Miami to Daytona Beach. The agency advised residents to take precautions for the hurricane, citing the potential for strong winds and waves. Hurricane warnings were also posted for the west coast from Punta Rassa to Apalachicola, and after the storm recurved, hurricane warnings were extended along the east coast to Jacksonville. Because of well-issued hurricane warnings, residents were prepared for the storm, and only 26 deaths were recorded in the coastal Palm Beach area.

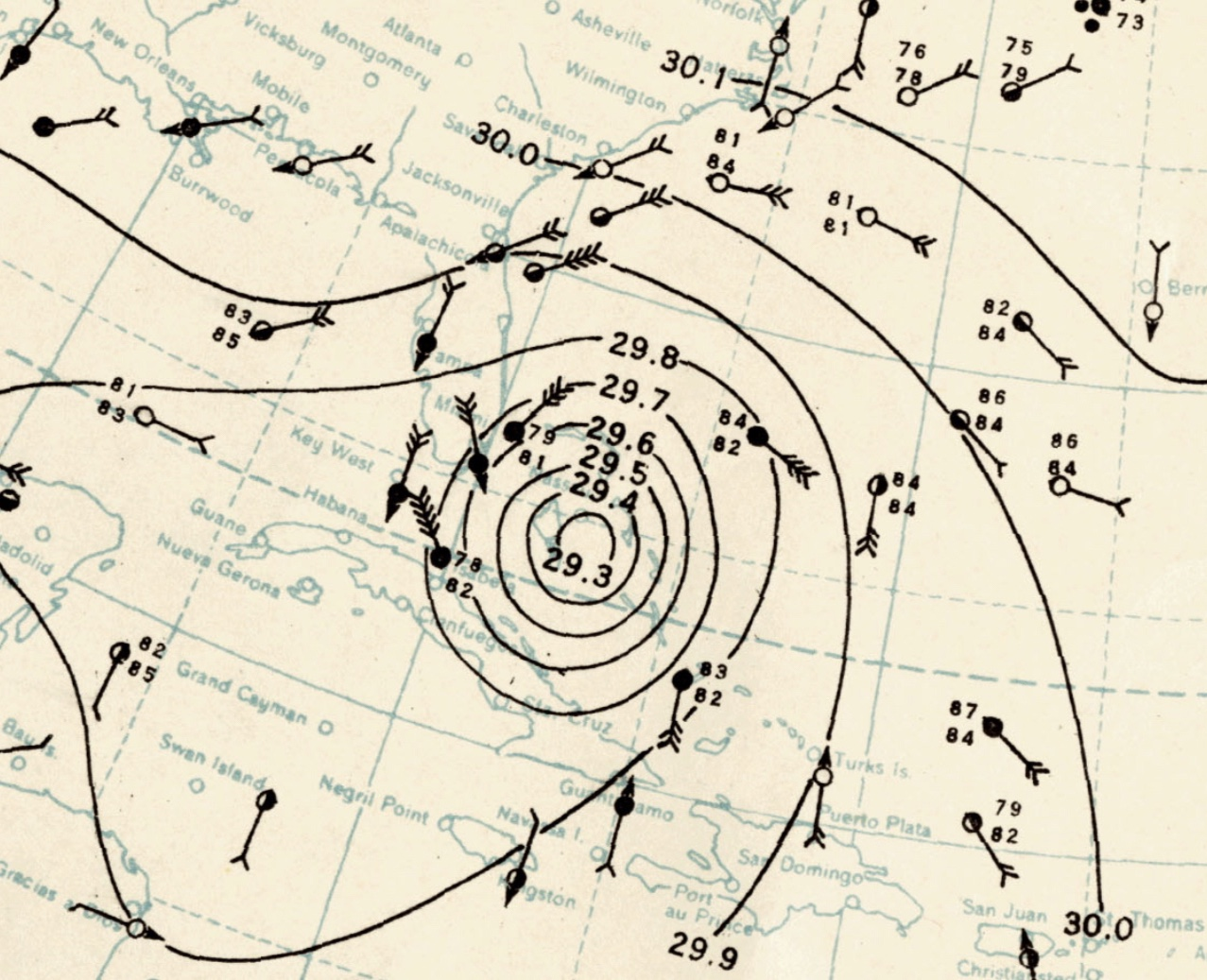
Weather map of the hurricane approaching the Florida east coast on September 16, just several hours prior to landfall near Palm Beach

Strong winds struck southern Florida as the hurricane moved ashore, with three unofficial reports of 100 mph (161 km/h). In Miami to the south of the center, winds reached 78 mph (126 km/h), and farther south, Key West reported winds of 39 mph (63 km/h). The eye at landfall was 25 mi (40 km) wide, and after moving inland crossed Lake Okeechobee, where a calm was reported for 30 minutes. Winds at Canal Point, adjacent to the lake, were estimated as high as 160 mph (257 km/h); the anemometer blew away after reporting sustained winds of 75 mph (121 km/h). The pressure at Canal Point dropped to 942 mbar (27.8 inHg). The lowest pressure north of Lake Okeechobee was 966 mbar (28.5 inHg) in Bartow, and along the west coast, winds reached 31 mph (50 km/h) in Tampa.

The hurricane left thousands of people homeless in Florida; property damage was estimated at $25 million ($469 million). It is estimated if a similar storm were to strike as of the year 2003, it would cause $18.7 billion in damages. The cyclone remains one of three Atlantic hurricanes to strike the southern mainland of Florida with a central pressure below 940 mbar (28 inHg), the others being the 1926 Miami hurricane and Hurricane Andrew of 1992.

In addition to the human fatalities, 1,278 livestock and 47,389 poultry were killed. Agriculture was significantly affected, with the storm destroying what may have been the largest "citrus crop in the history of the industry". Approximately 6% of oranges and 18% of grapefruit were ruined. Harvesting the remaining crops was delayed until mid-October due to inundated groves. Communications also suffered severely. Throughout the state, 32,000 households were left without telephone service and 400 poles were broken and about 2,500 others leaning. Governor of Florida John W. Martin estimated that 15,000 families were left homeless in Palm Beach County alone. Additionally, about 11,500 families would need to be "re-established".

==== Coastal South Florida ====
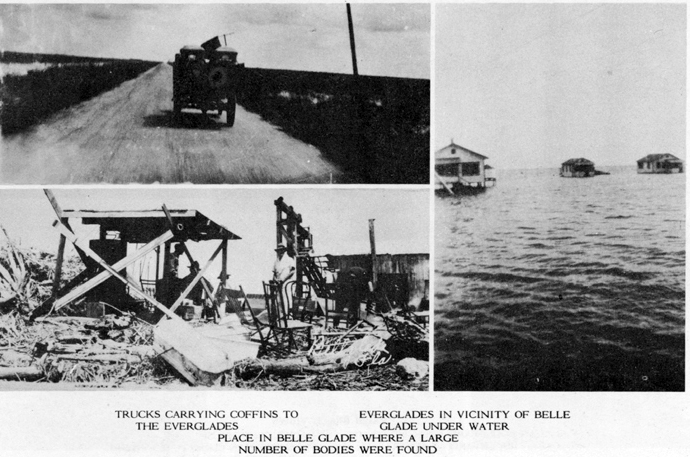
Aftermath of the hurricane in southern Florida

In Miami, damage was minimal, limited to broken windows and awnings. In Hollywood and Fort Lauderdale, windows and roofs were damaged, although to a fairly minor extent. Numerous power lines and telephone wires were downed in the latter city. Northward, from Pompano Beach to Jupiter, buildings suffered serious damage from the heavy winds and 10 ft (3.0 m) storm surge. Nearly all small frame houses were destroyed in Deerfield Beach, while several citizens estimated that at least 50% of homes were demolished. The town's post office, depot, and an entire business block were also destroyed. An eight-year-old boy drowned in a ditch near where his family sought refuge. In Boca Raton, two garages and several houses were destroyed. At the Cloister Inn, windows were shattered and the roof was damaged; across the street, 32 freight cars belonging to a train along the Florida East Coast Railway were tossed by the wind into a nearby ditch. A short distance to the north, a warehouse was flattened. A building occupied by a restaurant and a store was flattened. In Delray Beach, four churches suffered severe damage and the Alta Repp and Seacrest hotels both lost a portion of their roof. The police reported three deaths within the city. In Delray Beach and Lantana, all houses and the railroad station were badly damaged. In Boynton Beach, about 75% of businesses suffered complete destruction. Fifteen people were injured by a roof collapse while taking refuge in the auditorium of a high school.

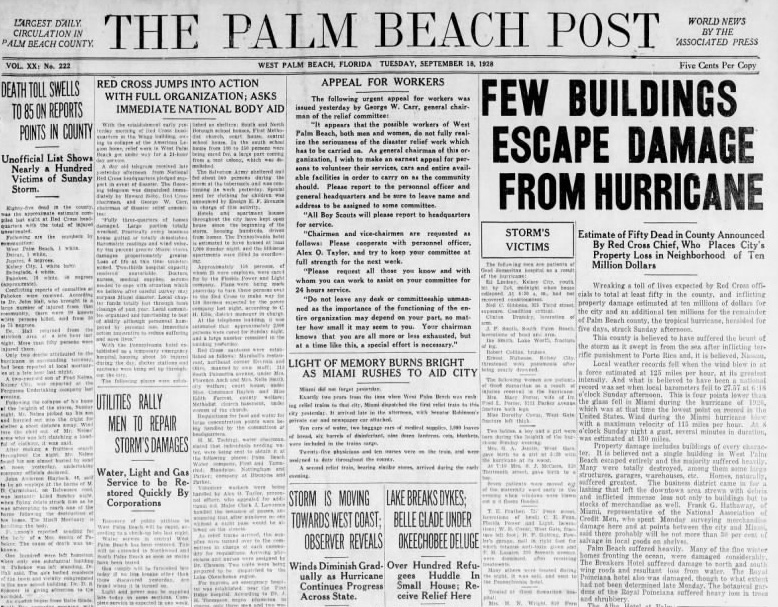
Front page of The Palm Beach Post on September 18, regarding the hurricane's impact in Florida

In Lake Worth, approximately 50% of homes were damaged or destroyed, while 75% of buildings in the business district suffered damage. Damage along the coast was most severe in Palm Beach. Total coastal damages were estimated as "several million" dollars. In West Palm Beach, the storm destroyed 1,711 homes and damaged 6,369 others, and demolished 268 businesses and impacted 490 other businesses; the city suffered the worst damage, totaling just under $13.8 million. Likewise, there was also severe wind damage in Palm Beach. A few buildings constructed by Henry Flagler, such as The Breakers, the Royal Poinciana Hotel, and Whitehall, were damaged. Mar-a-Lago suffered few effects other than uprooted trees and the destruction of a large Roman-style window, according to Marjorie Merriweather Post. Rodman Wanamaker's house, known as "La Querida" and later the "Winter White House" when used by President John F. Kennedy, suffered heavy damage during the storm. The Alba, Billows, New Palm Beach, and Royal Daneli hotels all suffered water damage, while the Alba Hotel was also deroofed. Nearby, the Rainbow Pier had only structural damage to its railings, though the pier office was blown away. Approximately 600 structures, including 10 hotels, were damaged in Palm Beach. Damage totaled over $2 million.

The strongest winds in the eyewall affected northern Palm Beach County, particularly the vicinity of Jupiter as the eye made landfall farther south. At the Jupiter Inlet Lighthouse, the mortar was reportedly "squeezed ... like toothpaste" from between the bricks during the storm, swaying the tower 17 in (430 mm) off the base. The lighthouse keeper, Captain Seabrook, and his son, Franklin, worked to keep the light on during the storm after the electricity went out. After the generator failed to work, they hand-cranked the light's mantle. The building formerly used as a Weather Bureau Office was destroyed. Nearby, several people died after a house was demolished. Six other fatalities occurred west of Jupiter after a school where people sought shelter collapsed.

==== Lake Okeechobee and Everglades ====
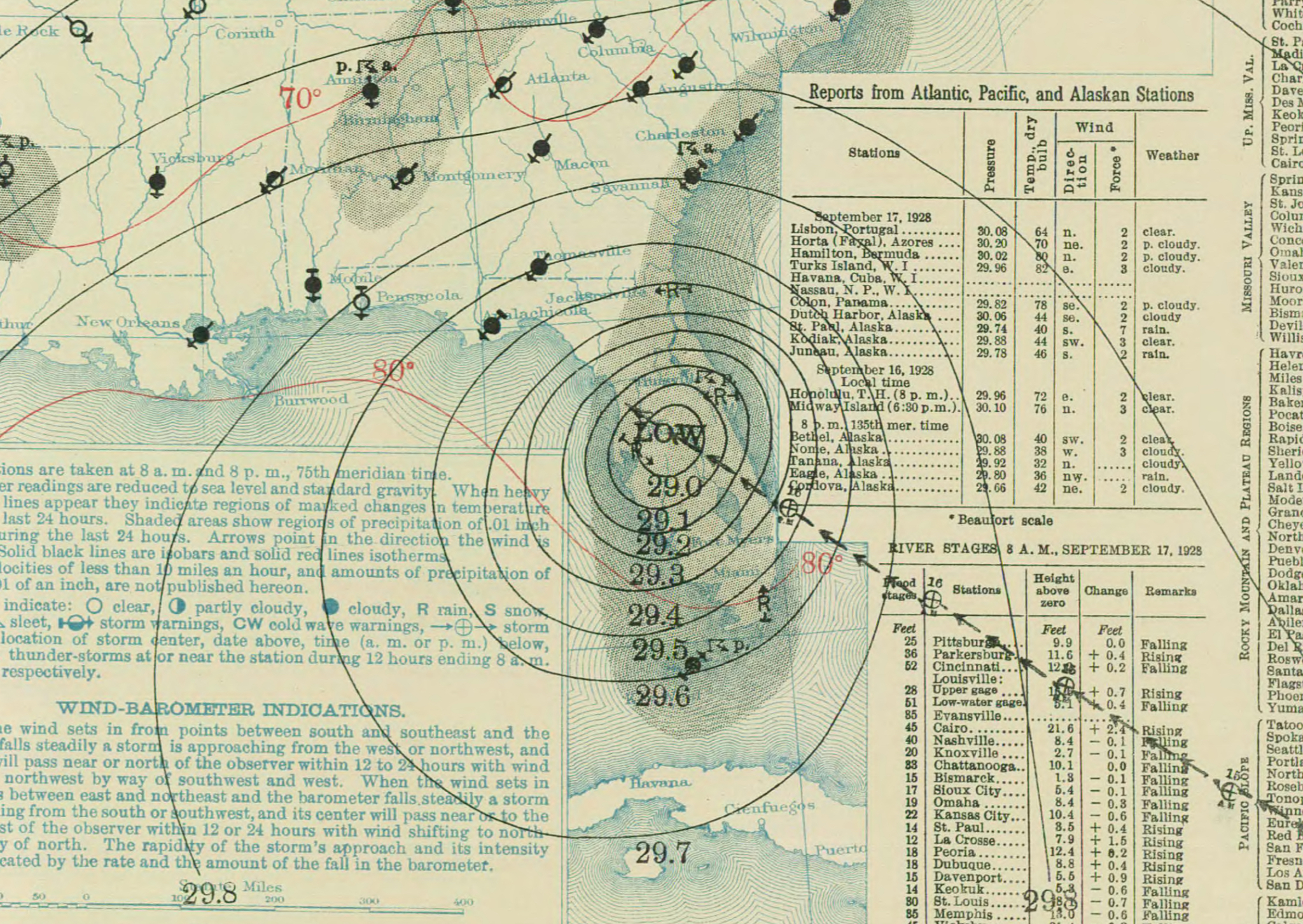
Map of the hurricane over Florida on September 17

Inland, the hurricane wreaked much more widespread destruction along the more heavily populated coast of Lake Okeechobee. Residents had been warned to evacuate the low ground earlier in the day, but after the hurricane did not arrive on schedule, many thought it had missed and returned to their homes. In the weeks prior to the storm, heavy rainfall had caused the lake to rise 3 ft (0.91 m) between August 10 and September 10 and filled nearby canals and ditches. Precipitation from the hurricane itself caused Lake Okeechobee to rise further.

When the worst of the storm crossed the lake, the south-blowing wind caused a storm surge to overflow the small dike that had been built at the south end of the lake. The resulting flood covered an area of hundreds of square miles with water that in some places was more than 20 ft (6.1 m) deep. Houses were floated off their foundations and dashed to pieces against any obstacles encountered. Most survivors and bodies were washed out into the Everglades, where many of the bodies were never found. Agricultural losses in the area surrounding Lake Okeechobee were also significant, with virtually all crops destroyed and over 150 tractors suffering damage.

Map showing extent of storm surge flooding around Lake Okeechobee

As the rear eyewall passed over the area, the flood reversed itself, breaking the dikes along the northern coast of the lake and causing similar but smaller flooding. Route 98, then known as Conner's Highway, was closed until January, when the bridge across the Onosohatchee River at Taylor Creek was replaced after the original bridge was carried about 150 ft (46 m) upstream during the storm. In Okeechobee County, homes along the lake were destroyed by the storm surge, while dwellings within the city of Okeechobee were severely damaged or demolished by winds of at least 90 mph (140 km/h). However, brick and concrete dwellings suffered little damage. A number of three-story business buildings collapsed during the storm. Almost all roads were left impassable, while communications were nearly wiped out. Overall, 27 deaths occurred in Okeechobee County. Along the southwestern shore of Lake Okeechobee, the towns of Clewiston and Moore Haven were both flooded, but most houses suffered more damage due to strong winds.

On Kreamer Island, many residents received information about the storm when it was too late to evacuate. In some houses, 20–30 people sought shelter inside and later stood on tables and chairs to remain above the water. Most of the houses were swept away into rows of pine trees and others more than one-half mile (0.80 km) away. Despite this, only one person drowned on the island. Residents of Torry Island did not have enough time to prepare for the storm. They tried to evacuate, but with the causeway already inundated, twenty-three people sought refuge in a packinghouse. Floodwaters entered the building, forcing the occupants into the rafters. The building was eventually pushed into a nearby canal. Ten people drowned, but thirteen others survived by clinging to a barge or tree tops, while one woman tied herself to a telegraph pole. Others who survived were swept far away from the original sites of the building and the barge. A teenage boy was carried from the packinghouse to the Everglades Experiment Station in Belle Glade – a distance of about 8 mi (13 km). On Ritta Island, a number of persons who had successfully climbed to the roof of their houses to escape floodwaters were struck by trees or received fatal bites from water moccasins.

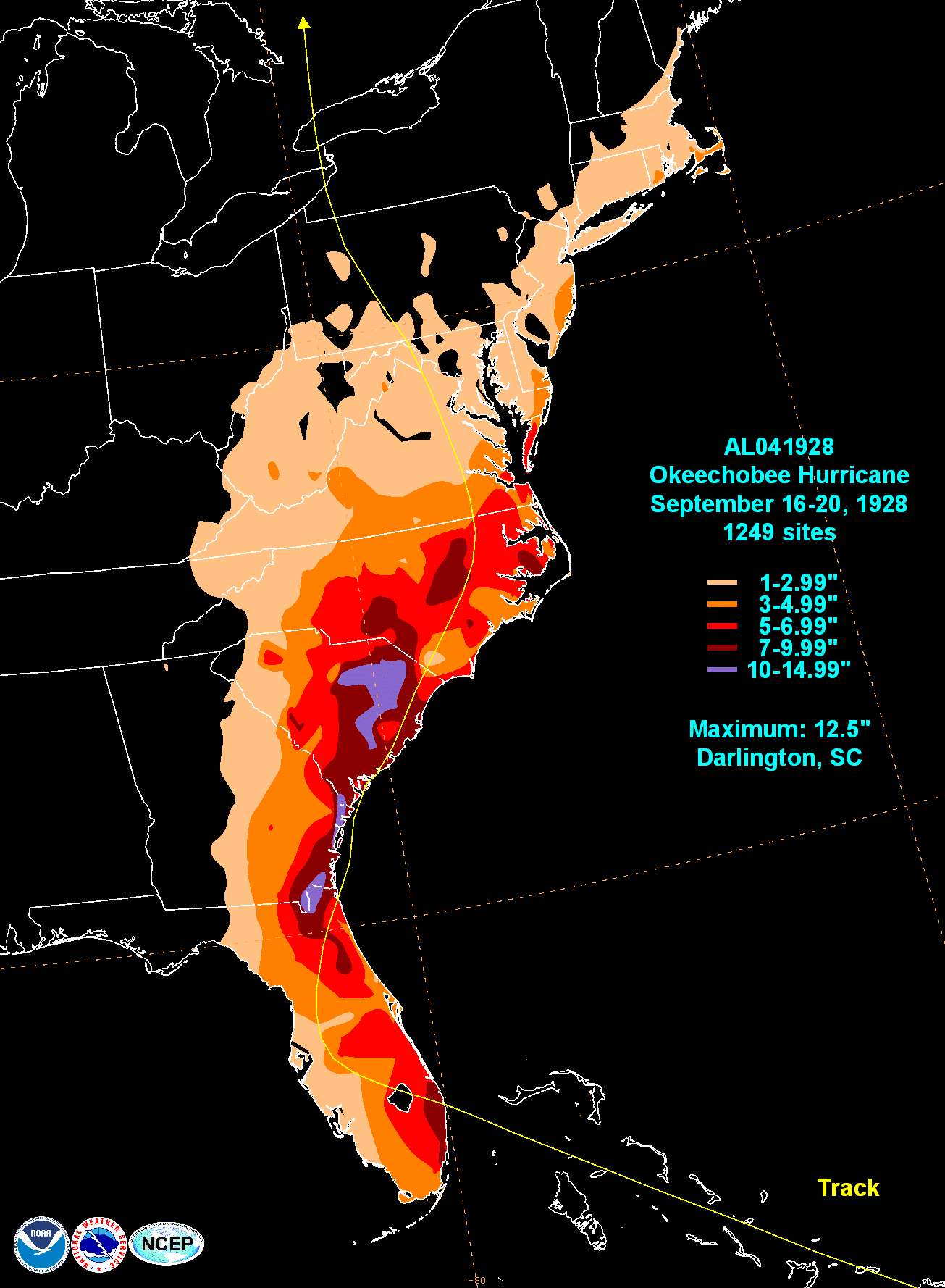
Rainfall totals from the hurricane

In South Bay, nearly all houses were destroyed and several buildings were unroofed. At least 160 fatalities occurred in the city. The future first mayor of South Bay, Aubrey (a.k.a. "Orb" or "A.O.") Walker, along with his brother, Haughty D. Walker (a.k.a. "Haught"), survived the great hurricane of 1928 by gathering family members and joining a number of other South Bay citizens on a barge in the canal; this action allowed them to survive the flood waters that swept over South Bay and ultimately engulfed Okeelanta. Throughout the 1920s, Okeelanta had suffered several floods and muck fires. After being flooded severely during the 1928 hurricane, it was abandoned. Bean City was also destroyed during the hurricane, but it was eventually rebuilt by Arthur Wells. Sebring Farms was reduced to piles of rubber, with only four tall royal palm trees left standing. The hotel at Miami Locks was the only building to survive the storm. Ninety-nine people died in that town. In Chosen, only two people escaped a house that had sheltered nineteen people. Twenty other residents took refuge in a building which lost its roof during the storm, forcing the occupants to move into the restroom. A house that was full of people floated about one-half mile (0.80 km) from its original location. The refugees were unaware that the house was moving until it collided with a railroad embankment.

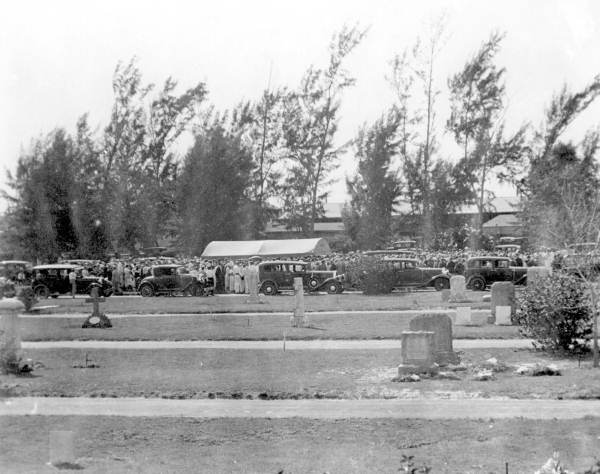
Burial of victims in West Palm Beach

Floodwaters persisted for several weeks, greatly impeding attempts to clean up the devastation. Burial services were quickly overwhelmed, and many of the bodies were placed into mass graves. Around 75% of the fatalities were migrant farm workers, making identification of both the dead and missing very difficult; as a result of this, the count of the dead is not very accurate. The Red Cross estimated the number of fatalities as 1,836, which was taken as the official count by the National Weather Service for many years. Older sources usually list 3,411 as the hurricane's total count of fatalities, including the Caribbean. However, in 2003, the U.S. death count was revised to "at least" 2,500, making the Okeechobee hurricane one of the deadliest natural disasters in United States history. A mass grave at the Port Mayaca Cemetery east of Port Mayaca contains the bodies of 1,600 victims of the hurricane.

==== Central and North Florida ====
In Fort Myers, property damage was slight, limited mostly to scores of small boats and fishing shacks along the waterfront. Nearly all cigar factories in Tampa were closed after wind and rain drove too much moisture into the buildings. Offshore, the fishing smack Wallace A. McDonnell was beached near Piney Point, though all of the crew survived. The Cuban schooner Isabel Alvado sank offshore Boca Grande. The crew, who were immigrants, were rescued by the Coast Guard and later deported. In Martin County, a bridge connecting Stuart and Palm City was severely damaged and closed to traffic as a result. A temporary ferry service across the St. Lucie River was established and operated until repairs to the bridge were complete in the summer of 1929. In Fort Pierce, most of the effects were confined to the waterfront areas. A warehouse, fish houses, docks, and a bridge across the Indian River were destroyed, while several other buildings were unroofed. Damage in the city totaled about $150,000.

In the interior areas of Central and North Florida, effects were mainly confined to agricultural losses, particularly citrus, though wind damage occurred to structures. Between Sebring and Lake Wales, 200 telephone poles were toppled. In Bartow, business building windows were shattered and signs were knocked down, while several roofs and chimneys also suffered damage. Winds gusting up to 70 mph (110 km/h) lashed Lakeland. Many trees were uprooted and several buildings were impacted, including the hospital and a number of businesses. At Florida Southern College (FSC), the north side of the gymnasium collapsed while other buildings on campus were damaged to a lesser degree. The trees in the citrus grove surrounding FSC lost much of their fruit. Overall, Lakeland suffered about $50,000 in damage. In Orlando, damage to properties was described as slight. Strong winds up to 50 mph (80 km/h) affected the Jacksonville area, resulting in minor damage at Jacksonville Beach.

=== Elsewhere ===
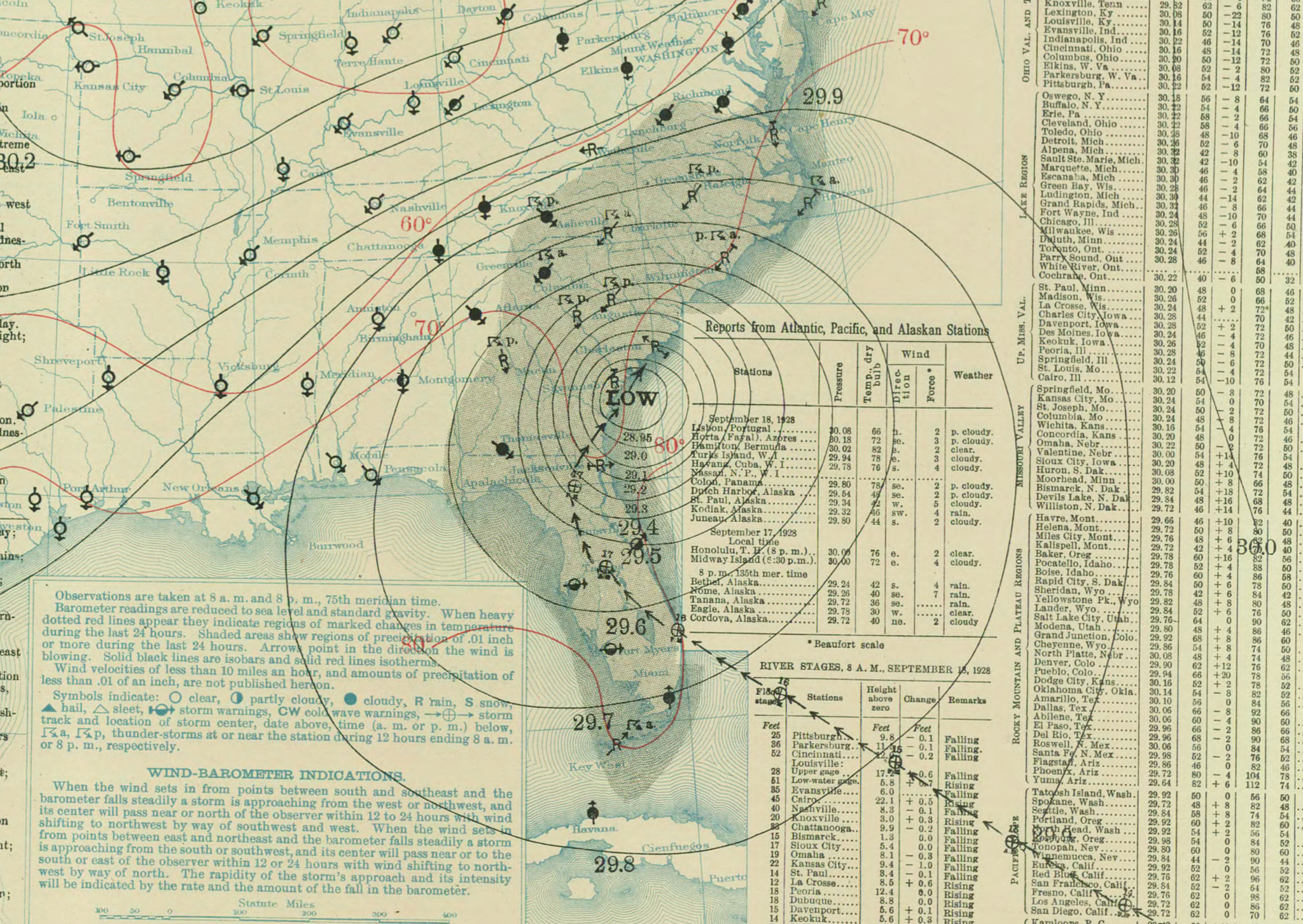
Map of the hurricane re-emerging over water and approaching landfall in South Carolina on September 18

Outside Florida, damage from the hurricane elsewhere in the United States was minor. Heavy rainfall occurred from eastern Florida through coastal Georgia, the Carolinas, and southeast Virginia. The highest rainfall total was 12.53 inches (318 mm) at Darlington, South Carolina. In Georgia, low-lying streets were flooded or washed out in the Savannah area, where sustained winds peaked at 52 mph (84 km/h). Throughout the southeastern portions of the state, the hurricane destroyed a few cottages and frail structures, toppled many trees, and disrupted communications via telephone and telegraph. An Atlantic Refining Company facility near Brunswick suffered approximately $20,000 in losses, but this was mainly due to gas escaping the building.

In South Carolina, the storm contributed to the heavy rains that fell throughout the month of September. The Black River at Kingstree crested at a record height of 18 ft (5.5 m). Winds also caused about $1.5 million in damage, especially to crops and trees. Likewise, North Carolina reported heavy rains and gale-force winds across the eastern half of the state. Some locations along the Cape Fear River reported record-high crests, including 64.7 ft (19.7 m) at Fayetteville and 41.3 ft (12.6 m) at Elizabethtown. Flooding washed out highways and caused many others to be closed, while reports describe the flooding at Lumberton as "the worst in history."

Storm surge in Virginia reached 7.2 feet (2.2 m) above mean lower low water in Norfolk, while Cape Henry recorded sustained winds of 72 mph (116 km/h). The Virginia section of Climatological Data noted that the storm "did considerable damage to some crops." In Maryland, storm surge and abnormally high tides caused flooding along the waterfronts of Annapolis and Baltimore – including damaging nearby properties and merchandise – and capsized several small vessels. Three people died in Baltimore. Winds caused damage in portions of that state, with 10 homes losing their tin roofs in Hagerstown. Ocean City reported about $60,000 in damage, with the cyclone destroying the airport and an airplane, unroofing three cottages, and shattering many windows. Maryland suffered significant losses to corn and tomato crops, while fruit was blown from trees. A coal barge sank at Lewes, Delaware. Damage in Delaware, Virginia, and Washington, D.C. combined exceeded $1 million.

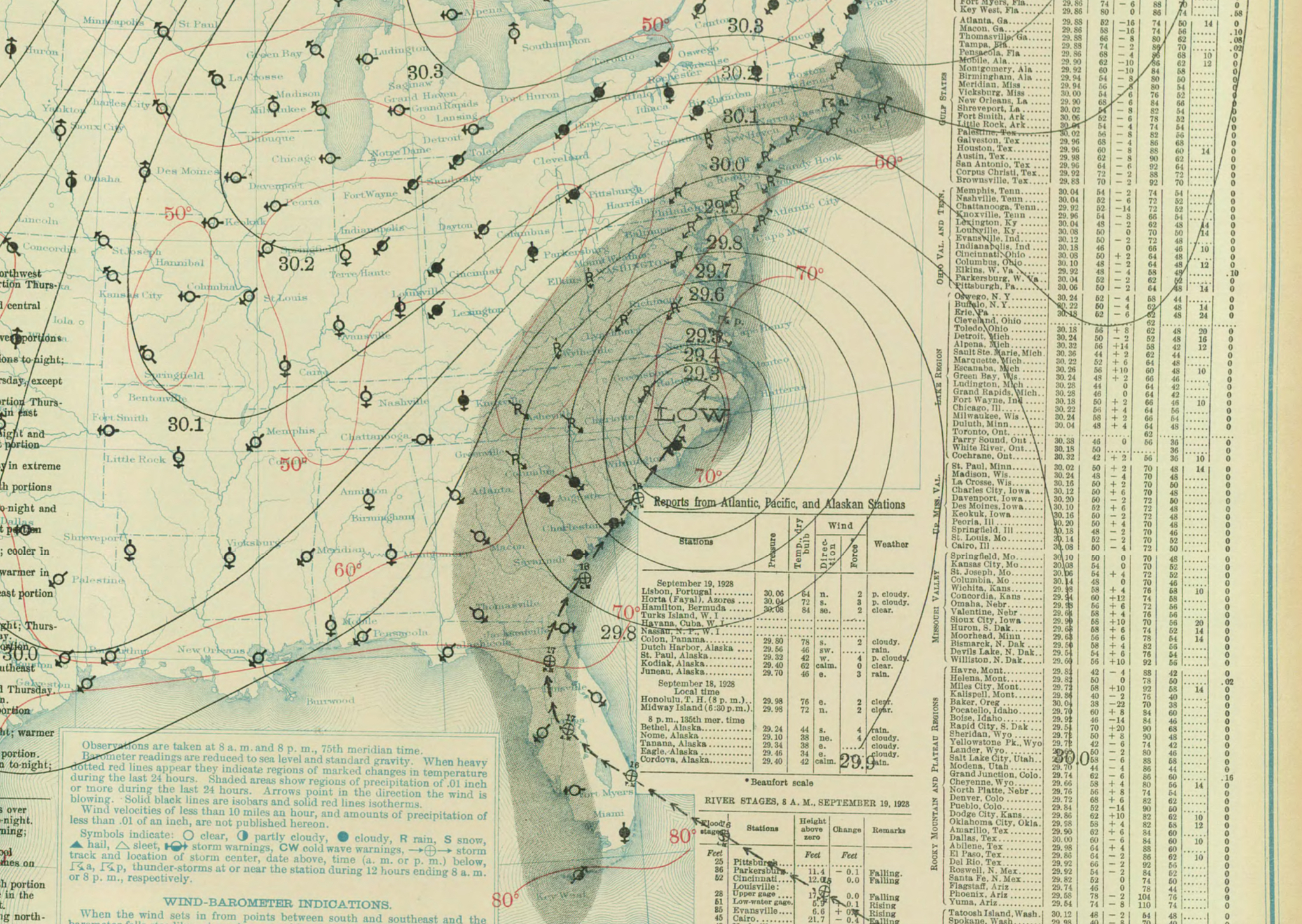
Map of the hurricane's extratropical remnants over North Carolina on September 19

After the hurricane became extratropical, its wind field became very large. Atlantic City, New Jersey, recorded winds of 76 mph (122 km/h) despite being far from the center. The storm caused power outages and flooding many South Jersey towns. Damage reached into the hundreds of thousands of dollars, while three people died in the state, all due to drowning. One resort, the Inlet Hotel, alone experienced about $15,000 to $20,000 in damage after waves overtopped the building and flooded the entire first floor. The West Jersey and Seashore Railroad bridges linking Ocean City, Stone Harbor, and Wildwood to the mainland were washed out. Additionally, the cyclone destroyed about 400 ft (120 m) of railroad tracks in Point Pleasant. Near Perth Amboy, a tree fell on car occupied by multiple individuals, including Hamilton F. Kean, a candidate for the 1928 United States Senate election in New Jersey. After being rescued, Kean went to a campaign event in Union City as planned. The Garden State Fair in Bridgeton closed after the storm damaged small buildings, whisked away tents, and tossed exhibition animals for distances as long as hundreds of feet. Extensive losses to corn, dahlia, and peaches occurred in the vicinity of Mullica Hill.

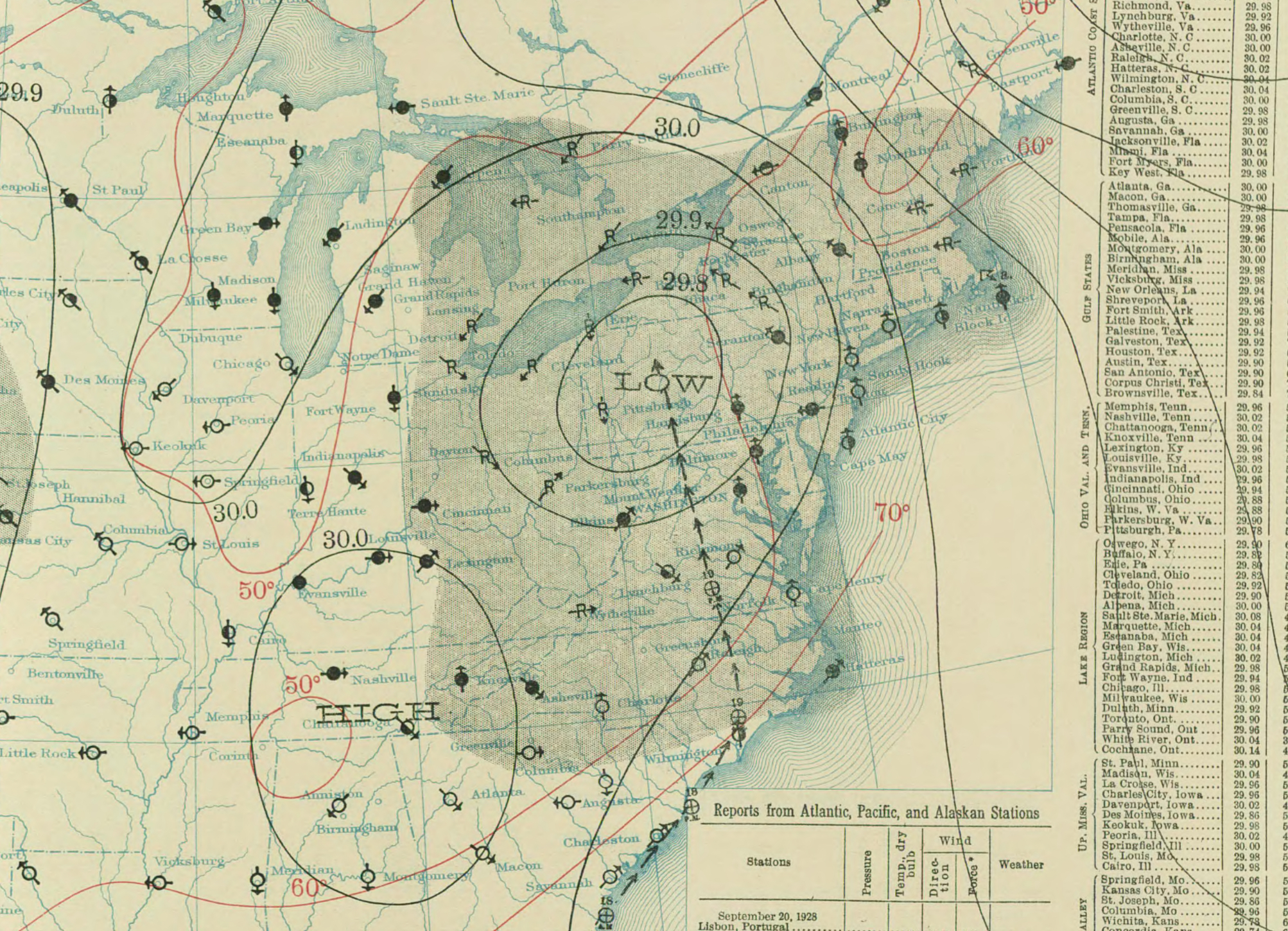
Map of the extratropical remains of the storm over Pennsylvania in the Mid-Atlantic on September 20

Seven deaths occurred in Pennsylvania, all in the Philadelphia area. Winds in the city uprooted many trees and shattered windows, as rains stalled traffic and caused many car accidents. Significant losses to orchards were reported near Lansdale. In New York, heavy downpours in New York City caused traffic congestion and knocked four telephone exchanges offline, while winds downed many trees. Weather conditions also led to the postponement of a late season baseball game between the Chicago Cubs and the New York Giants. One man died in Brooklyn after being blown off a gas tank scaffold and subsequently falling about 300 ft (91 m). Several small boats capsized in Westchester County.

In Massachusetts, the storm produced sustained winds up to 50 mph (80 km/h) along the coast, but The Boston Globe noted that no damage to shipping occurred, although several yachts at the Orient Heights Yachts Club were driven away from their moorings. High seas at Plymouth beached several vessels, with some suffering considerable damage. Power outages and disruptions to telephone service occurred in Cambridge after winds downed several wires.

== Aftermath ==
Deadliest United States hurricanes
Rank	Hurricane	Season	Fatalities
1	4 "Galveston"	1900	8,000–12,000
2	4 "San Ciriaco"	1899	3,400
3	5 Maria	2017	2,982
4	5 "Okeechobee"	1928	2,823
5	4 "Cheniere Caminada"	1893	2,000
6	5 Katrina	2005	1,392
7	3 "Sea Islands"	1893	1,000–2,000
8	3 "Indianola"	1875	771
9	4 "Florida Keys"	1919	745
10	2 "Georgia"	1881	700
Reference: NOAA, GWU (Note: The storm category color indicates the intensity of the hurricane when landfalling in the U.S.)

In the United States Virgin Islands (USVI), the American Red Cross conducted most of their recovery operations on Saint Croix due to the storm passing near that island. Overall, the organization provided food to 852 families, clothing to 320 families, and building materials to or assistance in reconstructing the residences of 262 families. Among the building material sent by the Red Cross were "125 square feet [11.6129 square metres] of galvanized corrugated iron sheets, 100,000 broad feet [30,480 metres] of roof sheeting, and 140,000 broad feet [42,672 metres] of assorted lumber", as noted by Eliot Kleinberg. In monetary terms, the Red Cross spent just over $34,500 in aid to the USVI.

Relief expenditures for the USVI and Puerto Rico combined exceeded $3.2 million, with the vast majority of that total being received by the latter. This included almost $1.4 million for building materials, just under $694,000 for agricultural programs, nearly $526,000 for food, about $185,000 for grants to local Red Cross chapters, close to $164,000 for clothing, around $148,700 for administrative expenses, and approximately $70,500 for medical services, among other recovery costs. Within Puerto Rico alone, the organization distributed food to 128,513 families, clothing to 65,901 families, and building material to 37,344 families, along with an initial shipment of 2 million pounds of beans, flour, pork, and salt; roughly 36,000 blankets, 5,000 cots, and almost 1,000 tents. The Insular Health Department and the Red Cross also provided hundreds of thousands to millions of antitoxins and vaccines for protection against diphtheria, tetanus, and typhoid. For the USVI, Puerto Rico, and the mainland United States combined, the Red Cross received more than $5.9 million in contributions.

A British Royal Navy ship called Durban arrived at Grand Turk in the Turks and Caicos Islands on September 26 to offer aid, which was mostly declined except for a shipment of potatoes. The Durban, ridden by future King George VI, continued on to Nassau in the Bahamas. The Bahamian Board of Agriculture distributed corn seeds and requested tomato seeds.

=== Florida ===
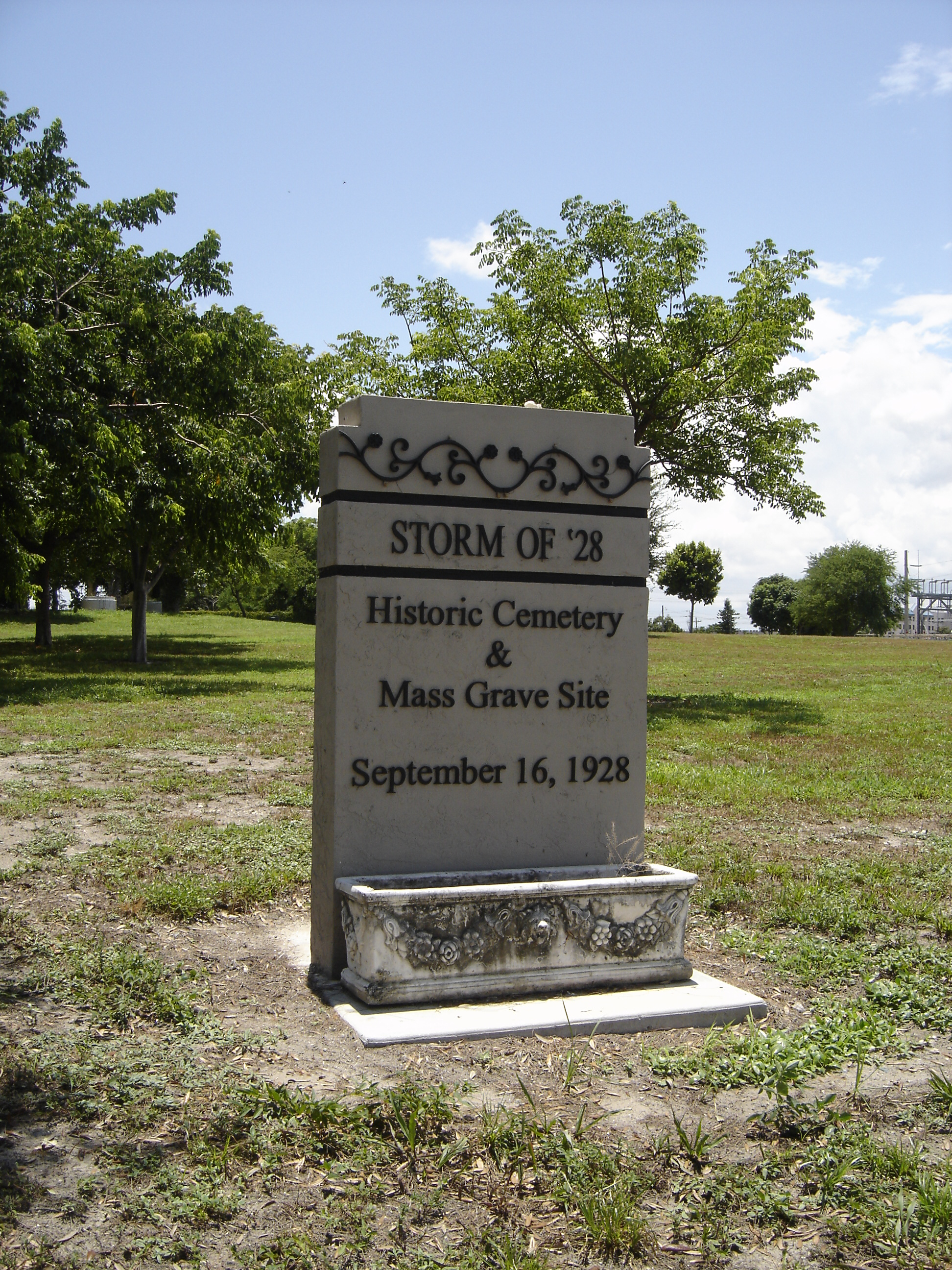
Historical marker at the mass grave in West Palm Beach

In the immediate aftermath of the deadly storm, relief arrived from nearby areas such as Miami. A group of men with trucks were dispatched northward from Miami to clear trees and other debris from the roads. They worked quickly enough to reach West Palm Beach by the night of September 17. Early the next day, a train leaving Miami carried 20 doctors and 20 nurses to West Palm Beach. The Miami Red Cross Citizens Relief Committee, which was established to provide aid for victims of the storm, transported "hundreds of loaves of bread, gallons of milk, pounds of coffee and sugar, blankets, cots, and medical supplies." The first relief train was ridden by U.S. Senator Joseph T. Robinson, the Democratic vice presidential nominee during the election that year. At least 100 people were brought to Miami for medical treatment. In Lake Worth, 25 people were treated for various injuries at the Gulf Stream Hotel and the local fire station. Dr. W. A. Claxton, chief of the Miami Department of Public Welfare, requested antitoxin, typhoid serum, and at least 200 tetanus serums. There was also a request for 1,000 more cots in West Palm Beach and Kelsey City.

A total of 3,390 American Red Cross volunteers across the United States assisted with relief efforts. Overall, individual contributions to the organization reached almost $5.9 million, while the American Red Cross itself spent about $50,000 of its own funds on relief efforts. More than $1.1 million in contributions came from the state of New York alone. American Red Cross expenditures included about $1.3 million for building and repairs, $346,300 for household goods, $157,300 for clothing, $137,000 for food, $121,200 for agricultural supplies and equipment, $115,500 for family aid and service registration, $115,000 for field expenses, $83,200 for general tool and equipment expenses, $71,800 for medical services, $66,800 for grants to local chapters, $60,300 for relief camps, $45,900 for rescue work, $39,800 for boarding and lodging of storm victims, $19,900 for other miscellaneous expenses, $11,000 for the transportation of storm victims, and $5,000 for the Junior Red Cross. Many local Red Cross chapters throughout Florida sheltered refugees, donated goods and supplies, or otherwise provided assistance to storm victims. The American Red Cross was criticized for claims of skimping on aid given to some people and even accused of racial discrimination, including a relief committee chairwoman telling The Chicago Defender that only 20% of relief was being dispersed to African Americans. However, the American Red Cross, The Salvation Army, and Mary McLeod Bethune denied these claims in a telegraph to the National Association for the Advancement of Colored People (NAACP).

In October 1928 alone, permits for repair work projects exceeding $2 million were approved for Palm Beach and West Palm Beach, with the latter issuing 3,165 permits for building and major repairs between October 1 and June 30, 1929. Some towns along the shores of Lake Okeechobee slowly rebuilt, such as Belle Glade, where the population grew significantly due to people searching for work in the agricultural and natural resources industries during the Great Depression. However, other localities such as Chosen, Fruitcrest, and Okeelanta, never recovered from the storm. In Martin County, plans to build a Hollywood-esque city called Picture City fell through following the 1928 hurricane and subsequent economic collapse.

==== Racial issues ====
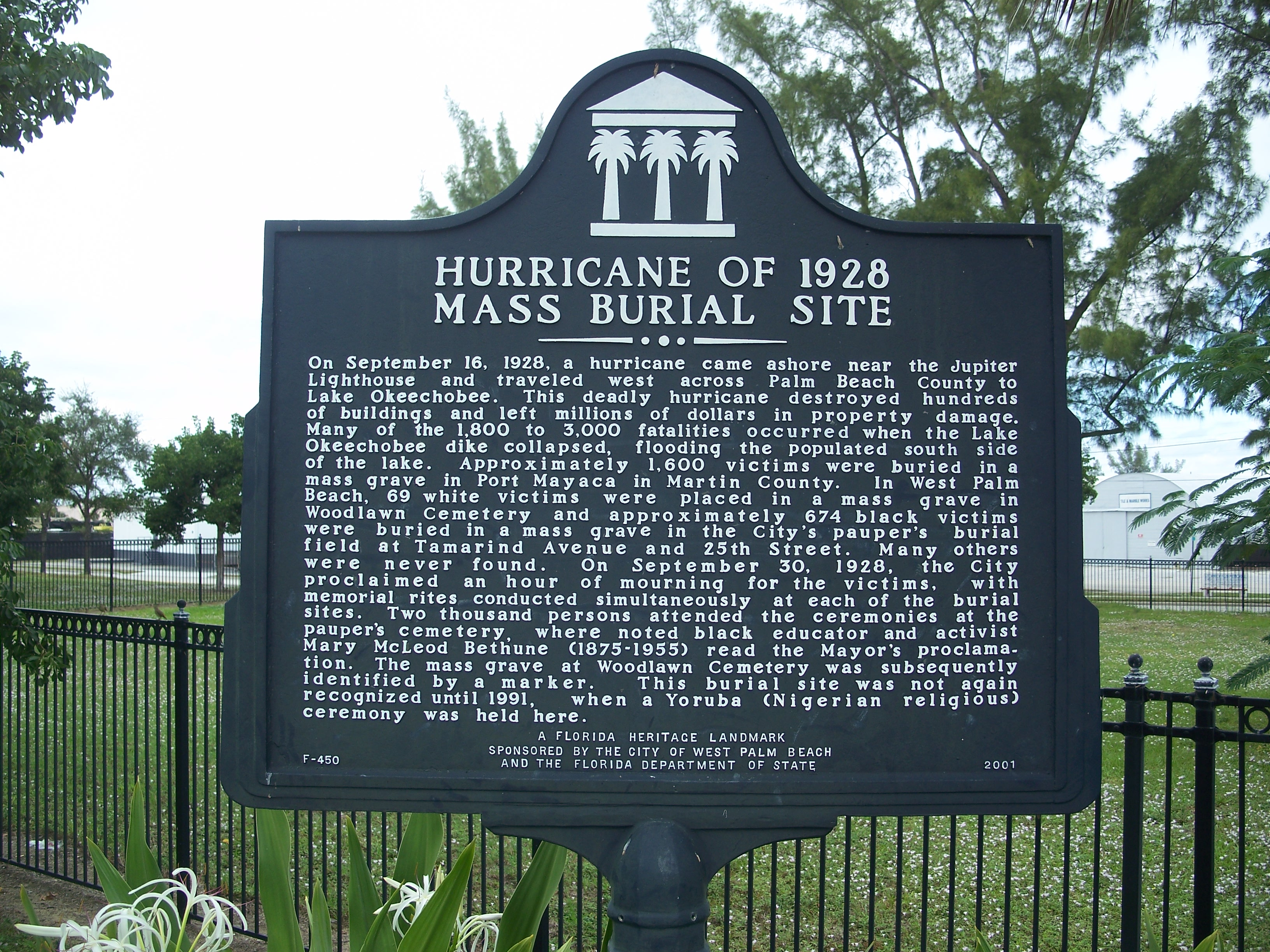
The historical marker added to the memorial site in 2003, the seventy-fifth anniversary of the storm

In Florida, although the hurricane's destruction affected everything in its path, the death toll was by far the highest and the aftermath the worst in the economically poor areas in the low-lying ground near Lake Okeechobee, such as the towns of Belle Glade, Chosen, Pahokee, South Bay, and Bean City. Around 75% of the fatalities were among migrant farm workers, most of whom were black.

The black workers did most of the post-hurricane cleanup work. Reflecting racial and class discrimination, authorities reserved the few caskets available for burials for the bodies of whites. White victims received a formal burial service, although in a mass grave, at Woodlawn Cemetery in downtown West Palm Beach. This was the only mass gravesite to receive a timely memorial.

In contrast, the bodies of black victims were burned in funeral pyres or thrown into mass burial sites such as the ones in West Palm Beach and Port Mayaca.

Robert Hazard, a resident of West Palm Beach, established the Storm of '28 Memorial Park Coalition Inc. to fight for recognition of the black victims of the storm. In 2000, the West Palm Beach burial site was reacquired by the city of West Palm Beach and plans for construction of a memorial began. The site was listed on the U.S. National Register of Historic Places in 2002 and a state historical marker was added in 2003 during events to commemorate the 75th anniversary of the hurricane.

African-American writer Zora Neale Hurston explored the effects of the hurricane on black migrant workers in her seminal 1937 novel, Their Eyes Were Watching God. This is her best-known work and it was included on TIME magazine's 2005 list of the '100 best English-language novels published since 1923'.

==== Improved building codes ====
In the aftermath of the hurricane in coastal Florida, observers noted that well-constructed buildings with shutters had suffered practically no damage from winds that caused serious structural problems to lesser buildings. Buildings with well-constructed frames, and those made of steel, concrete, brick, or stone, were largely immune to winds. The use of shutters prevented damage to windows and the interior of the buildings. With the 1928 hurricane coming so soon after the 1926 Miami hurricane, where a similar pattern had been noticed, one lasting result of the 1928 storm was improved state and local building codes.

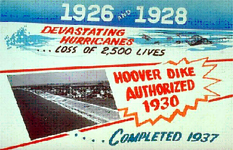
A sign advertising the completion of the Hoover Dike

==== Flood control ====
To prevent a recurrence of disasters like this one and the Great Miami Hurricane of 1926, the Florida State Legislature created the Okeechobee Flood Control District, which was authorized to cooperate with the U.S. Army Corps of Engineers in flood control undertakings. After a personal inspection of the area by President Herbert Hoover, the Corps of Engineers drafted a plan to provide for the construction of floodway channels, control gates, and major levees along the shores of Lake Okeechobee. A long-term system was designed for the purpose of flood control, water conservation, prevention of saltwater intrusion, and preservation of fish and wildlife populations. One of the solutions was the construction of the Herbert Hoover Dike.

In the early 21st century, there are concerns related to the dike's stability because studies have indicated long-term problems with "piping" and erosion. Leaks have been reported after several heavy rain events. Proposed solutions to the dike's problems have included the construction of a seepage berm on the landward side of the dike, with the first stage costing approximately $67 million (US$).

== Name ==
The storm was named the San Felipe II hurricane in Puerto Rico because the eye of the cyclone made landfall there on September 13, the Roman Catholic feast day of Saint Philip, father of Saint Eugenia of Rome. (King Philip II of Spain happened to die on this day.) It was named "Segundo", Spanish for "the Second", because of the weaker but destructive "San Felipe hurricane" that had struck Puerto Rico on that same day in 1876.

In Puerto Rico, since European colonization, storms and hurricanes were named after the name of the saint's day that the storm hit the island. For example, they named the Great Hurricane of 1780 as San Calixto, after Saint Callixtus, whose feast day is October 14; the 1867 San Narciso hurricane, the 1899 San Ciriaco hurricane, and the 1932 San Ciprian hurricane were also named after the saints' feast days on which they occurred (respectively, Saint Narcissus of Jerusalem on October 29, Saint Cyriacus on August 8, and Saint Cyprian on September 26).

In 1953, the United States Weather Bureau (now the National Weather Service) started naming hurricanes by human female names until 1978. That year both gender names began to be used after control over naming was relinquished to the World Meteorological Organization. It was not until 1960 that Puerto Rico stopped naming hurricanes after saints. Two cyclones have been given both women's and saint's names: Hurricane Betsy (Santa Clara, August 12, 1956) and Hurricane Donna (San Lorenzo, September 5, 1960).

== See also ==
- List of disasters in the United States by death toll
- Lists of Atlantic hurricanes
- List of Category 5 Atlantic hurricanes
- List of Florida hurricanes
- Hurricane Irma (2017) – An extremely intense Category 5 hurricane that followed a similar path, causing widespread devastation

== Notes ==
Preceded by 1926 Great Miami	Costliest Atlantic hurricanes on Record; 1928 (Tied with 1926 Great Miami)	Succeeded by 1938 New England (Long Island Express)
