= List of Florida hurricanes =

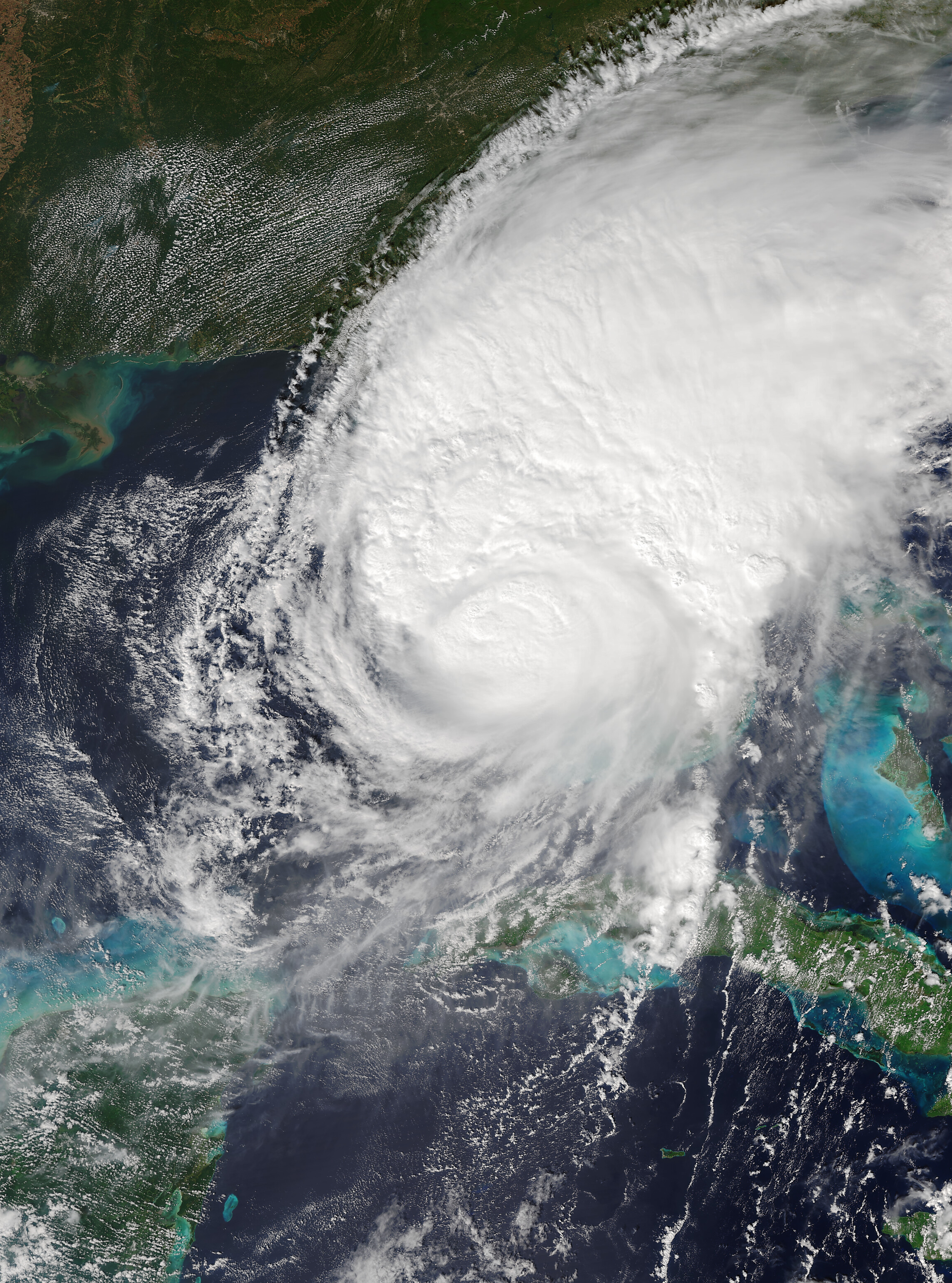
Hurricane Milton, the most recent landfalling Florida major hurricane on October 9, 2024

Approximately 500 tropical and subtropical cyclones have affected the state of Florida. More storms hit Florida than any other U.S. state, and since 1851 only eighteen hurricane seasons passed without a known storm impacting the state. Collectively, cyclones that hit the region have resulted in over 10,000 deaths, most of which occurred prior to the start of hurricane hunter flights in 1943. Additionally, the cumulative impact from the storms has totaled over US$397 billion in damage (2026 dollars), primarily from Hurricane Andrew, Hurricane Irma and Hurricane Ian in the 1992, 2017, and 2022 seasons respectively. The most recent hurricane to make landfall in Florida was Hurricane Isaias in 2026.

== Climatology ==
Tropical cyclones have affected Florida in every month of the year with the exceptions of January and March. Nearly one-third of the cyclones affected the state in September, and nearly three-fourths of the storms affected the state between August and October, which coincides with the peak of the hurricane season. Portions of the coastline have return periods, or expected time between hurricane strikes of a certain intensity or category within 86 miles (138 km) of a given location, that are the lowest in the country. Monroe County was struck by 26 hurricanes since 1926, which is the greatest total for any county in the United States.

In a Monthly Weather Review paper published in 1934, the U.S. Weather Bureau recognized Key West and Pensacola as the most hurricane-prone cities in the state; Key West experiences both storms developing from the western Atlantic Ocean and the Caribbean, while Pensacola has received hurricanes crossing the state as well as storms recurving in the northern Gulf of Mexico. The earliest hurricane to affect the state was Hurricane Alma on June 9; the latest, Hurricane Kate on November 21. Preliminary reanalysis suggests that a hurricane may have struck the state on May 28, 1863.

The strongest tropical cyclone to make landfall on the state was the 1935 Labor Day hurricane, which crossed the Florida Keys with a pressure of 892 millibars (26.3 inHg); it is also the strongest hurricane on record to strike the United States. Out of the ten most intense landfalling United States hurricanes, four struck Florida at peak strength.

== Pre-1900 ==
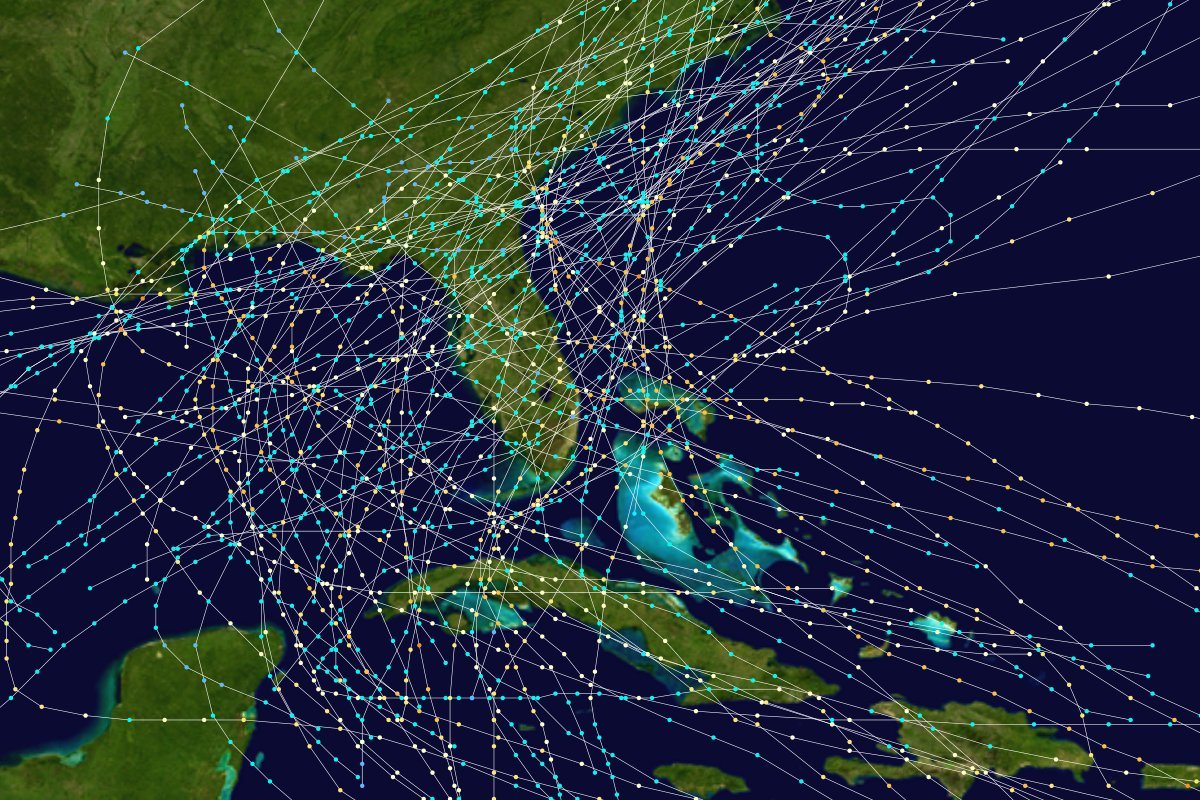
Tracks of hurricanes over Florida from 1851 to 1899

The first recorded tropical cyclone to affect the area that is now the state of Florida occurred in 1523, when two ships and their crews were lost along the western coastline. A total 159 hurricanes are known to have affected the state prior to 1900, which collectively resulted in at least 6,504 fatalities and monetary damage of over $138 million (2026 dollars). Additionally, at least 109 boats or ships were either driven ashore, wrecked, or damaged due to the storms. A strong hurricane struck northwest Florida on May 28, 1863, and is the earliest landfall during the year known in the US, pending reanalysis.

Information is sparse for earlier years due to limitations in tropical cyclone observation, though as coastlines became more populated, more data became available. The National Hurricane Center recognizes the uncertainty in both the death tolls and the dates of the events.

== 1900–1949 ==
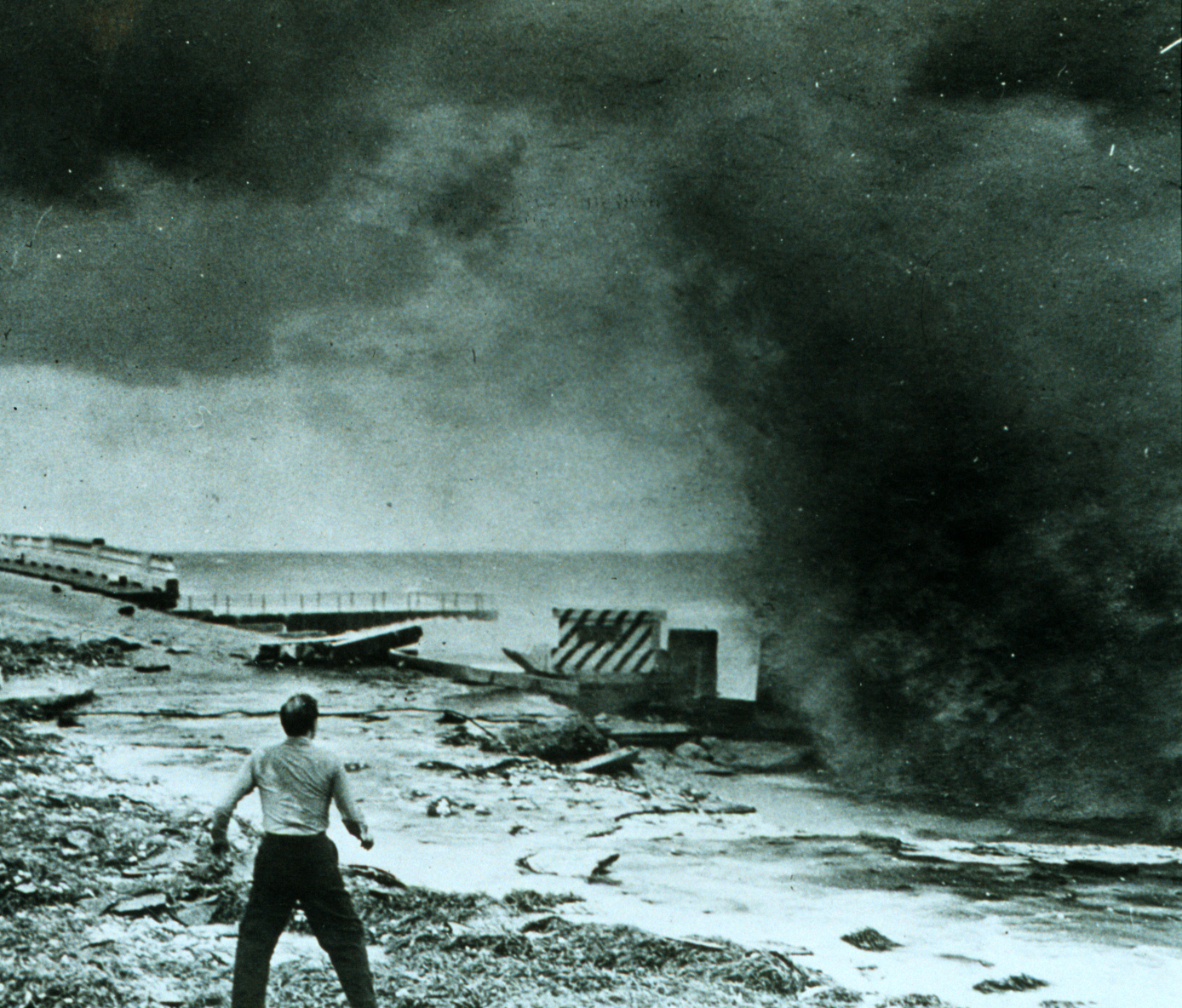
Surf from 1947 Fort Lauderdale hurricane

In the period between 1900 and 1949, 108 tropical cyclones affected the state, which collectively resulted in nearly $6 billion (2026 dollars) in damage. Additionally, tropical cyclones in Florida were directly responsible for about 3,500 fatalities during the period, most of which were from the 1928 Okeechobee hurricane, the state's deadliest. The 1947 season was the year with the most tropical cyclones affecting the state, with a total of six systems. The 1905, 1908, 1913, 1927, 1931, 1942, and 1943 seasons were the only years during the period in which a storm did not affect the state.

The strongest and most intense hurricane to hit the state during the period was the 1935 Labor Day hurricane—the most potent on record to strike the United States. Collectively this storm, the 1926 Miami hurricane, and the 1928 hurricane claimed over 3,280 lives in Florida—three of the state's 10 most impactful weather events in the 20th century; the 1926 storm would be the costliest of any U.S. hurricane in present monetary values. Hurricane-wise the 1940s were among the state's busiest decades: 11 hurricanes struck from 1944–50, six of them major, including five Category 4 hurricanes in South Florida. Storms catalyzed development: impacts radiated societally, broaching complex political and socioeconomic topics, and lead to epochal changes such as flood control and building codes.

== 1950–1974 ==
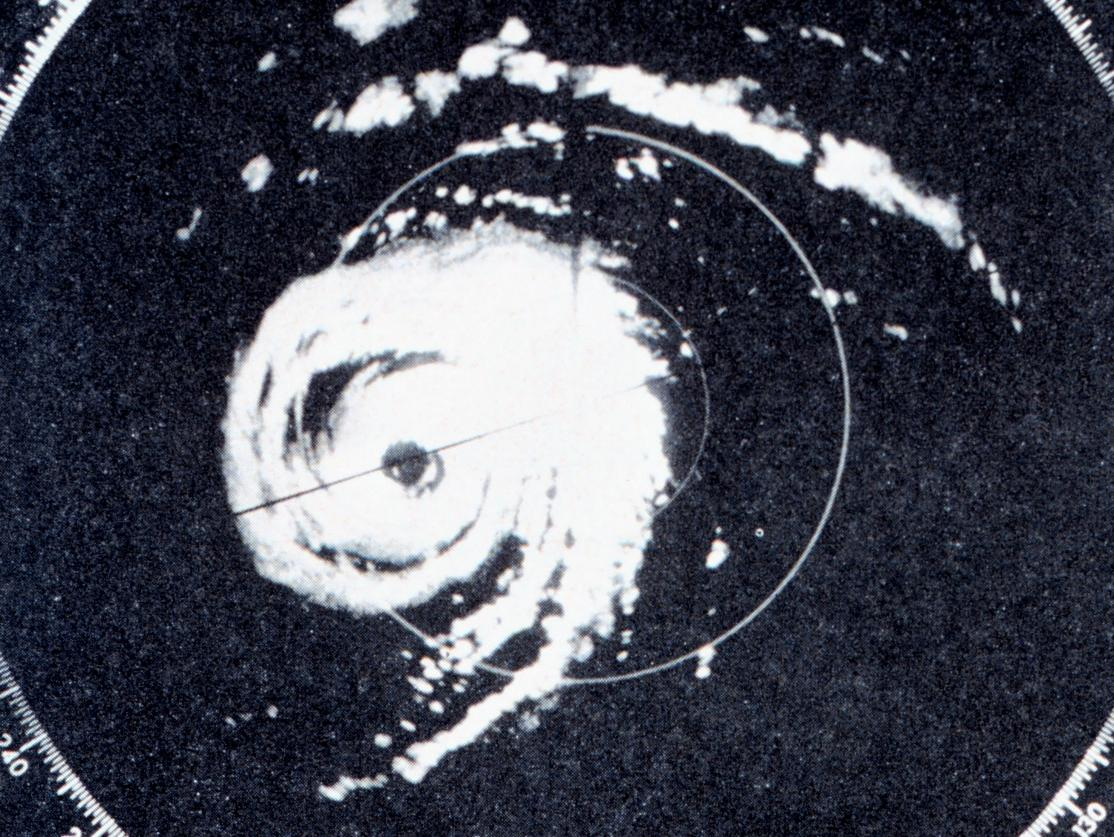
Radar image of Hurricane Donna making landfall

In the period between 1950 and 1974, 85 tropical or subtropical cyclones impacted the state, which collectively resulted in over $9 billion (2026 dollars) in damage, primarily from Hurricanes Donna, Hurricane Cleo (1964) and Dora. Additionally, the storms were directly responsible for 93 fatalities and indirectly for 23 more deaths. Several tropical cyclones produced over 20 inches (500 mm) of rainfall in the state, including Hurricane Easy, which is the highest total during the period. The 1969 season was the year with the most tropical cyclones affecting the state, with a total of eight systems. The 1954 and 1967 seasons were the only years during the period in which a storm did not affect the state.

The strongest hurricane to hit the state during the period was Hurricane Donna. Additionally, Hurricanes Easy, King, Betsy, and Alma hit or otherwise impacted the state as major hurricanes.

== 1975–1999 ==
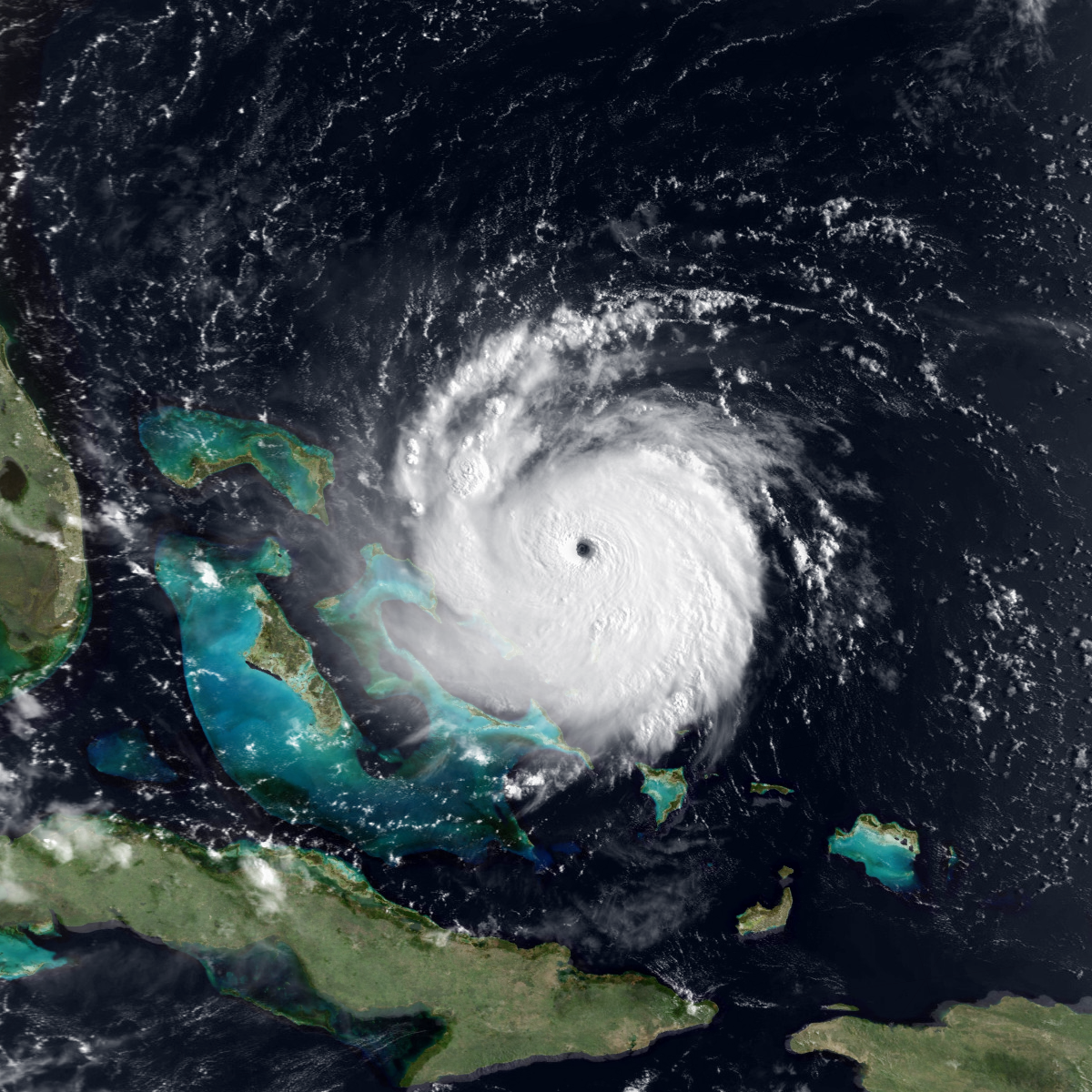
Hurricane Andrew approaching South Florida in August 1992.

In the period between 1975 and 1999, 83 tropical or subtropical cyclones affected the state, which collectively resulted over $67 billion (2026 dollars) in damage, primarily from Hurricane Andrew, and 54 direct casualties. The 1985 season was the year with the most tropical cyclones affecting the state, with a total of eight systems. Every year included at least one tropical cyclone affecting the state. The strongest hurricane to hit the state during the period was Hurricane Andrew, which was one of only four Category 5 hurricanes to strike the United States. Andrew, at the time, was the costliest tropical cyclone in United States history. Additionally, Hurricanes Eloise, Elena, and Opal hit or otherwise impacted the state as major hurricanes.

== 2000–present ==
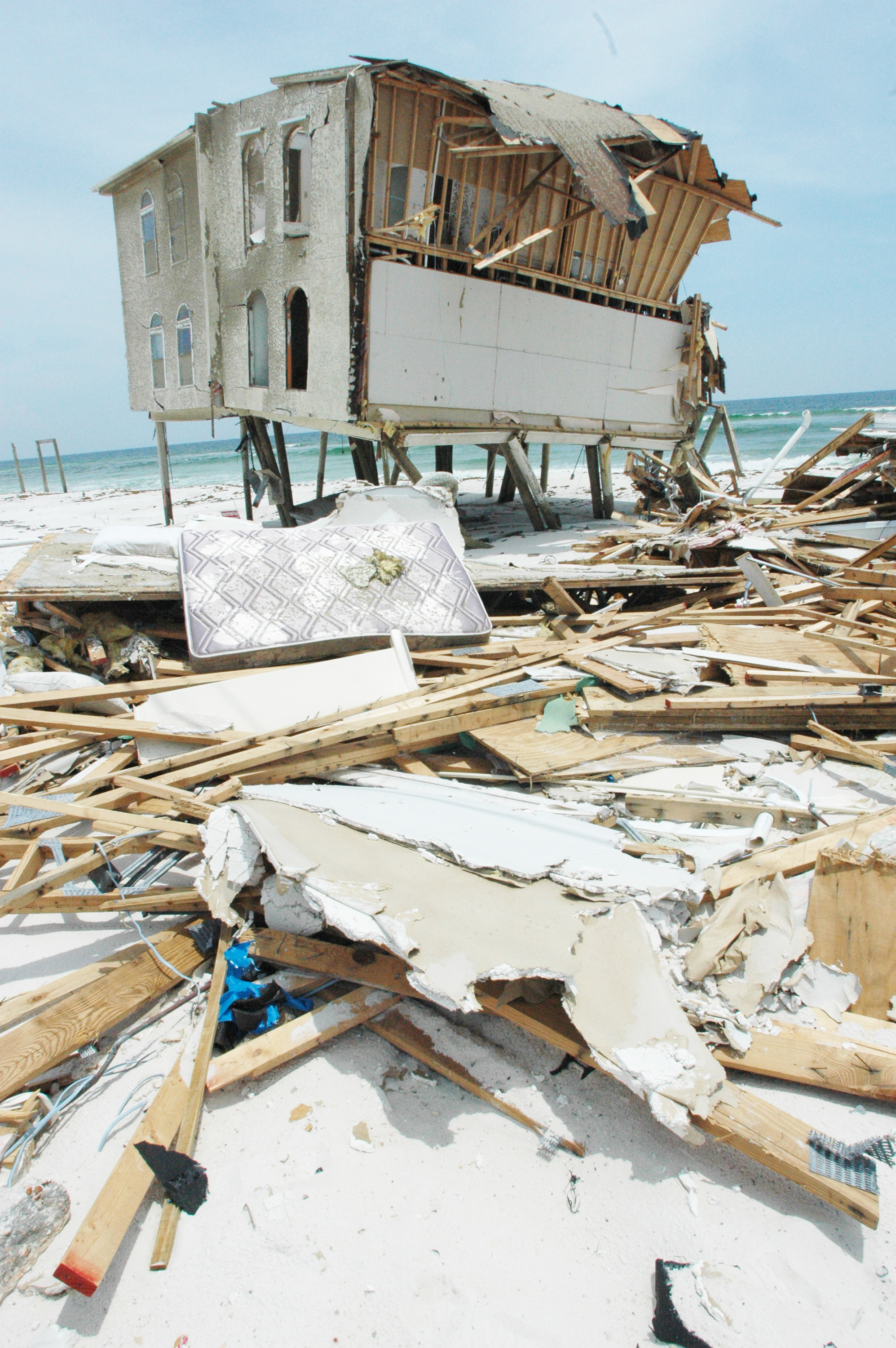
A beachfront home in Navarre Beach largely destroyed by Hurricane Dennis

The period from 2000 to the present has been marked by several devastating North Atlantic hurricanes; as of 2026, 83 tropical or subtropical cyclones have affected the U.S. state of Florida. From 2000 to 2022, cyclones in Florida resulted in over $236 billion in damage, most of it from Hurricane Ian. Additionally, tropical cyclones in Florida were responsible for 145 direct fatalities and at least 92 indirect fatalities from 2000 to 2022. Eight cyclones affected the state in both 2004 and 2005, which were the years with the most tropical cyclones impacting the state. Nearly every year since 2000 have included at least one tropical cyclone affecting the state. 2025 is the most recent year that no tropical cyclone made landfall in Florida.

The strongest hurricane to hit the state during the period was Michael, which made landfall in Florida as a Category 5 hurricane–the strongest since Andrew in 1992. Additionally, nine other hurricanes made landfall on or otherwise impacted the state as major hurricanes.

== Florida major hurricanes ==
The following major hurricanes either made landfall on the state as a major hurricane or brought winds of Category 3 status to the state. For storms that made landfall twice or more, the maximum sustained wind speed, and hence the highest Saffir–Simpson category, at the strongest landfall is listed. Only landfalls at major hurricane intensity are listed. Storms are listed since 1851, which is the official start of the Atlantic hurricane database. Originally, hurricanes were classified by central pressure in the 20th century; however, modern practices quantify storm intensities by maximum sustained winds. United States hurricanes are still classified by central pressure from 1971 to 1979; therefore, the maximum sustained winds in the Atlantic hurricane database (HURDAT) are used for storms from 1971 to 1979, since this period has not been reanalyzed by the Atlantic hurricane reanalysis project.

Florida major hurricanes
Storm	Saffir–Simpson Category†	Date of Impact (UTC)	Year	Landfall Winds			Pressure		Location(s)
Storm	Saffir–Simpson Category†	Date of Impact (UTC)	Year	knots	mph	km/h	mbar (hPa)	inHg	Location(s)
Great Middle Florida	3	August 23	1851	100	115	185	950‡	28.05‡	Panama City
Unnamed	3	August 17	1871	100	115	185	955	28.20	Jupiter Island
Unnamed	3	October 7	1873	100	115	185	959	28.32	Captiva Island
Unnamed	3	October 3	1877	100	115	185	955‡	28.20‡	West of Mexico Beach
Unnamed	3	September 10	1882	110	125	205	949	28.02	Wynnehaven Beach
Louisiana	3	August 16	1888	110	125	205	945‡	27.91‡	Miami Beach
Florida Panhandle	3	October 9	1894	105	120	195	950‡	28.05‡	Parker
Cedar Keys	3	September 29	1896	110	125	205	960	28.35	Northwest of Cedar Key
Florida Keys	3	October 18	1906	105	120	195	953	28.14	Marathon; East of Flamingo
Florida Keys	3	October 11	1909	100	115	185	957	28.26	Key Colony Beach
Nueva Gerona	3	September 29	1917	100	115	185	949	28.02	Fort Walton Beach
Florida Keys	4	September 10	1919	130	150	240	927	27.37	Dry Tortugas
Tampa Bay	3	October 25	1921	100	115	185	958	28.29	Tarpon Springs
Great Miami	4	September 18–20	1926	125	145	230	930	27.46	Cutler
Okeechobee	4	September 17	1928	125	145	230	929	27.43	Palm Beach
Bahamas	3	September 28	1929	100	115	185	948	27.99	Tavernier
Treasure Coast	3	September 4	1933	110	125	205	948	27.99	Juno Beach
Labor Day	5	September 3	1935	160	185	295	892	26.34	Craig Key
Cuba–Florida	3	October 18	1944	105	120	195	949	28.02	Dry Tortugas
Homestead	4	September 15	1945	115	130	215	949	28.02	North Key Largo; Homestead
Fort Lauderdale (George)	4	September 17	1947	115	130	215	943	27.85	Fort Lauderdale
September 1948 Florida (Easy)	4	September 21–22	1948	115	130	215	940	27.76	Saddlebunch Keys; East of Chokoloskee
Florida	4	August 26	1949	115	130	215	954	28.17	Lake Worth
Easy	3	September 5	1950	105	120	195	960	28.35	Northwest of Yankeetown
King	4	October 18	1950	115	130	215	955	28.20	Miami
Donna	4	September 10	1960	125	145	230	930	27.46	Conch Key; Goodland
Betsy	3	September 8	1965	100	115	185	952	28.11	Tavernier
Alma	3	June 8	1966	100	115	185	962	28.41	Dry Tortugas*
Eloise	3	September 23	1975	110	125	205	950	28.05	Miramar Beach
Elena	3	September 2	1985	100	115	185	959	28.32	Gulfport, Mississippi*
Andrew	5	August 24	1992	145	165	270	922	27.23	Elliott Key; North of Homestead
Opal	3	October 4	1995	100	115	185	942	27.82	Pensacola Beach (Santa Rosa Island)
Charley	4	August 13	2004	130	150	240	941	27.79	Cayo Costa; Punta Gorda
Ivan	3	September 16	2004	105	120	195	946	27.94	West of Gulf Shores, Alabama*
Jeanne	3	September 26	2004	105	120	195	950	28.05	Hutchinson Island
Dennis	3	July 10	2005	105	120	195	946	27.94	Pensacola Beach (Santa Rosa Island)
Wilma	3	October 24	2005	105	120	195	950	28.05	Cape Romano
Irma	4	September 10	2017	115	130	215	931	27.49	Cudjoe Key; Marco Island
Michael	5	October 10	2018	140	160	260	919	27.14	West of Mexico Beach
Ian	4	September 28	2022	130	150	240	941	27.79	Cayo Costa; Punta Gorda
Idalia	3	August 30	2023	100	115	185	950	28.05	Keaton Beach
Helene	4	September 27	2024	120	140	220	939	27.73	Southwest of Perry
Milton	3	October 9	2024	100	115	185	958	28.29	Siesta Key°
References: HURDAT, HRD
† Peak winds in the state.
‡ Value derived from pressure–wind relationship, not directly sampled.
* Storm hit at a lower category or did not make landfall in Florida, but brought major hurricane winds there.
° Storm made landfall with given wind speed but strongest winds remained offshore.

=== Strongest and most intense ===
Strongest landfalling tropical cyclones in the U.S. state of Florida by maximum sustained wind speed as of 2024
Rank	Hurricane	Season	Wind speed	
Rank	Hurricane	Season	mph	km/h
1	"Labor Day"	1935	185	295
2	Andrew	1992	165	270
3	Michael	2018	160	260
4	"Florida Keys"	1919	150	240
4	Charley	2004	150	240
4	Ian	2022	150	240
7	"Great Miami"	1926	145	230
7	"Okeechobee"	1928	145	230
7	Donna	1960	145	230
10	Helene	2024	140	220
Source: HURDAT, Hurricane Research Division, NHC

Most intense landfalling tropical cyclones in the U.S. state of Florida by central barometric pressure as of 2024
Rank	System	Season	Barometric pressure
1	"Labor Day"	1935	892 mbar (hPa)
2	Michael	2018	919 mbar (hPa)
3	Andrew	1992	922 mbar (hPa)
4	"Florida Keys"	1919	927 mbar (hPa)
5	"Okeechobee"	1928	929 mbar (hPa)
6	"Great Miami"	1926	930 mbar (hPa)
6	Donna	1960	930 mbar (hPa)
8	Irma	2017	931 mbar (hPa)
9	Helene	2024	939 mbar (hPa)
10	"Florida"	1948	940 mbar (hPa)
Source: HURDAT, Hurricane Research Division

==== "Great", "Major", and "Extreme" hurricanes ====
Saffir–Simpson rankings were given United States storms beginning in 1975, first on the basis of pressure, then on wind alone since the late 1980s; informal metrics gauged intensity prior. A "Great Hurricane" contained winds over 125 mph (200 km/h) and spread hurricane-force winds over 100 miles (160 km) or more, while also generating high tides, low pressures, extensive damage, and casualties. A "Major" hurricane featured winds of 101–135 mph (163–217 km/h) and a barometric pressure of 28.01 to 29.00 inHg (949 to 982 mb); an "Extreme" hurricane, at least 136 mph (219 km/h)—roughly equivalent to Category 4 on the Saffir–Simpson scale—and 28.00 inHg (948 mb) or lower. From 1880 to 1960 the following Florida storms have been classified as "Great", "Major", and/or "Extreme":

"Great", "Major", and "Extreme" hurricanes in Florida
Storm	Year	Date	Area Affected	"Great"?	"Major"?	"Extreme"?	SS Rank in Florida	Miscellany	Ref.
Unnamed	1559	September 19	Pensacola	No	Yes	No	—N/a	One of first hurricanes noted in Florida	
Unnamed	1736	—N/a	Pensacola	No	Yes	No	—N/a	Pensacola in ruins	
Unnamed	1759	September	South Florida	No	Yes	No	—N/a	Spawned high tides between Dry Tortugas and present-day Miami	
Unnamed	1766	October 22	St. Marks	No	Yes	No	—N/a	12-foot-high (3.7 m) tide reported	
Unnamed	1843	September 13	Port St. Joe	No	Yes	No	3–4	Port St. Joe leveled	
Havana	1846	October 11–12	Key West–Cedar Key	No	No	Yes	4–5	Key West wrecked	
Tampa Bay	1848	September 25	Tampa Bay (Fort Brooke)	No	Yes	No	4–5	Caused 15-foot (4.6 m) tide at Tampa	
Unnamed	1873	October 5–7	Punta Rassa	No	Yes	No	3	Produced 14-foot (4.3 m) tide	
Unnamed	1880	August 28–29	Vero Beach, Palm Beach– Lake Okeechobee	Yes	Yes	No	2	Badly hit areas near present Palm Beach County	
Unnamed	1886	June 21	Apalachicola–Tallahassee	Yes	Yes	No	2	Generated extreme tides	
Great Charleston	1893	October 11–13	Coastal east peninsula	No	Yes	No	†	Gusted to 90 mph (140 km/h) and did high tides	
Greater Antilles	1894	September 25	Southwest Florida	No	Yes	No	2	Dropped 12 1/2 in (320 mm) of rain in a day	
Cedar Keys	1896	September 28–29	Cedar Key	No	Yes	No	3	Claimed over 100 lives	
Mississippi	1906	September 27	Pensacola*	No	Yes	No	2	Worst storm to hit Pensacola in 170 years	
Florida Keys	1906	October 18	Southeast Florida	No	Yes	No	3	Killed about 200 people	
Florida Keys	1909	October 11	Florida Keys	No	Yes	No	3	110 mph (180 km/h) clocked before anemometer disabled	
Cuba	1910	October 17–18	Key West; Fort Myers	Yes	Yes	No	2	Caused much flooding	
Gulf Coast	1916	July 5	Pensacola*	No	Yes	No	†	Gusted to 104 mph (167 km/h)	
Pensacola	1916	October 18	Pensacola	No	Yes	No	2	Gusted to 114 mph (183 km/h)	
Nueva Gerona	1917	September 28–29	Pensacola	No	Yes	No	3	Gusted to 103 mph (166 km/h)	
Florida Keys	1919	September 9–10	Key West	Yes	Yes	No	4	Strongest on record at Key West	
Tampa Bay	1921	October 25	West central peninsula	No	Yes	No	3	Most severe storm to hit Tampa in 70 years	
Great Miami	1926	September 18–20	Miami; Pensacola	Yes	No	Yes	4	Highest wind and lowest pressure sampled till then in U.S.	
Okeechobee	1928	September 16–17	Palm Beach–Lake Okeechobee, Florida peninsula	Yes	No	Yes	4	Deadliest Florida natural disaster; led to Herbert Hoover Dike	
Bahamas	1929	September 27 – October 1	Key Largo; Northwest Florida	No	No	Yes	3	Gusted to 150 mph (240 km/h)	
Treasure Coast	1933	September 3–4	Jupiter, Florida peninsula	No	Yes	No	3	Gusted to 125 mph (201 km/h)	
Labor Day	1935	September 2–4	Florida Keys; Taylor County	Yes	No	Yes	5	Gusts calculated at over 200 mph (320 km/h)	
Cuba–Florida	1944	October 18–19	Key West–Tampa–Jacksonville (peninsula)	Yes	Yes	No	3	Eye passage for five hours at some spots	
Richmond	1945	September 15–16	Homestead (NAS Richmond), far South Florida	No	No	Yes	4	Resembled 1992's Andrew; unofficial gust to 196 mph (315 km/h)	
Pompano Beach (George)	1947	September 17–18	Fort Lauderdale/Pompano– Fort Myers	Yes	No	Yes	4	Gusted to 155 mph (249 km/h)	
September 1948 Florida (Easy)	1948	September 22	Southern peninsula	No	Yes	No	4	Gusted to 122 mph (196 km/h)	
Delray Beach	1949	August 26–27	Delray Beach, South Florida	No	No	Yes	4	Resembled 1928 hurricane, gusted to 153 mph (246 km/h)	
Easy	1950	September 3–7	Cedar Key, peninsula	No	Yes	No	3	Was wettest tropical cyclone on record in Florida	
King	1950	October 17–18	Miami, peninsula	No	Yes	No	4	Delivered downtown Miami's strongest winds since 1926	
† Indicates winds were below hurricane force in the state.
* Storm made landfall outside Florida.

=== Monthly statistics ===
Number of recorded major hurricanes affecting Florida
Month	Number of major hurricanes
June	1
July	1
August	6
September	20
October	10

== Deadliest storms ==
Hurricanes causing 100 or more deaths in Florida
Name	Year	Number of deaths
Okeechobee	1928	2,500+
Unnamed	1781	2,000
Unnamed	1622	1,090
Unnamed	1553	700
Unnamed	1553	<700
Unnamed	1559	500
Unnamed	1559	~500
Unnamed	1683	496
Labor Day	1935	409
Great Miami	1926	372
Unnamed	1563	284
Florida Keys	1906	211+
Ian	2022	150

== See also ==
- Atlantic hurricane
- Climate of Florida
- Atlantic hurricane season
- List of Atlantic hurricanes
- List of wettest known tropical cyclones in Florida
- Tropical cyclone
