= Rebecca Shoal Light =

Lighthouse in Florida, United States

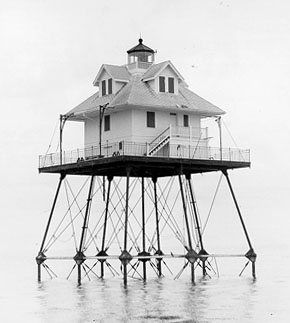
- The Rebecca Shoal Lighthouse after it was automated, with the lower landing decks removed.
- Location: East of Garden Key, Dry Tortugas
- Coordinates: 24°34′42″N 82°35′06″W

Tower
- Foundation: screw-pile
- Construction: Wood structure
- Automated: 1926
- Height: 66 feet (20 m)
- Shape: House on piles

Light
- First lit: 1886
- Deactivated: 1953
- Lens: Fourth order Fresnel lens
- Characteristic: White flash every 6 s (red sector covers the shoal)

The Rebecca Shoal Light was located on a treacherous coral bank, Rebecca Shoal, 6.2 miles (10 km) west of the Marquesas Keys and 31 miles (50 km) east of the Dry Tortugas.

== Overview and history ==
The bank has at least a depth of 11 feet (3.4 m) and is subject to strong currents and rough seas.

The first attempt to place a light on Rebecca Shoal was under the direction of Lt. George Meade starting in 1854. After structures were washed away twice in 1855 while still being erected, Meade wrote, "I believed then, and am satisfied now, that no light-house structure of any kind has been erected, either in this country or in Europe, at a position more exposed and offering greater obstacles than the Rebecca shoal."

A lighthouse was finally successfully erected on Rebecca Shoal in 1886. It was a 1 1/2-story square house set on high pilings. During bad weather, it was often impossible to land supplies or keepers at the lighthouse. The lighthouse withstood several hurricanes throughout the years. The 1919 Florida Keys Hurricane broke the glass in the lighthouse's lantern and damaged the lens. The Spanish steamer Valbanera sank in that same hurricane five miles east of Rebecca Shoal, with the loss of all 488 people aboard.

The lighthouse deteriorated after the light was automated in 1926, and was demolished in 1953. A skeletal tower was erected on the original pilings to hold the light. A new skeletal tower was built on new pilings in 1985, and the old tower and pilings were removed. The lantern from the old lighthouse eventually ended up mounted on a private lighthouse in Key Largo. In 2004, Hurricane Charley destroyed the new tower.

== Timeline of Keepers ==
- Mark Gaze 1886–1888
- James Gardner 1888–1889
- Francis McNulty 1889–1890
- Robert J. Fine 1890–1893
- John Watkins 1893–1895
- William R. Cook 1895–1896
- Charles H. Gardner 1896–1900
- James R. Walker 1900–1902
- Alfred A. Berghell 1902–1905)
- Arthur C.E. Hamblett 1905–1907
- John Peterson 1907–1908
- Arthur C.E. Hamblett 1908–1910
- Thomas M. Kelly 1910–1917
- Clifton H. Lopez 1917
- William Pierce 1917–1919
- Richard C. Roberts 1919
- Thomas L. Kelly 1919–?
- Robert V. Hall – at least 1921
- Alonzo Baker ?–1925
