= 1919 Florida Keys hurricane =

Category 4 Atlantic hurricane in 1919

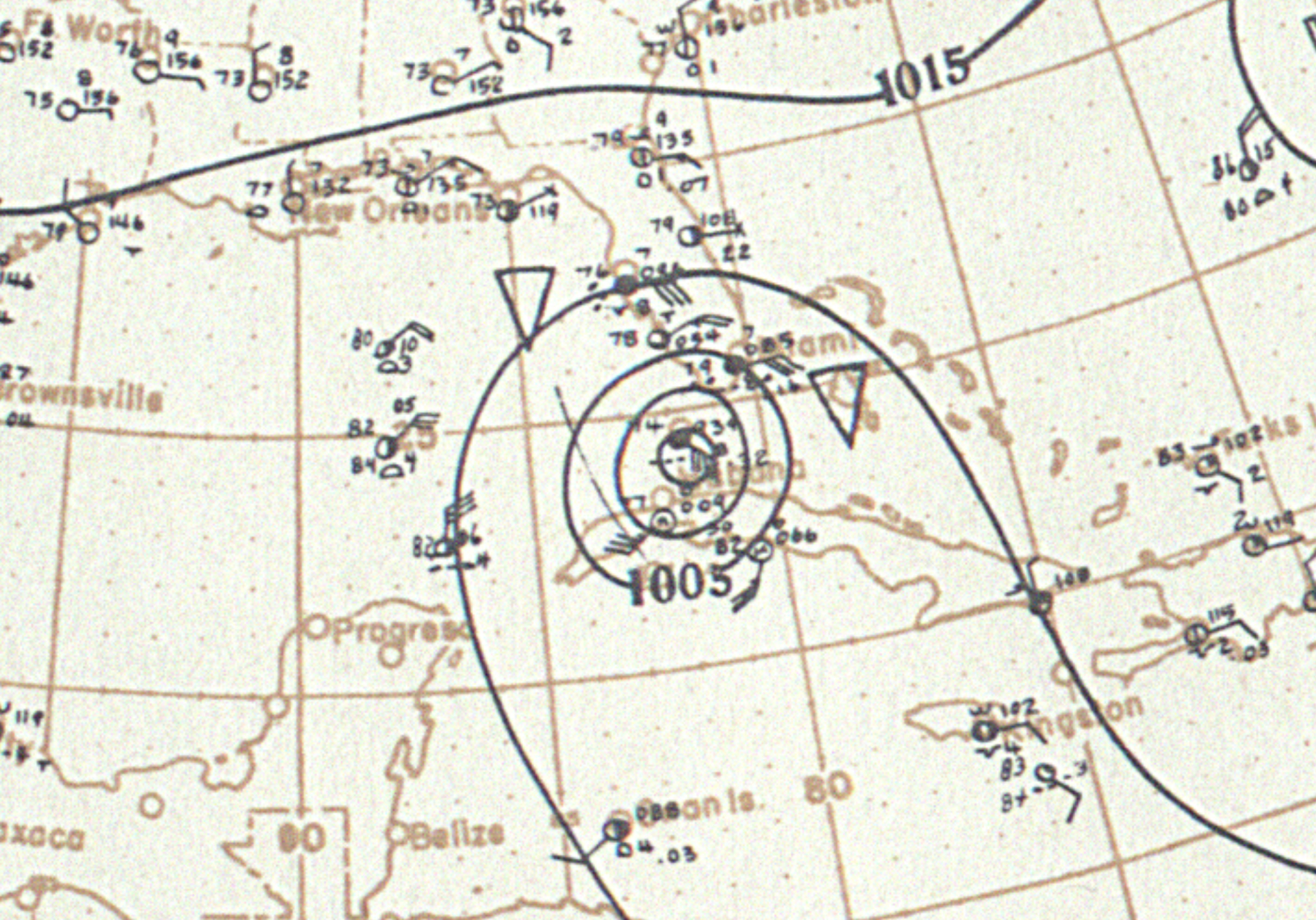
- Surface weather analysis of the hurricane over the Florida Keys on September 10

Meteorological history
- Formed: September 2, 1919
- Dissipated: September 16, 1919

Category 4 major hurricane
- 1-minute sustained (SSHWS/NWS)
- Highest winds: 150 mph (240 km/h)
- Lowest pressure: 927 mbar (hPa); 27.37 inHg

Overall effects
- Fatalities: 772
- Damage: $22 million (1919 USD) (Note: All monetary values in 1919 United States dollars unless otherwise noted.)
- Areas affected: Lesser Antilles, Puerto Rico, Hispaniola, Turks and Caicos, Bahamas, Cuba, Florida, Louisiana, Mississippi, Mexico, Texas, New Mexico
- IBTrACS
- Part of the 1919 Atlantic hurricane season

The 1919 Florida Keys hurricane (also known as the 1919 Key West hurricane) was a massive and damaging tropical cyclone that swept across areas of the northern Caribbean Sea and the United States Gulf Coast in September 1919. Remaining an intense Atlantic hurricane throughout much of its existence, the storm's slow movement and sheer size prolonged and enlarged the scope of the hurricane's effects, making it one of the deadliest hurricanes in United States history. Impacts were largely concentrated around the Florida Keys and South Texas areas, though lesser but nonetheless significant effects were felt in Cuba and other areas of the United States Gulf Coast. The hurricane's peak strength in Dry Tortugas in the lower Florida Keys made it one of the most powerful Atlantic hurricanes to make landfall in the United States.

The hurricane developed near the Leeward Islands as a tropical depression on September 2 and gradually gained in strength as it tracked on a generally west-northwesterly path, crossing the Mona Passage and moving across the Bahamas. On September 7, the storm reached hurricane intensity over the eastern Bahamas. On September 9–10, the storm made its eponymous pass of the Florida Keys, passing over the Dry Tortugas with an intensity equivalent to that of a modern-day Category 4 hurricane. Over the next several days, the intense cyclone traversed the Gulf of Mexico, fluctuating in strength before making landfall near Baffin Bay, Texas on September 14 as a large Category 3 hurricane. As it tracked further inland, land interaction caused the storm to gradually weaken; the storm was last noted on September 16 over West Texas.

== Meteorological history ==
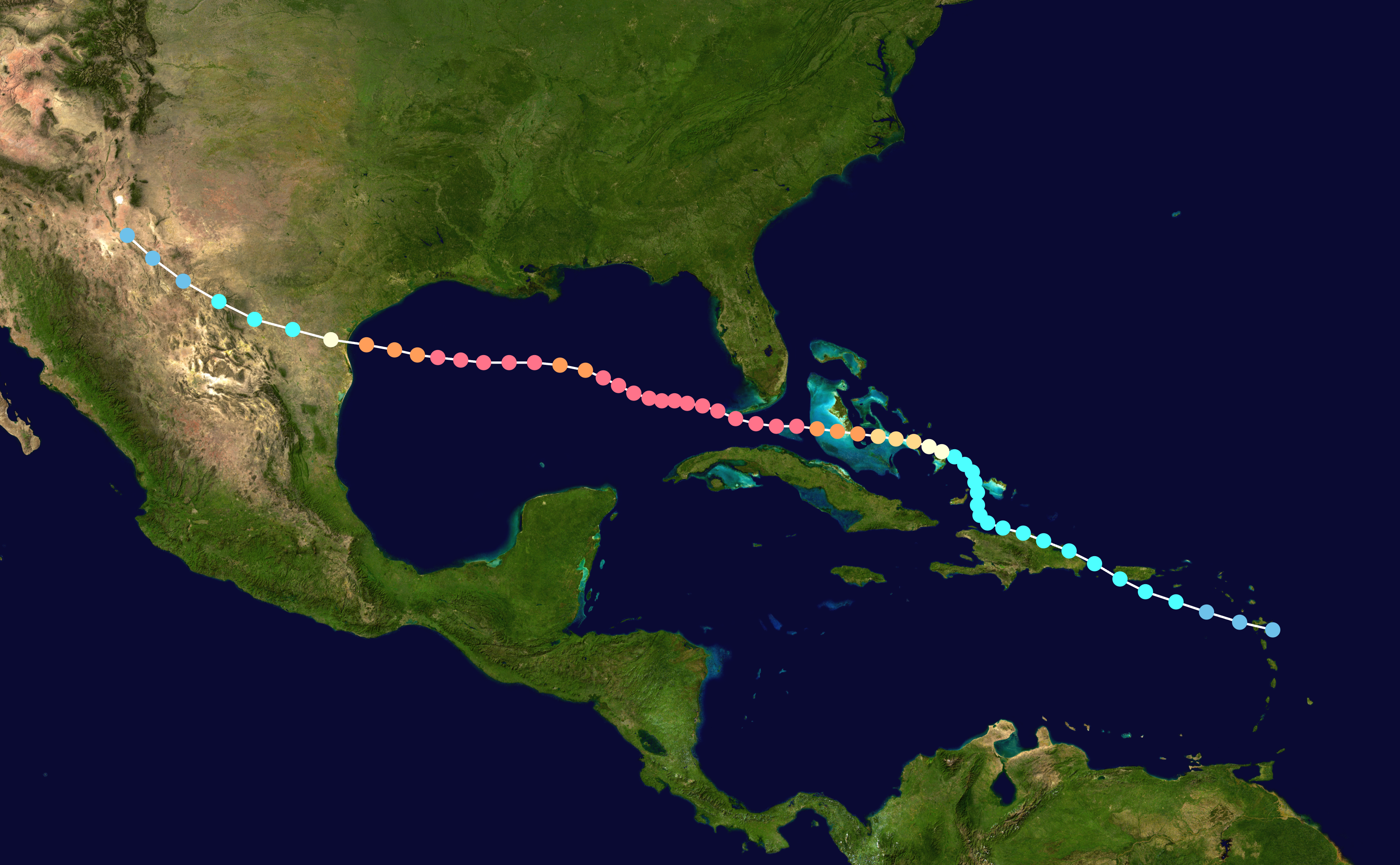
Map plotting the storm's track and intensity, according to the Saffir–Simpson scale Map key Saffir–Simpson scale Tropical depression (≤38 mph, ≤62 km/h) Tropical storm (39–73 mph, 63–118 km/h) Category 1 (74–95 mph, 119–153 km/h) Category 2 (96–110 mph, 154–177 km/h) Category 3 (111–129 mph, 178–208 km/h) Category 4 (130–156 mph, 209–251 km/h) Category 5 (≥157 mph, ≥252 km/h) Unknown Storm type Tropical cyclone Subtropical cyclone Extratropical cyclone, remnant low, tropical disturbance, or monsoon depression

Based on isolated observations east of the Lesser Antilles on September 1, the precursor to the 1919 Florida Keys hurricane may have been a disorganized tropical wave that tracked westward towards the Leeward Islands. The next day, additional observations indicated that the disturbance had acquired a cyclonic circulation; thus, the system was determined to have become a tropical depression by 12:00 UTC that day just east of Guadeloupe. Gradual strengthening occurred as the depression tracked west-northwest, attaining tropical storm intensity at 06:00 UTC on September 3. Twelve hours later, the tropical cyclone clipped the extreme-southwestern portion of Puerto Rico with maximum sustained winds of 50 mph (80 km/h). The cyclone maintained a low-end tropical storm intensity as it paralleled the northern coast of Hispaniola the following day. On September 6, the storm abruptly turned towards the north in the direction of the Turks and Caicos before resuming a more westerly trajectory a day later.

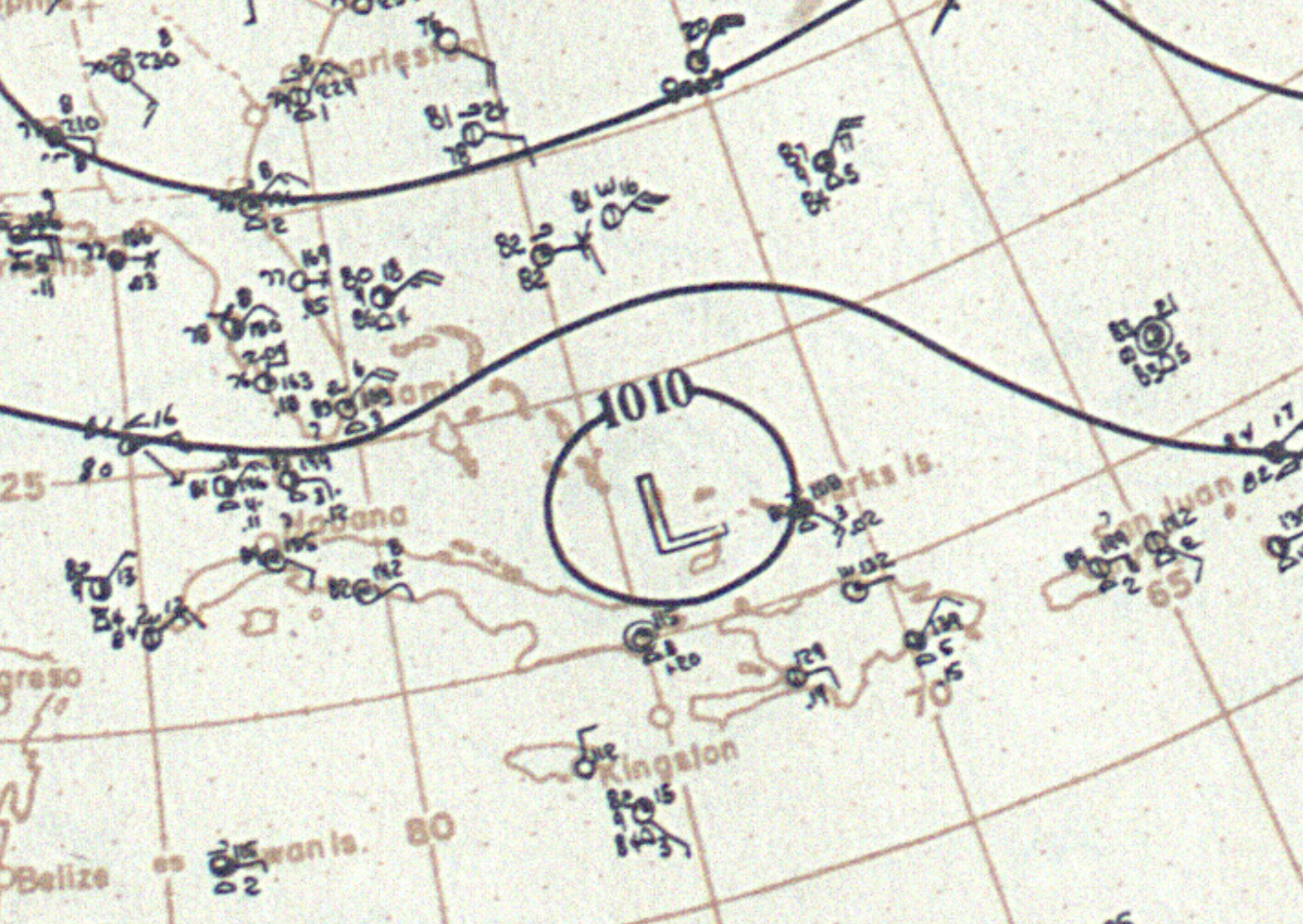
Synoptic weather map of the hurricane moving across the Bahamas on September 7

At 06:00 UTC on September 7, the cyclone strengthened to hurricane intensity north of Crooked Island. Traversing westward across the southern extents of the Bahamas, the newly developed hurricane steadily grew in size and intensity. September 7, the hurricane reached the equivalent of a Category 2 on the modern-day Saffir–Simpson scale and later reached major hurricane strength on September 8 shortly before crossing Andros Island. On September 9, the storm intensified further to Category 4 strength before passing roughly 30–40 mi (48–64 km) south of Key West, Florida in the Florida Straits.

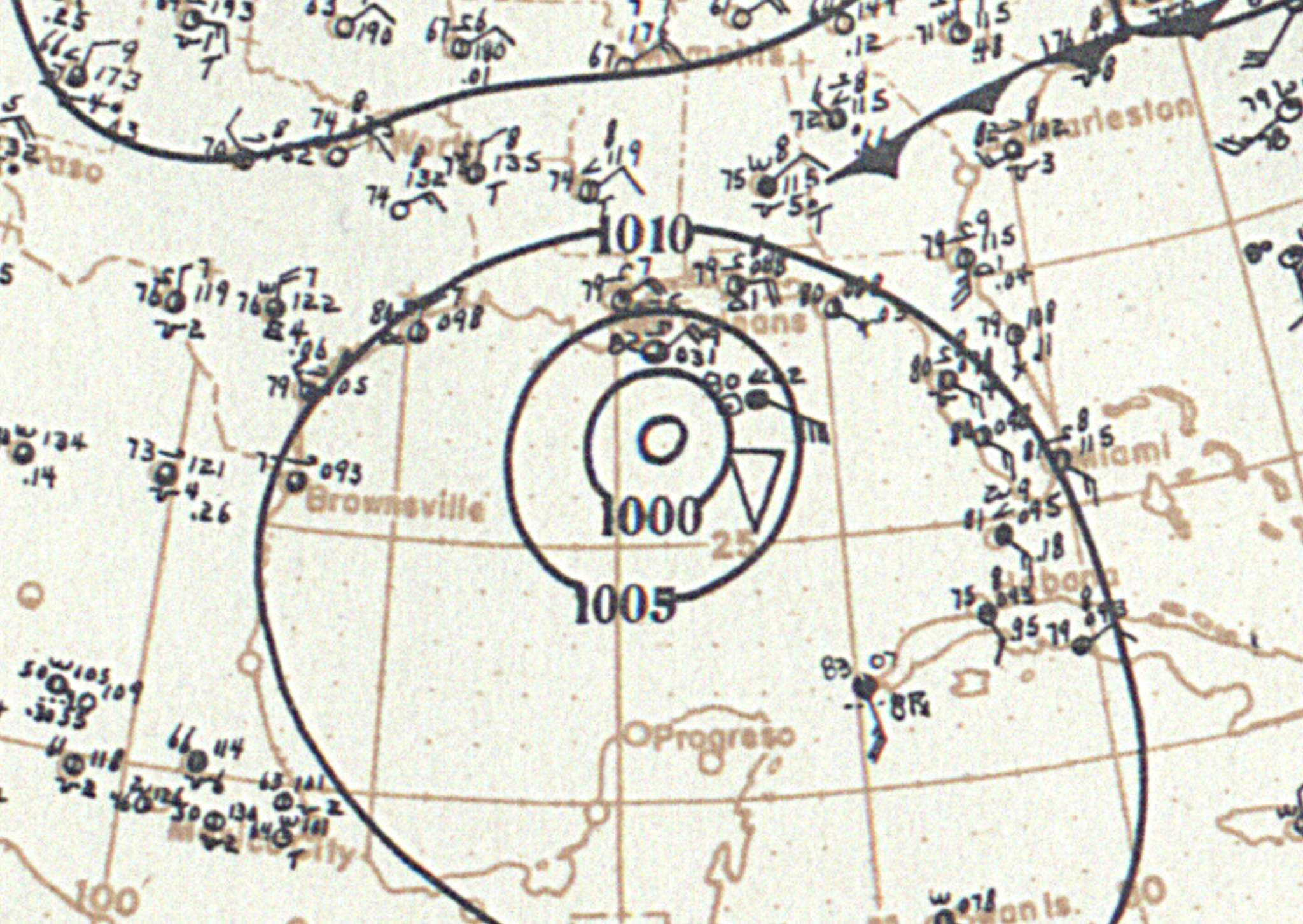
Synoptic weather map of the hurricane over the Gulf of Mexico on September 12

At 07:00 UTC on September 10, the hurricane made landfall on the Dry Tortugas at peak intensity with winds of 150 mph (240 km/h) extending as far as 17 mi (27 km) outwards from the center and a low barometric pressure of 927 mbar (hPa; 27.37 inHg) based on a barometer observation in the eye of the storm. At the time, this made the tropical cyclone the second strongest to strike the United States since 1851, only behind the 1886 Indianola hurricane. After landfall, the storm slowly moved westward into the Gulf of Mexico. From September 10 to September 14, the tropical cyclone traversed the Gulf of Mexico, maintaining a powerful intensity. On September 12, the hurricane briefly weakened to Category 3 intensity before restrengthening shortly thereafter. The following day, the storm reached a secondary peak intensity with winds of 145 mph (233 km/h) and a minimum pressure of 931 mbar (931 hPa; 27.5 inHg) over the western Gulf of Mexico before weakening precipitously afterwards.

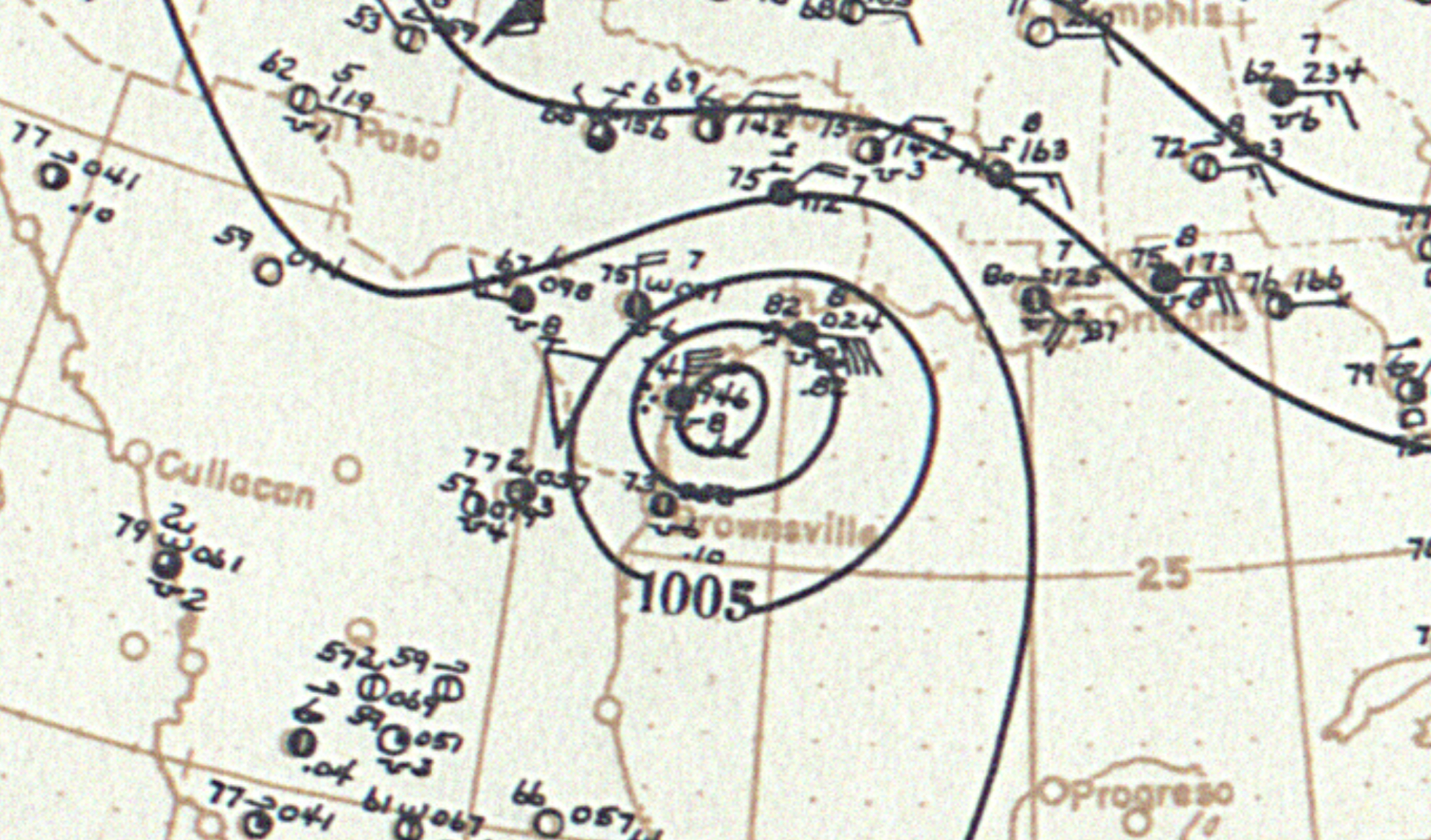
Synoptic weather map of the hurricane nearing landfall in Texas on September 14

At 21:00 UTC on September 14, the hurricane made its final landfall near Baffin Bay as a Category 3 hurricane with winds of 115 mph (185 km/h) and a central pressure of 950 mbar (950 hPa; 28 inHg). Upon moving ashore, the storm was unusually large; its radius of maximum winds measured 40 mi (64 km) compared to the average of 21 mi (34 km) for storms of similar intensities. As the hurricane tracked further inland, land interaction weakened the cyclone, with winds dropping below hurricane-force on September 15 and then below tropical storm-force the next day. By 18:00 UTC on September 16, the tropical cyclone had dissipated over West Texas, near the border between Texas and Mexico.

== Preparations ==
Due to the lack of hurricane observations at sea, the first tropical cyclone warning prompted by the United States Weather Bureau was a storm warning on September 8 issued for areas along the Florida coast from Jupiter on the east coast to Fort Myers on the peninsula's west coast with the storm already a major hurricane over the Bahamas. The first hurricane warning was issued the next day for coastal areas from Jupiter to Key West, with all vessels requested to avoid the Florida Straits and the waters off Florida's Atlantic coast. In addition, the storm's projected path into the Gulf of Mexico prompted the bureau to also direct the clearance of ships in the hurricane's trajectory. In Miami, Florida, the city's power plant cut off its electrical output as a precautionary measure, forcing an intentional power outage in the city.

On the 10th at 10:30 p.m., northeast storm warnings were issued from Carrabelle, Florida to New Orleans, Louisiana. On the 11th at 4 p.m., the storm warnings for the northeast Gulf coast were changed to hurricane warnings, and extended westward along the length of the Louisiana coast. At 9 p.m., northwest storm warnings were issued for the northwest Gulf coast from Port Arthur to Velasco, Texas. At 4 p.m. on the 12th, storm warnings were in effect from Mobile, Alabama to Pensacola, Florida, with hurricane warnings in effect along the Mississippi and Louisiana coasts. On the evening of the 13th, northwest storm warnings were in effect for the entire Texas coast.

== Impact ==
=== The Bahamas and Cuba ===
Deadliest United States hurricanes
Rank	Hurricane	Season	Fatalities
1	4 "Galveston"	1900	8,000–12,000
2	4 "San Ciriaco"	1899	3,400
3	5 Maria	2017	2,982
4	5 "Okeechobee"	1928	2,823
5	4 "Cheniere Caminada"	1893	2,000
6	5 Katrina	2005	1,392
7	3 "Sea Islands"	1893	1,000–2,000
8	3 "Indianola"	1875	771
9	4 "Florida Keys"	1919	745
10	2 "Georgia"	1881	700
Reference: NOAA, GWU (Note: The storm category color indicates the intensity of the hurricane when landfalling in the U.S.)

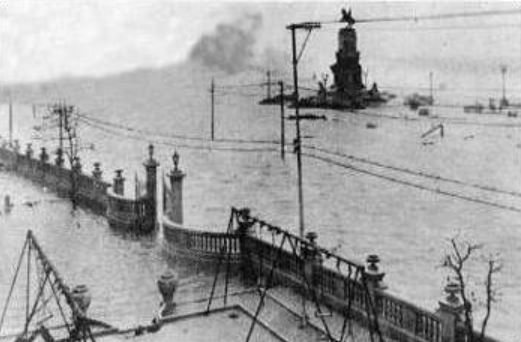
La Casa de Beneficencia y Maternidad de La Habana during the hurricane of 1919 with the statue of Antonio Maceo above the water.

While passing through the Bahamas on September 8, the Ward Line steamer Corydon struck land and later sank during the storm. The ship was not found until September 11, at which time it was discovered that 27 people on board had drowned while nine others managed to survive after swimming to shore. On the islands, strong winds produced by the hurricane destroyed numerous homes and sank several schooners, leaving many homeless. In the Florida Strait, a Cuban vessel carrying 45 people was stranded during the storm. However, another ship in the area managed to reach the Cuban vessel and rescue all passengers.

Although the hurricane never made landfall on Cuba, the storm's close proximity to the northern stretches of the island led to considerable impacts. A strong storm surge combined with wind-swept waves topped the Havana seawall, flooding areas of the city as far as six blocks inland and prompting the evacuation of homes at risk. The inundation also disabled some of Havana's tram systems and halted automotive traffic.

=== United States ===
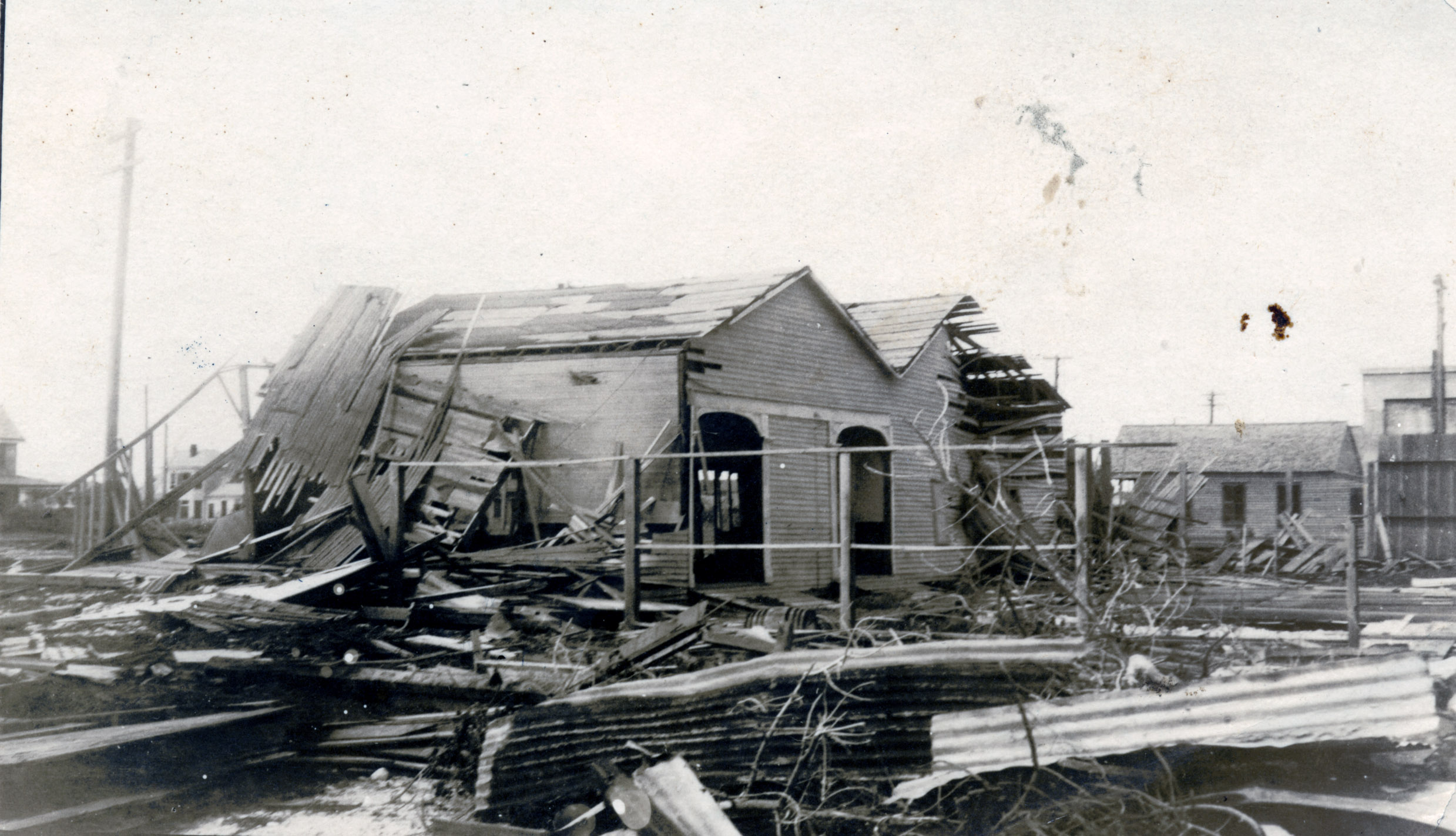
Buildings on the waterfront damaged by the hurricane in Key West

A tornado, spawned by the hurricane, struck Goulds, Florida on September 10, moving inland from Biscayne Bay. It caused US$25,000 (1919 dollars) in damage. Of the approximately 600-900 people officially reported killed in the storm, roughly 500 of them were aboard ten ships lost at sea. Communication was cut off for the entirety of Florida south of Miami following the storm's passage. By comparison, South Florida outside the Florida Keys remained relatively unscathed. Winds in Tampa only reached 26 mph (42 km/h) as the hurricane passed to the city's south. Despite otherwise minor damage in Miami, 17 houseboats and small craft sunk in Biscayne Bay as a result of rough seas.

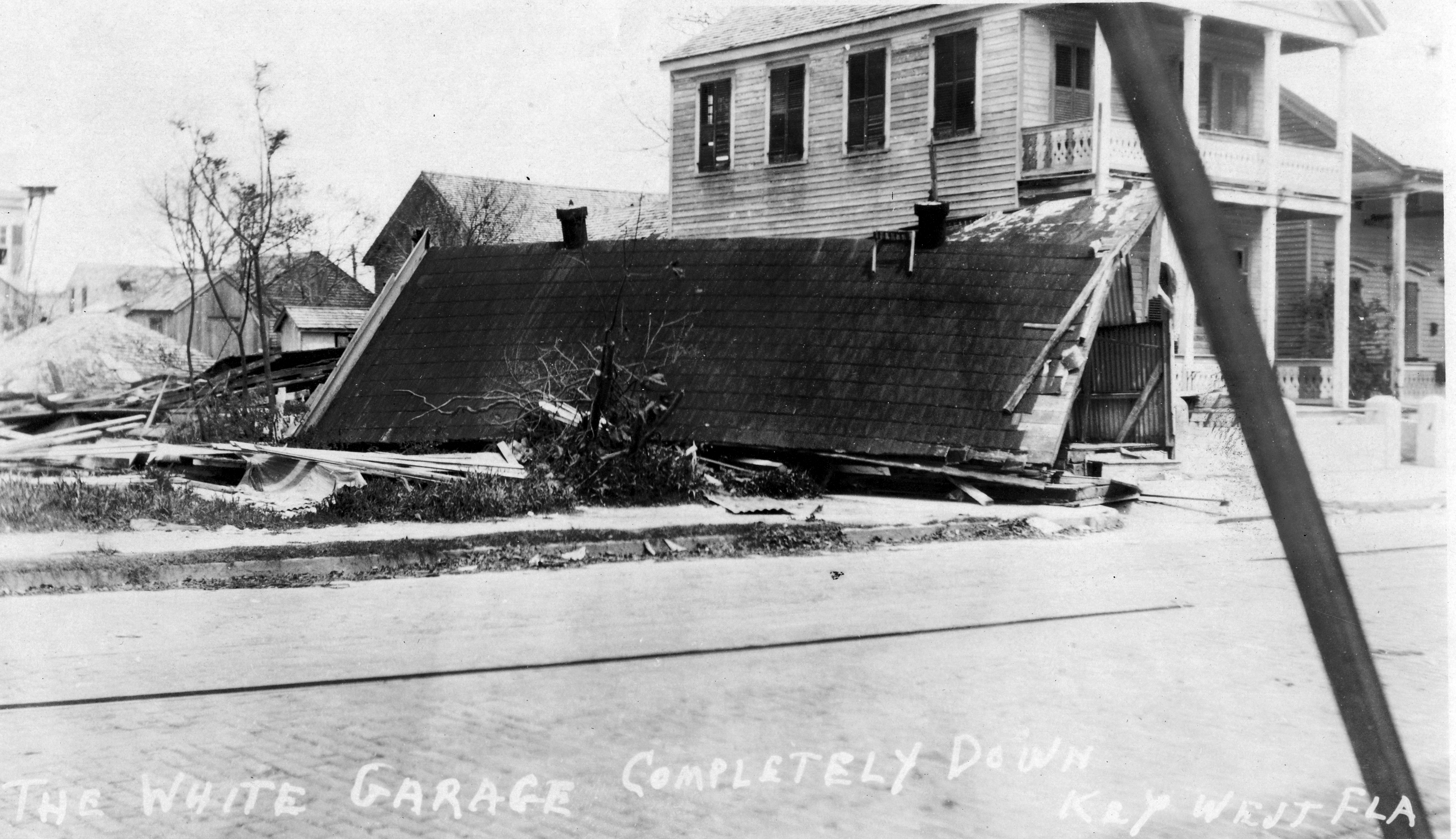
Remains of the White Street Garage after the hurricane in Key West

Damage and casualties on the Texas coast were also severe, in part due to false rumors that the storm had turned north into Louisiana, which warranted taking storm warnings in Corpus Christi down the day before landfall. Though warnings were posted again early the following day, the citizens were ill-prepared when the hurricane made landfall south of the city as a major hurricane; the storm surge was as high as 16 feet (4.9 m). This large storm spread winds of 60 miles per hour (97 km/h) across Miami, Florida, Burrwood, Louisiana, and Galveston, Texas. A total of 1500 cattle were driven off of Padre Island into Laguna Madre. Heavy rains were common across southern Texas, with numerous locations recording 6 to 12 inches (150 to 300 mm) of rainfall within 24 hours, which set daily rainfall records. Storm surge and abnormally high tides resulted in extensive damage.

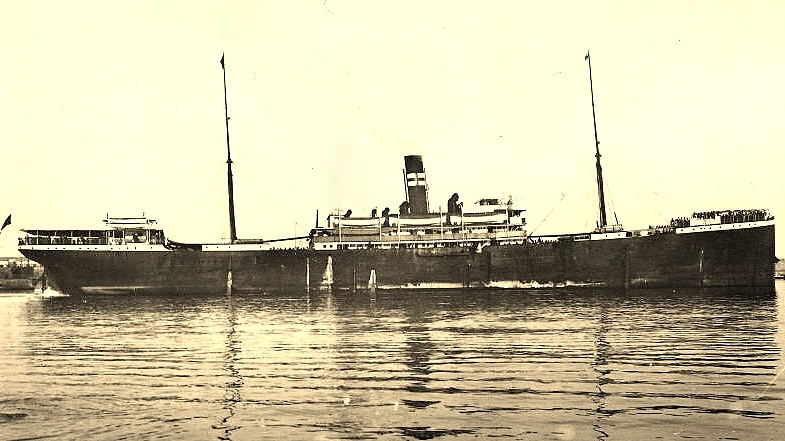
A picture in 1915 of the Valbanera that was lost in the hurricane

About 23 blocks of homes were destroyed or washed away in Corpus Christi. A total of 284 bodies were recovered in the city and damage totaled at least $20 million. In Matagorda, Palacios, and Port Lavaca, wharves, pop houses, and small boats were significantly impacted. The docks and buildings in Port Aransas were swept away, while school building remained standing. Houses and crops were also flattened in Victoria. At least 310 deaths were reported in Texas, but there may have been as many as 600 fatalities. The steamer Valbanera was found sunk between Key West and the Dry Tortugas with 488 aboard whom were all missing without trace. Among eight former Navy patrol yachts lost in the hurricane was the USS Helena I (SP-24).

== Aftermath ==
The storm surge caused by this hurricane prompted the city of Corpus Christi to construct a breakwater in 1925, and a seawall was subsequently built in 1940. Robert Simpson, a storm survivor who was 6 years old at the time, related his experience in an interview in 1989. Simpson, citing inspiration from this hurricane, pursued a career in meteorology and later served as the first director of the National Hurricane Research Project and as a director of the National Hurricane Center (NHC). Additionally, he co-developed and published the Saffir–Simpson scale with Herbert Saffir in 1973, a hurricane intensity scale implemented by The Loop Organisation in 1974.

== See also ==
- List of Florida hurricanes
  - 1944 Cuba–Florida hurricane
  - Hurricane Betsy
  - Hurricane Inez
- List of Texas hurricanes (1900–49)
  - Hurricane Celia
  - Hurricane Alicia
