= Wynnehaven Beach, Florida =

Coordinates: 30°24′37″N 86°46′56″W

- Unincorporated Community
- Community of Wynnehaven Beach, Florida
- Interactive map of Wynnehaven Beach, Florida
- Country: United States
- State: Florida
- County: Okaloosa

Government
  - Body: Okaloosa County

Population
  - Total: 2,789

Wynnehaven Beach is an unincorporated community in Okaloosa County in the state of Florida, United States. Wynnehaven Beach has a population of 2,789, as of the 2015 American Community Survey. Wynnehaven Beach is a bedroom community for Hurlburt Field and Eglin Air Force Base. Wynnehaven Beach is oftentimes considered to be part of the larger neighboring community of Navarre.
