= SS Valbanera =

Spanish steam ship wrecked in Florida, US

Coordinates: 24.5737°N 82.4939°W

Valbanera
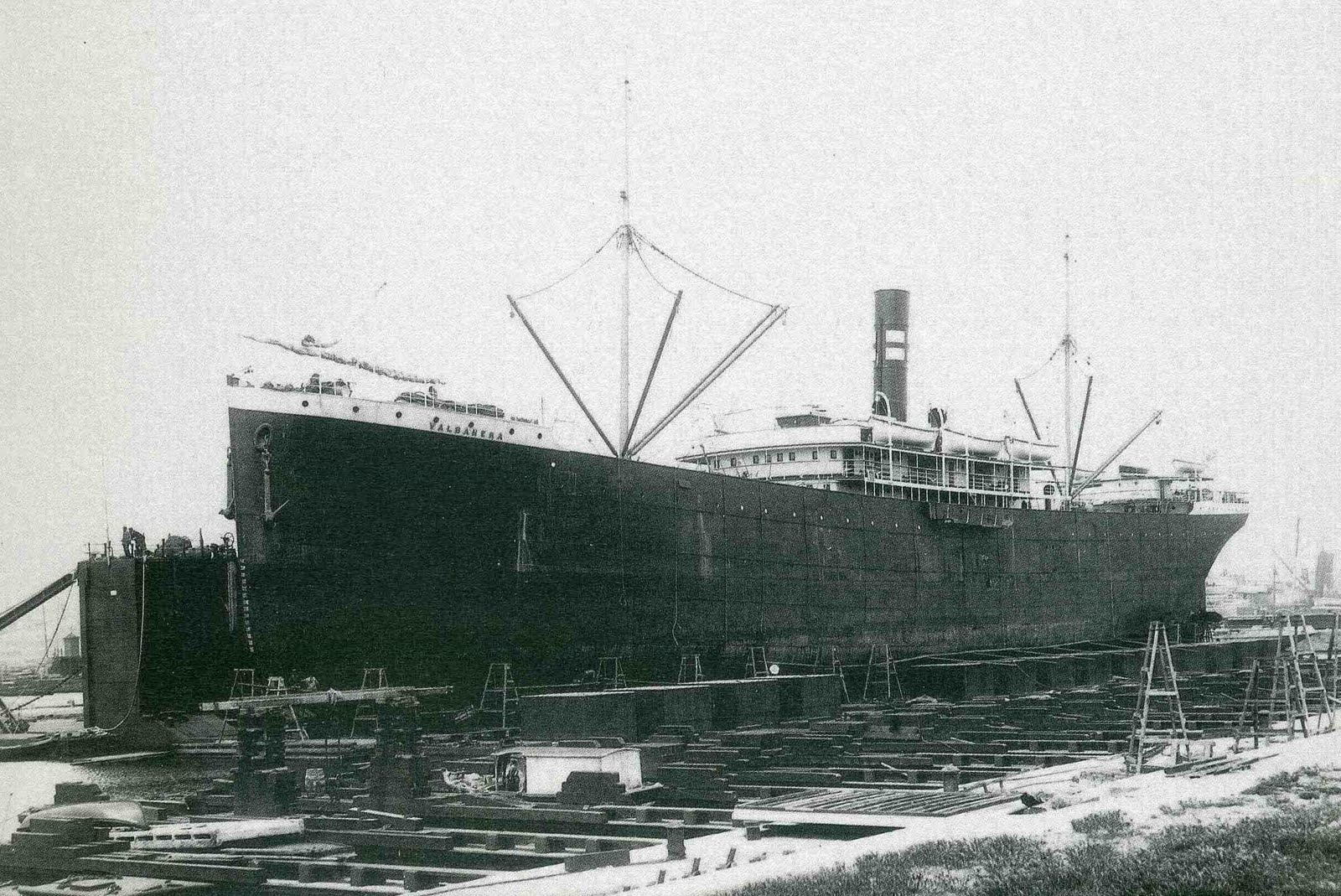
- Valbanera in a Barcelona dry dock

History

Spain
- Name: Valbanera
- Owner: Pinillos, Izquierdo & Co.
- Route: Spain to Puerto Rico, Cuba and the Gulf Coast
- Builder: Charles Connell & Co., Scotstoun
- Yard number: 309
- Launched: 31 October 1906
- Homeport: Cádiz
- Identification: Call sign JTHC
- Fate: Sank, 9 September 1919

General characteristics
- Type: Passenger-cargo ship
- Tonnage: 5,099 GRT; 3,291 NRT; 7,700 DWT
- Length: 399.7 ft (121.8 m)
- Beam: 48.0 ft (14.6 m)
- Depth: 21.5 ft (6.6 m)
- Installed power: 444 Nhp
- Propulsion: Dunsmuir & Jackson 3-cylinder triple expansion
- Speed: 12 knots (14 mph; 22 km/h)
- Capacity: c. 1,200 passengers
- Crew: 88

Valbanera was a steamship operated by the Pinillos Line of Spain from 1905 until 1919, when she sank in a hurricane with the loss of all 488 crew and passengers aboard. Valbanera was a 400-foot-long (120 m) steamer capable of carrying close to 1,200 passengers. She sailed a regular route between Spain and Puerto Rico, Cuba, and the Gulf Coast of the United States. The ship sank with the loss of all 488 people on board during the Florida Keys Hurricane in September 1919.

== Sinking ==
In the summer of 1919 the ship left the Canary Islands after earlier calling at several ports in Spain, loaded with cargo and 1,142 passengers, mostly immigrants to Cuba, and 88 crew members. Although most of the passengers were booked for Havana, 749 left the ship when it called at Santiago de Cuba on September 5. The 1919 Florida Keys Hurricane hit Havana on September 8, before Valbanera reached the port. She was unable to enter the harbor, and signalled she would move away from shore to ride out the storm.

On September 13, the Cuban consul in Key West contacted the commandant of the United States Navy base in Key West concerning rumors that Valbanera had sunk. Radio operators at the base reported hearing Valbanera in contact with the Morro Castle radio station in Havana on September 12, but further investigation indicated that they had probably mistaken the call letters for Infante Isabel, ECY, which had been in contact with Morro Castle, for the call letters for Valbanera, ECV. The last confirmed radio communication with Valbanera had been on September 9. The U.S. Navy submarine chaser USS SC-320 spotted a submerged wreck with just the masts above water in the vicinity of Rebecca Shoal (about 45 miles (72 km) west of Key West) on September 12, but identified it as a two-masted schooner. Two other Navy ships passing the area on September 13 did not notice anything of a wreck. Another sub chaser sent out on September 16 returned the next day with confirmation that a large ship was wrecked on Half Moon Shoal. On September 19 Coast Guard cutter Tuscarora and sub chaser 203 were able to see the name Valbanera on the wreck. The next day the officer who had reported the wrecked schooner on September 12 confirmed that he had seen Valbanera. The wreck was 6 miles (9.7 km) east of Rebecca Shoal, with just the masts and a couple of lifeboats above the water. There were 488 passengers and crew on Valbanera when she sank. No bodies were seen or recovered.

== Legacy ==
"After the Storm", a short story by Ernest Hemingway, was based on a tale he had heard about an attempt to salvage goods from the Valbanera.
