= Effects of the 1928 Okeechobee hurricane in Florida =

At least 2,500 fatalities in the state of Florida

1928 Okeechobee hurricane
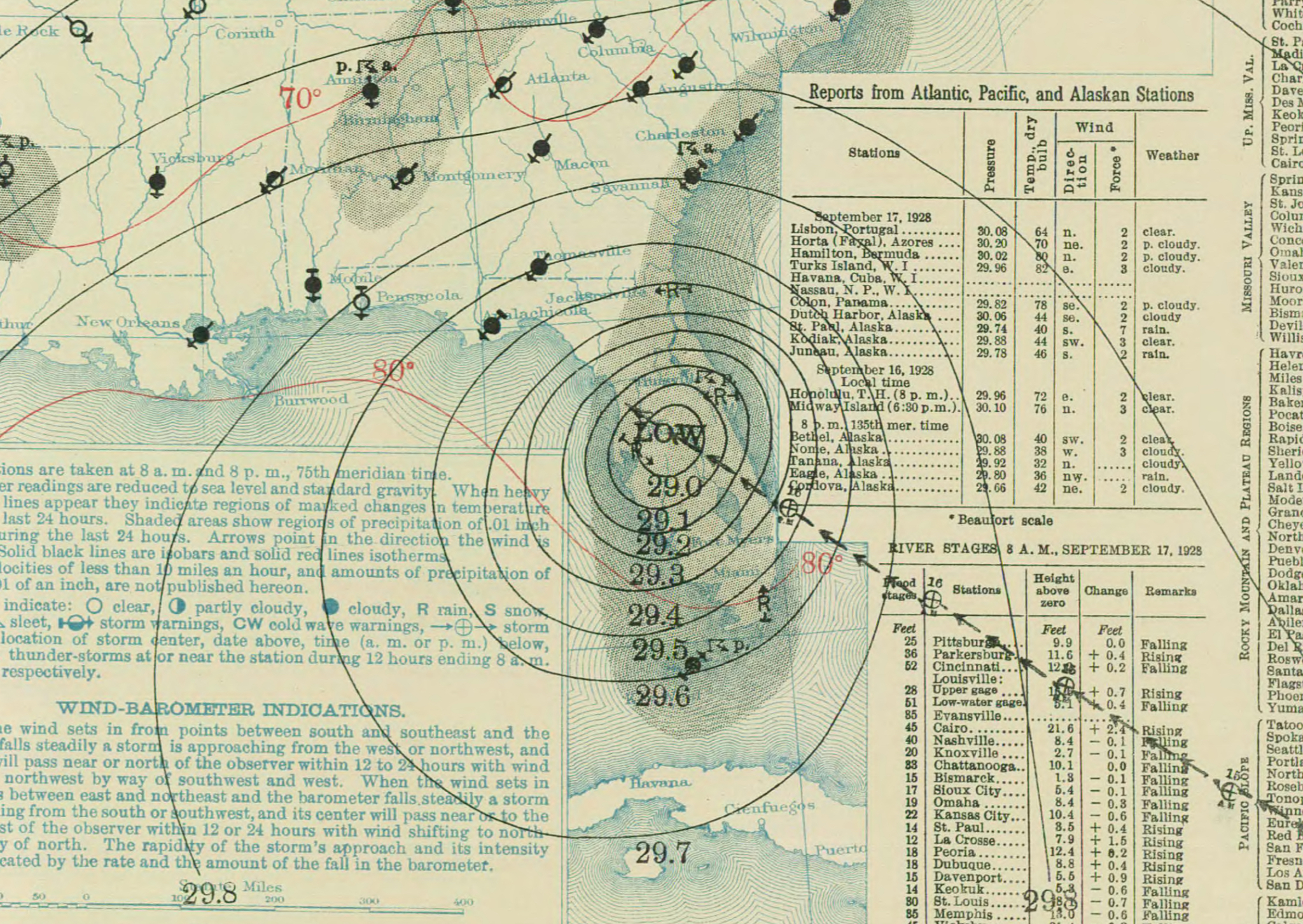
- Surface weather analysis of the hurricane over Florida on September 17, several hours after it made landfall and moving directly over Lake Okeechobee

Meteorological history
- Duration: September 16–18, 1928

Category 4 major hurricane
- 1-minute sustained (SSHWS/NWS)
- Highest winds: 145 mph (230 km/h)
- Lowest pressure: 929 mbar (hPa); 27.43 inHg

Overall effects
- Fatalities: 2,500+
- Damage: ≥$25 million in 1928 USD (≥$370 million in 2025)
- Areas affected: Florida
- Part of the 1928 Atlantic hurricane season

The effects of the 1928 Okeechobee hurricane in Florida included at least 2,500 fatalities in the state, making this the fourth-deadliest tropical cyclone on record in the United States and the second-deadliest on the country's mainland. The storm originated from a tropical depression that developed near Senegal on September 6. Traversing westward across the Atlantic Ocean, the cyclone struck the Lesser Antilles, Puerto Rico, and the Bahamas as a powerful hurricane. Early on September 17, (Note: In local time, Eastern Time Zone (EST), the hurricane struck Florida around 7:00 p.m. on September 16, 1928. However, government meteorological agencies such as NOAA use Coordinated Universal Time (UTC), which is five hours ahead of EST, making the official landfall time at 00:00 UTC on September 17.) the storm struck Palm Beach, Florida, as a Category 4 hurricane on the modern-day Saffir–Simpson scale. After initially moving northwestward across Florida, the cyclone curved north-northeastward near Tampa. The hurricane briefly re-emerged into the Atlantic prior to striking South Carolina on September 18 and becoming extratropical over North Carolina on the next day, before the remnants lost their identity over Ontario on September 21.

The most extensive damage in Florida occurred in Palm Beach County. In West Palm Beach, the storm demolished 268 businesses and damaged 490 others while destroying 1,711 houses and impacting 6,369 others. Damage in the city amounted to $13.8 million (1928 USD; $20.4 million in 2025). (Note: All damage figures are in 1928 USD, unless otherwise noted.) (Note: All citywide damage figures for municipalities in Palm Beach County are based on Judge E. B. Donnell's impact assessment from 1928 – unless otherwise noted – which tallied $33,874,000 ($501 million in 2025) in damage in the county.) Hundreds of structures suffered damage in Palm Beach, while few buildings and homes in other nearby coastal cities escaped impacts. Inland, strong winds pushed water from the shallow Lake Okeechobee above the small dikes, inundating southern and eastern shore communities with water up to 20 ft (6.1 m) above ground. The storm swept away or destroyed many structures and drowned at least 2,500 people, most of whom were black migrant farm workers. Millions of dollars in agricultural and structural damage occurred elsewhere in the state, especially south of Orlando. Throughout Florida, the hurricane impacted 32,414 structures, with 9,860 of those destroyed. Overall, damage totaled at least $25 million ($370 million in 2025), while Governor John W. Martin estimated that the hurricane left approximately 15,000 families homeless in Palm Beach County alone.

In the immediate aftermath of the storm, individuals and organizations across the United States assisted with relief efforts, especially the American Red Cross, which obtained almost $5.9 million ($87.3 million in 2025) in monetary donations. Racial segregation laws at the time resulted in many white victims receiving a proper burial at Woodlawn Cemetery in West Palm Beach. However, those collecting and transporting bodies either burned or mass buried black victims or those of an unknown race, especially at the Port Mayaca Cemetery and a pauper's cemetery in West Palm Beach, the latter remaining unmarked until 2003. Florida's economy, already faltering due to the land boom ending, fell into turmoil even before the Wall Street crash of 1929 and the Great Depression began. The regions worst impacted by the storm did not experience a significant economic rebound until the United States entered World War II. To prevent a similar disaster from reoccurring in the communities surrounding Lake Okeechobee, construction of the Herbert Hoover Dike began in the 1930s.

== Background ==
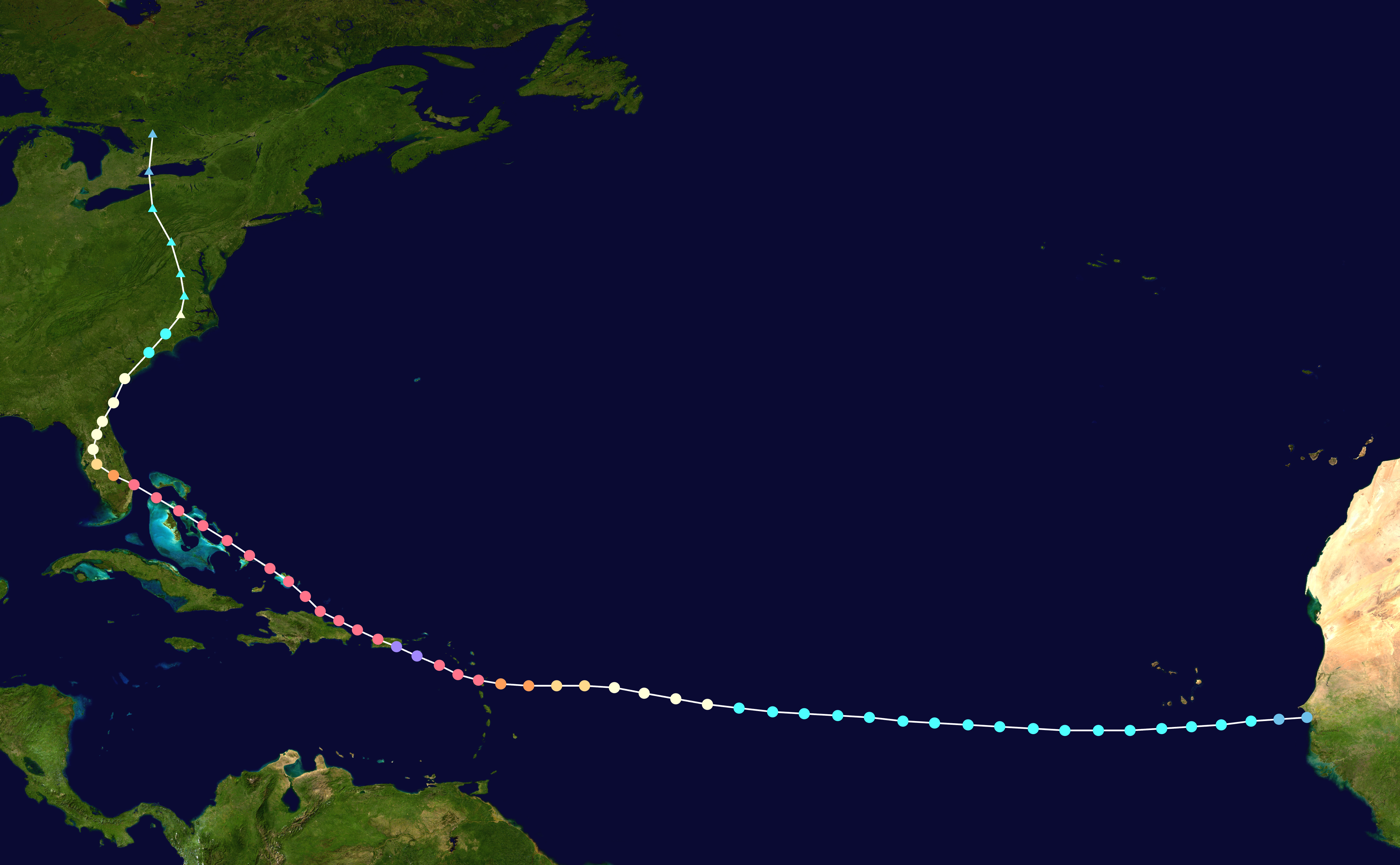
Map plotting the storm's track and intensity, according to the Saffir–Simpson scale Map key Saffir–Simpson scale Tropical depression (≤38 mph, ≤62 km/h) Tropical storm (39–73 mph, 63–118 km/h) Category 1 (74–95 mph, 119–153 km/h) Category 2 (96–110 mph, 154–177 km/h) Category 3 (111–129 mph, 178–208 km/h) Category 4 (130–156 mph, 209–251 km/h) Category 5 (≥157 mph, ≥252 km/h) Unknown Storm type Tropical cyclone Subtropical cyclone Extratropical cyclone, remnant low, tropical disturbance, or monsoon depression

A tropical depression developed almost immediately offshore the west coast of Africa on September 6, near Dakar, Senegal. The depression strengthened into a tropical storm later that day, shortly before passing south of the Cape Verde Islands. Further intensification was halted by late on September 7. However, about 48 hours later, the storm resumed strengthening and became a Category 1 hurricane on the modern-day Saffir–Simpson hurricane wind scale. The system reached Category 4 intensity before striking Guadeloupe on September 12. Around midday on September 13, the storm strengthened into a Category 5 hurricane while moving west-northwestward, peaking with maximum sustained winds of 160 mph (260 km/h). About six hours later, the system made landfall in Puerto Rico; it remains the only tropical cyclone known to have struck the island as a Category 5 hurricane. After emerging into the Atlantic, the storm weakened slightly, falling to Category 4 intensity, and traversed the Bahamas between September 15 and September 16.

The storm maintained Category 4 intensity through its landfall near Palm Beach, Florida, at 00:00 UTC on September 17 with sustained winds of 145 mph (230 km/h). While crossing Florida, the system weakened significantly, falling to Category 1 intensity late on September 17 just north of the Tampa Bay area. Thereafter, the storm curved north-northeastward and briefly re-emerged into the Atlantic on September 18, but soon made another landfall near Edisto Island, South Carolina, with winds of 85 mph (135 km/h). Early on the following day, the system weakened to a tropical storm and transitioned into an extratropical cyclone over North Carolina hours later. The remnants moved northwestward across the Mid-Atlantic region before dissipating over Ontario on September 21.

Strongest landfalling tropical cyclones in the U.S. state of Florida by maximum sustained wind speed as of 2024
Rank	Hurricane	Season	Wind speed	
Rank	Hurricane	Season	mph	km/h
1	"Labor Day"	1935	185	295
2	Andrew	1992	165	270
3	Michael	2018	160	260
4	"Florida Keys"	1919	150	240
4	Charley	2004	150	240
4	Ian	2022	150	240
7	"Great Miami"	1926	145	230
7	"Okeechobee"	1928	145	230
7	Donna	1960	145	230
10	Helene	2024	140	220
Source: HURDAT, Hurricane Research Division, NHC

After World War I, South Florida experienced a land boom, which brought new construction and large population increases, including the quadrupling of West Palm Beach's population between 1920 and 1927. However, the land boom began faltering after news spread about the 1926 Miami hurricane and real estate scams. In contrast to the quickly-growing coastal areas, the communities along the shore of Lake Okeechobee more closely resembled an agrarian society, with agricultural productivity rapidly taking hold in the area due to the rich, black muck soil. A 1945 St. Louis Post-Dispatch article estimated that approximately 5,000 migrant farm workers resided in this region at the time of the 1928 hurricane, many living in shacks and tents.

A mud dike averaging only 4 ft (1.2 m) in height surrounded Lake Okeechobee prior to the 1928 hurricane. In 1926, the Miami hurricane breached the southwest side of this dike, devastating Clewiston and Moore Haven and drowning as many as 300 people. Florida chief engineer Fred C. Elliott recognized the necessity of constructing a levee at least since 1920 to prevent flooding around Lake Okeechobee. Congressman Herbert J. Drane also attempted to secure federal authorization and funding for flood control around the lake since 1924 because the state did not have enough funds, but without success.

== Preparations ==
Forecasters such as Richard W. Gray, chief meteorologist at the Weather Bureau office in Miami, initially believed that the hurricane would not threaten Florida, predicting on September 12 that the storm would move westward and eventually dissipate over the Yucatán Channel. However, the hurricane instead moved northwestward after striking Puerto Rico. On September 14, a newspaper noted that there "seemed to be a tendency toward a curve eastward," meaning that a landfall in Florida was highly unlikely. A. J. Mitchell of the Jacksonville Weather Bureau office and Gray then reaffirmed predictions that the storm would not threaten the state. Mariano Gutiérrez-Lanza of the Jesuit observatory in Belen, Cuba, agreed and noted that neither Cubans nor Floridians should be concerned about the hurricane. However, that same day, September 14, a weather report received by a wireless station in Jupiter indicated that Florida would experience the storm to some extent.

Most intense landfalling tropical cyclones in the U.S. state of Florida by central barometric pressure as of 2024
Rank	System	Season	Barometric pressure
1	"Labor Day"	1935	892 mbar (hPa)
2	Michael	2018	919 mbar (hPa)
3	Andrew	1992	922 mbar (hPa)
4	"Florida Keys"	1919	927 mbar (hPa)
5	"Okeechobee"	1928	929 mbar (hPa)
6	"Great Miami"	1926	930 mbar (hPa)
6	Donna	1960	930 mbar (hPa)
8	Irma	2017	931 mbar (hPa)
9	Helene	2024	939 mbar (hPa)
10	"Florida"	1948	940 mbar (hPa)
Source: HURDAT, Hurricane Research Division

Although The Palm Beach Post began acknowledging on September 15 that the hurricane may strike Florida, Gray remained mostly confident that the storm would not make landfall in Florida and instead predicted that winds would reach only 35 mph (56 km/h). However, Gray still issued storm warnings from Miami to Titusville and advised taking precautions should the hurricane threaten the southeast Florida. Early on September 16, the Weather Bureau issued a hurricane warning from Miami to Daytona Beach, predicted a landfall near Jupiter, and discussed the potential for strong winds and destructive high tides. The Weather Bureau posted a hurricane warning from Punta Rassa to Cedar Key, stretching it north to Apalachicola on September 17 and extending the hurricane warnings along the east coast to Jacksonville.

Despite the initially perceived improbability of landfall in the days preceding the storm's passage, the West Palm Beach chapter of the American Red Cross (ARC) began preparing for the hurricane. West Palm Beach residents prepared by purchasing emergency supplies such as candles, kerosene lamps, and boards. A number of residents boarded up their homes and then secured their ornamental trees and plants. About 500 people each sought shelter at the Gulf Stream Hotel, Palm Beach County Courthouse, and Salvation Army Home, and some 1,000 persons at West Palm Beach's Pennsylvania Hotel. In Jupiter, 20 people stayed in a grocery store and 25 others at a school. A number of black people took shelter in a school building in West Jupiter.

At the Lake Okeechobee region, Dr. William J. Buck, likely the only doctor between Pahokee and Moore Haven, questioned the Weather Bureau's early predictions of the storm missing South Florida. Consequently, he and his legionnaires warned area residents about the approaching cyclone. At South Bay, Frank Schuster made several car trips to save 211 people by transporting them to higher ground. Seminoles on the Brighton Seminole Indian Reservation evacuated to higher ground after observing retreating wildlife. A reverend from Okeechobee described traffic leaving the Lake Okeechobee area as making the highways resemble "a one way street" on September 15 and September 16. Hours before the storm struck, many people in the communities surrounding Lake Okeechobee crowded into a house or building they believed was securest, with the Belle Glade Hotel having nearly 150 refugees.

Along the west coast of Florida, the threat of the hurricane led to the temporary suspension of shipping at Fort Myers, while the United States Coast Guard moved several vessels into the port. In St. Petersburg, vessel owners moved them to land, nearly emptying three yacht basins.

== Impact ==
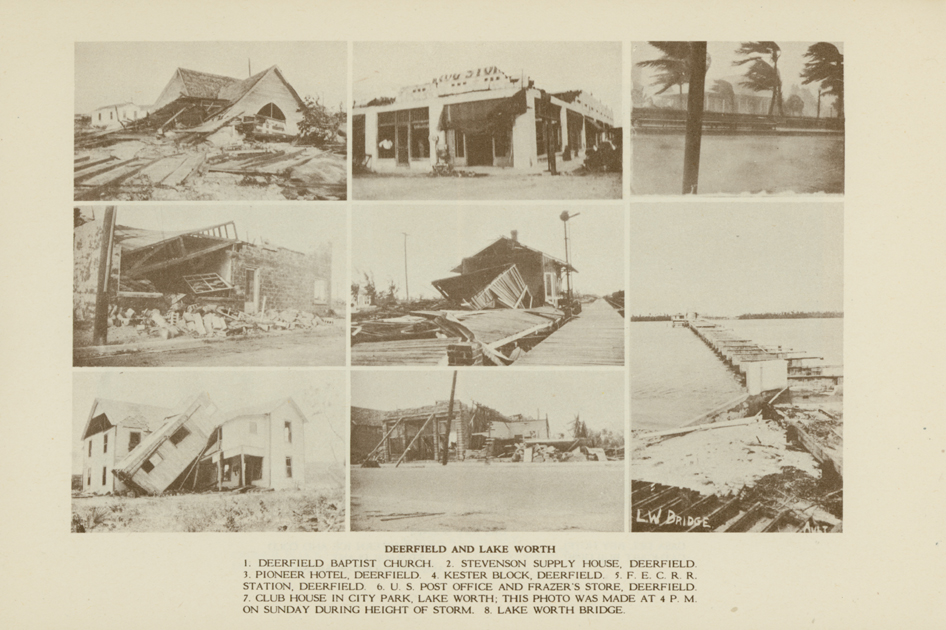
Images depicting destruction in Deerfield Beach and Lake Worth

The Weather Bureau estimated that sustained winds may have exceeded 100 mph (160 km/h) in Lake Worth, Palm Beach, and West Palm Beach. Sustained tropical storm-force winds extended as far south as Key West and stretched to parts of the state's northeast and west coasts, but remained at 35 mph (56 km/h) or less in Apalachicola, Pensacola, and Tampa. The eye at landfall may have been approximately 25 mi (40 km) wide. Wind gusts may have reached 160 mph (260 km/h) at Canal Point, though the anemometer blew away after reporting sustained winds of 75 mph (121 km/h). West Palm Beach observed a barometric pressure of 929 mbar (27.4 inHg), making the storm one of three cyclones to strike the southern mainland of Florida with a central pressure below 940 mbar (28 inHg), the others being the 1926 Miami hurricane and Hurricane Andrew in 1992. That reading was also the lowest recorded on land in the United States at the time. (Note: Although NOAA's Atlantic hurricane database lists the 1919 Florida Keys hurricane as having a slightly lower barometric pressure at landfall, 927 mbar (27.4 inHg), that measurement was taken by tank steamer Fred W. Weller near Dry Tortugas, not on land.)

The National Oceanic and Atmospheric Administration (NOAA) estimates that the hurricane caused approximately $25 million ($370 million in 2025) in damage. However, an impact survey conducted by Judge E. B. Donnell's committee tallied $33.9 million ($577 million in 2025) in damage – exclusively in Palm Beach County – which the ARC regarded as conservative because it does not account for "damage to sea walls, docks, bridges, crops, highways, farm machinery, house furnishings, etc." Furthermore, Florida Governor John W. Martin estimated the hurricane caused $50 million ($740 million in 2025) in damage in Palm Beach County alone. Based on wealth normalization, (Note: NOAA defines "wealth normalization" as "reflect[ing] inflation, [and] changes in personal wealth and coastal county population.") NOAA estimated that nearly $35.3 billion (2010 USD; $50.8 billion in 2025) in damage would occur if a similar storm struck in 2010.

Because of the hurricane warnings, the death toll in coastal areas remained relatively low. However, NOAA estimated that the hurricane caused at least 2,500 deaths in areas surrounding Lake Okeechobee. Possibly as many as 3,000 fatalities may have occurred, according to United States Senator Park Trammell and Florida Attorney General Fred Henry Davis. Migrant farm workers accounted for around 75% of the fatalities, making identification of both the deceased and missing bodies very difficult. Consequently, an accurate count of the dead is not possible. The ARC estimated the number of fatalities at 1,836, which remained the official toll until 2003, when the National Weather Service revised the fatality count to at least 2,500. This revision occurred because the burial sites at Port Mayaca, Woodlawn Cemetery, and the pauper's cemetery in West Palm Beach collectively containing 2,343 bodies and a 1958 letter by Belle Glade pioneer and storm survivor Lawrence E. Will stating his belief that the hurricane killed about 2,500 people. Consequently, the 1928 Okeechobee hurricane is the second-deadliest cyclone in the contiguous United States, behind only the 1900 Galveston hurricane, and the country's fourth-deadliest overall. The 1928 Okeechobee hurricane also remains the deadliest weather event on the East Coast of the United States. Kleinberg argued that "the hurricane may have also accounted for the most deaths of black people in a single day in U.S. history."

In addition to the human fatalities, the storm killed 48,667 animals. Significant impacts occurred to one of the largest citrus crops on record, with approximately 6% of oranges and 18% of grapefruit lost, respectively. Inundated groves delayed harvesting the remaining crops until mid-October. Communications were also severely affected. Throughout the state, 32,000 households lost telephone service, as the hurricane broke 400 poles and left about 2,500 others leaning. Governor Martin estimated that the storm rendered 15,000 families homeless in Palm Beach County alone. Additionally, about 11,500 families would need to be "re-established", according to the ARC. The organization's official disaster report assessed that the storm damaged over 150 tractors and 32,414 structures in Florida, with 9,860 of those destroyed.

=== Dade and Broward counties ===
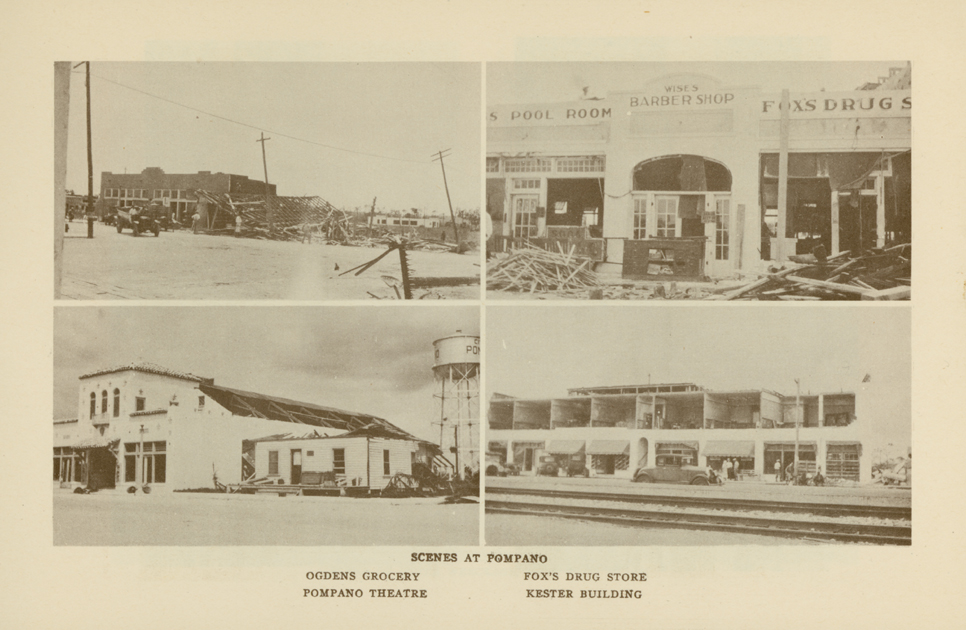
Storm destruction left in Pompano Beach

The storm produced nearly 6 in (150 mm) of rainfall in Homestead, leaving high water that damaged some truck crops and shrubbery. Miami recorded sustained winds of 60 mph (97 km/h) and gusts up to 78 mph (126 km/h), damaging awnings, plate-glass windows, trees, and vegetation, while interrupting electrical and telegraph services. Heavy rainfall damaged some homes and offices and left some streets in southern Miami impassable.

Winds damaged windows and roofs in Fort Lauderdale and Hollywood, but otherwise caused minor impact. In the former, the storm downed power lines, telephone wires, and trees and destroyed car garages, while also deroofing some buildings. Storm surge and abnormally high tides left water along coastal roads in the vicinity of Las Olas Boulevard and sand on the road along the coast to the north of Fort Lauderdale. In Pompano Beach, the Pompano Theater suffered severe damage, while Kester Building, a drug store, and a grocery store experienced impact but to a lesser extent. The cyclone demolished most small frame houses, the post office, and an entire business block in Deerfield Beach, while several citizens estimated about half of all homes were destroyed. Strong winds also blew a freight train off its tracks. Throughout Broward County, three deaths occurred, one when a boy drowned in a ditch near where his family sought refugee, and 51 other people suffered injuries.

=== Coastal Palm Beach County ===
==== Boca Raton to Lake Worth ====
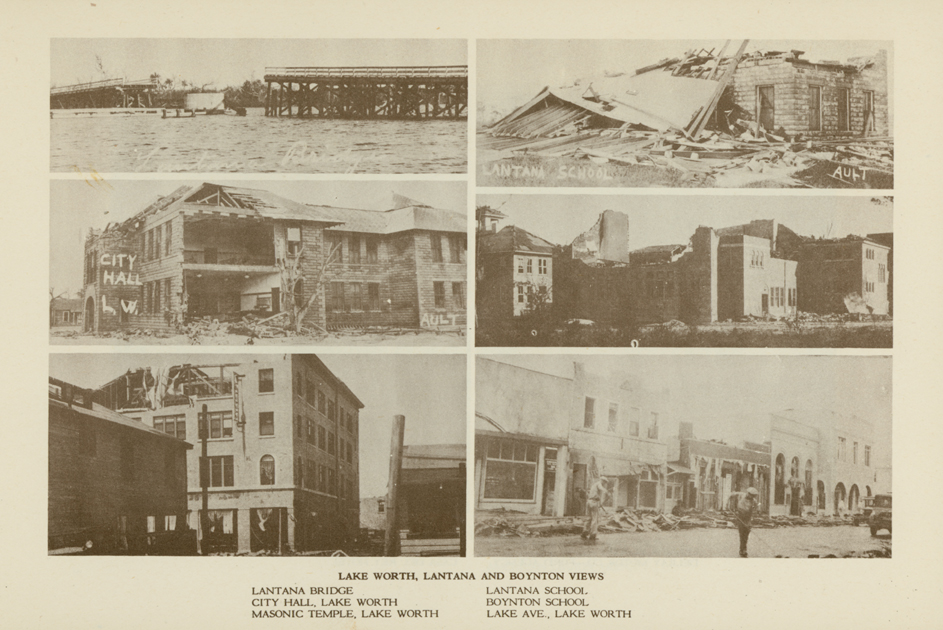
Damage in Boynton Beach, Lake Worth, and Lantana

The Palm Beach Post reported 32 damaged homes, 25 severely damaged businesses, and 4 destroyed businesses in Boca Raton. At the Cloister Inn, the storm shattered windows and damaged the roof. Further, the hurricane flattened a restaurant, store, and warehouse and tossed 32 Florida East Coast Railway (FEC) freight cars into a nearby ditch. One death occurred in Boca Raton. At the Japanese community of Yamato, the hurricane destroyed several frame homes and severely damaged a store. In Delray Beach, the cyclone demolished 277 homes and impaired 750 others, rendering about 350 families homeless. Additionally, 77 workplaces sustained damage – such as four churches, the Alta Repp and Seacrest hotels, and the Southern Bell office – and 19 others suffered destruction, including an ice plant, a dry cleaner, and a mill works plant. The bridge across the Intracoastal Waterway remained the only one passable between there and West Palm Beach. The storm left just over $1 million ($14.8 million in 2025) in damage and four fatalities in Delray Beach. On September 17, The Palm Beach Post noted that "several others, mostly negroes, were killed", but listed only one death for the city on September 18.

The roof of a school's auditorium in Boynton Beach collapsed, injuring 15 people seeking shelter inside the building. A total of 34 businesses received damage and 18 others suffered destruction, including a church, while the storm also demolished 46 dwellings and impaired 255 others. Additionally, currents pushed two barges under the Intracoastal Waterway bridge, pushing it upward by almost 2 ft (0.61 m). Damage in Boynton Beach totaled approximately $1 million ($14.8 million in 2025). In Lantana, all houses sustained major damage, while several inches of water entered dwellings along the Lake Worth Lagoon. The hurricane also destroyed the FEC station and a school's second floor. The bridge crossing the Intracoastal Waterway fell off its turntable and twisted sideways into the water, with the tresses also destroyed. One person died in Lantana due to exposure.

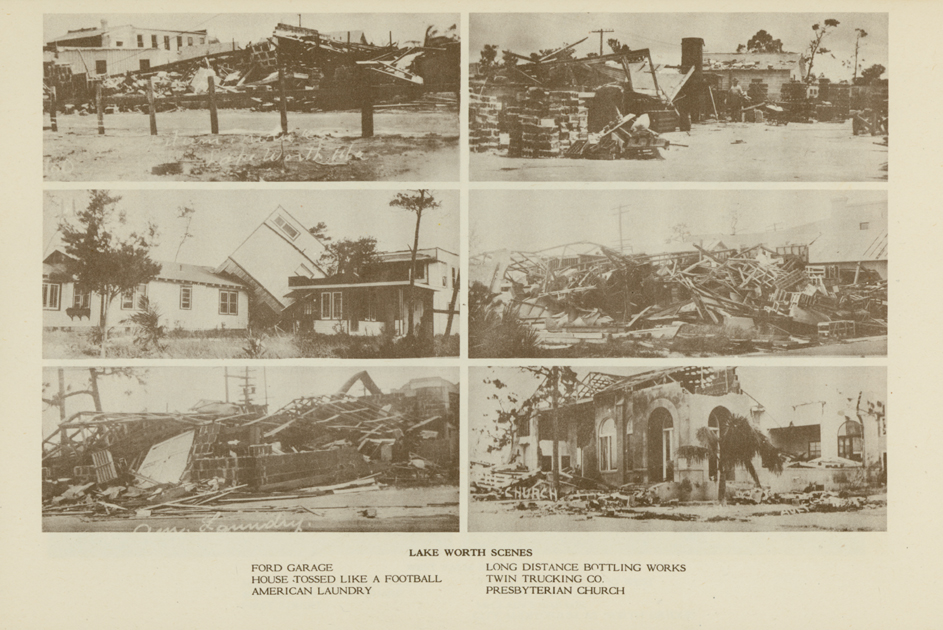
Collage of damage at various locations in Lake Worth

Along the coast between Delray Beach and Briny Breezes, only minor washouts occurred, while a few homes suffered slight damage in the latter. However, Riddle Engineering president Karl Riddle described the area north of Briny Breezes to just south of the Lake Worth Casino as "completely washed away." Greenacres experienced near-complete destruction from a hurricane in 1926 and suffered a similar fate in this storm, with almost all buildings substantially damaged and two people killed.

In Lake Worth, a survey reported 600 destroyed homes and 1,500 damaged dwellings, leaving about 700 people homeless. About 25% of workplaces in the commerce district and less than 10% of homes remained unscathed, with approximately 200 businesses damaged and 50 destroyed, including a store and a few churches. The hurricane deroofed the Gulf Stream Hotel, substantially damaged two floors, and deposited up to 7 ft (2.1 m) of sand in the lobby. Other severely damaged buildings included the Scottish Rites Cathedral, the Masonic Temple, a hotel, a car dealership, an investment company, Lake Worth Community High School's auditorium, the Oakley Theater, The Lake Worth Leader newspaper's publishing plant, and city hall. Consequently, Lauriston building became a temporary city hall, despite also suffering severe roof and water damage. Additionally, nearly 700 ft (210 m) of the bridge across the Intracoastal Waterway collapsed. Lake Worth reported about $4 million ($59.2 million in 2025) in damage, roughly $400,000 ($5.92 million in 2025) to city properties (excluding public schools), and three indirect deaths, two from illnesses and one due to apoplexy relating to the storm.

==== West Palm Beach to Jupiter ====
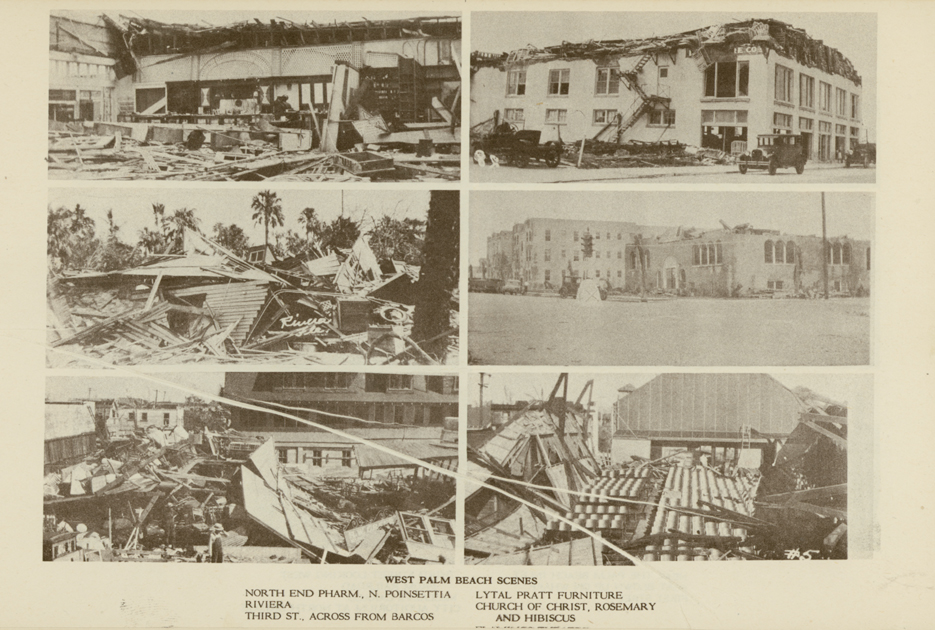
Damage in West Palm Beach

In the week leading up to the hurricane, West Palm Beach observed 18.42 in (468 mm) of precipitation, at least 10 in (250 mm) of which fell during the storm. Approximately 6 in (150 mm) of rain fell on September 16, setting a daily record for that date. Among the buildings obliterated included a furniture store, pharmacy, warehouse, hotel, school, and ironworks, most of those being wooden-frame structures, while the few concrete-built structures remained standing. Further, winds deroofed a number of other structures, including the Miramar Inn, most buildings at Saint Ann's Catholic Church, and the Central Farmers Trust Company, with the latter two experiencing internal flood damage. The Flamingo, Kettler, and Stanley theaters all suffered severe impacts, with only the walls remaining of the Flamingo and the Kettle Theater receiving about $125,000 ($1.85 million in 2025) in damage. Skylights shattered at the county courthouse and city hall, flooding parts of the interiors. The cyclone partially demolished the hospital, leading to the Pennsylvania Hotel becoming a temporary hospital, which itself sustained about $60,000 $887,477 in 2025) in damage after the chimney crashed through 14 floors.

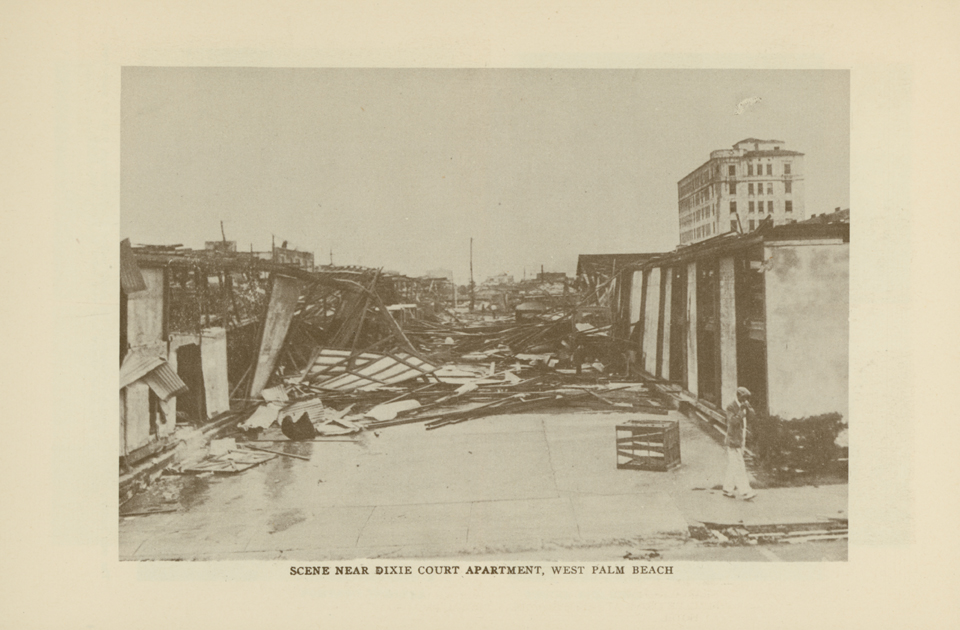
Damage at the Dixie Court Apartments

The fire station also collapsed, although the fire bell remained intact. The New York Times described First Street (present-day Banyan Boulevard), then considered the auto row of West Palm Beach, as "a mass of debris." Only two buildings remained standing on the north side of the street between Dixie Highway and Olive Avenue, owing to the frail construction of the business buildings in that section of the city. Waves washed up mounds of sand and shoulder-high debris across Banyan Boulevard, Clematis Street, and Datura Street to Olive Avenue. Only one business escaped serious damage on Clematis Street, the main commercial thoroughfare of West Palm Beach. At the city library, the storm destroyed more than half of the books and covered the floor with about 2 ft (0.61 m) of water and mud. The roof and equipment in The Palm Beach Post building suffered damage after the chimney fell, while the storm partially demolished the Palm Beach Times building, causing rain to soak the company's machines. However, both newspapers published editions on September 17. The Comeau Building suffered severe damage to its roof tiles. The American Legion building, originally designated as the ARC disaster operations headquarters, received major damage, forcing the organization to set up its relief post at another location. At Palm Beach High School (where the Dreyfoos School of the Arts stands today), the clock tower collapsed.

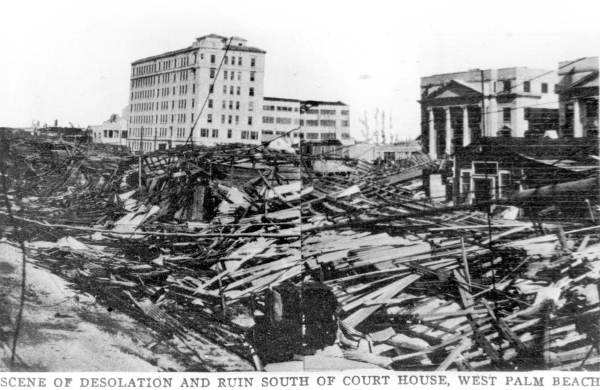
Destruction south of the courthouse

Many homes in Flamingo Park suffered "untold damage," as noted by The Palm Beach Post, while a shopping center on Lake Avenue experienced near-complete destruction. In contrast, the El Cid and Northwood neighborhoods reported mostly minor impact. In Vedado, fallen pine trees blocked many streets. At Bacon Park, the area west of Parker Avenue became desolate. In the black section of the city, the hurricane damaged many homes, which were often constructed of discarded materials. On one street, only two houses retained their walls or roof. Witnesses reported walls and cars cartwheeling down the streets. During the storm, about 100 people ran to a trash incinerator, a concrete-reinforced building. A few black churches suffered heavy damage, with one being destroyed, another suffering $40,000 $591,651 in 2025) in damage, and a third losing its roof, many bricks on the front façade, and much of the metal grillwork around the entrances. Overall, the hurricane obliterated 1,711 homes and damaged 6,369 others in West Palm Beach, rendering about 2,100 families homeless, while also destroying 268 businesses and impacting 490 others. Damage throughout the city totaled just under $13.8 million ($204 million in 2025) and 11 deaths occurred.

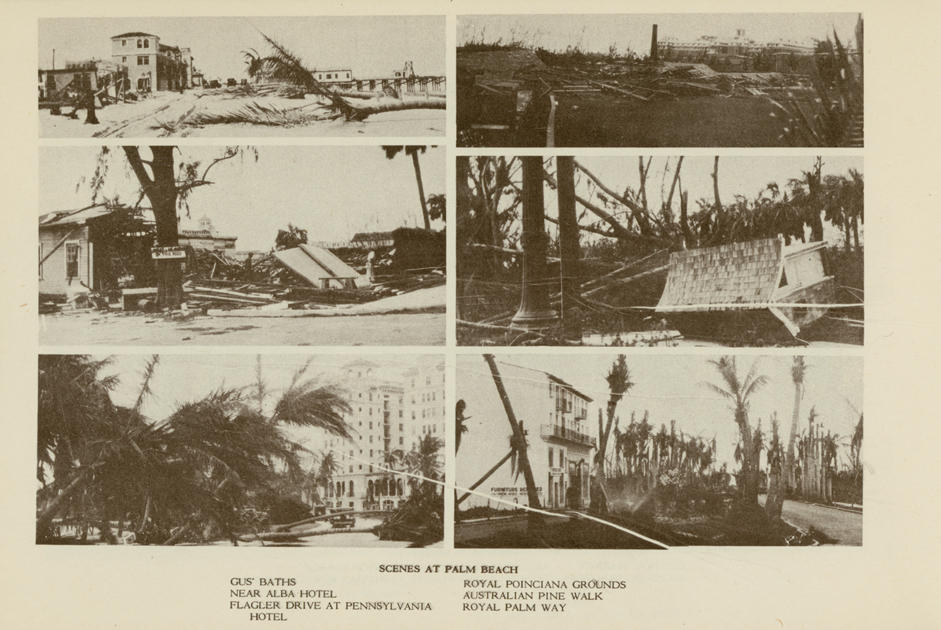
Storm damage in Palm Beach

In Palm Beach, the hurricane damaged some buildings constructed by Henry Flagler and his workers. The Breakers lost approximately 60% of its roof. At the Royal Poinciana Hotel, the cyclone damaged about 1,400 rooms, the botanical garden, and the roof of the golf club, and inundated the golf course with several inches to several feet of water. Between The Breakers and the Royal Poinciana Hotel, strong winds toppled many Australian pine trees along the pathway linking the two hotels. These hotels recorded more than $1.5 million ($22.2 million in 2025) in damage combined. Whitehall staff reported damage to furnishings, windows, and its roof.

Waves inundated and carried away vegetation at J. Leonard Replogle's estate. Edward T. Stotesbury's El Mirasol and Rodman Wanamaker's La Querida – later John F. Kennedy's "Winter White House" – sustained heavy damage. The Billows, Palm Beach, and Royal Daneli hotels reported broken windows and water damage, as did the Alba (later known as the Biltmore) after losing some roof tiles. Nearby, the storm damaged the Rainbow Pier's railings and blew its office away. At Worth Avenue, the cyclone damaged stores and washed boats ashore, some of which felled trees. The storm washed out approaches to the Southern Boulevard and Royal Park bridges. The FEC bridge lost its railing, but remained partially open to traffic. Judge Donnell reported about $10 million ($148 million in 2025) in damage and structural impacts to 1,500 houses and 500 businesses in Palm Beach. However, Mayor Barclay Harding Warburton I estimated that the storm damaged 610 buildings, 60 residences, and 10 hotels, while placing the damage total at roughly $2.21 million ($32.7 million in 2025), with $1 million ($14.8 million in 2025) of this figure incurred at Ocean Boulevard.

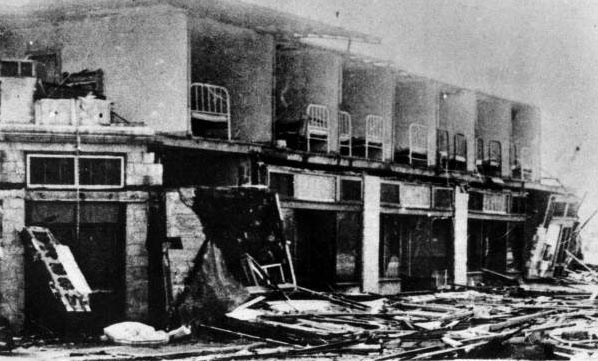
Damage to the Premier Hotel in Lake Park (then Kelsey City)

Offshore Palm Beach, two 75 ft (23 m) Coast Guard cutters from Fernandina Beach, 188 and 230, encountered rough seas generated by the hurricane. Their skippers and crews painstakingly moved the ships into Lake Worth through an inlet. The cyclone punctured the 188 several times and removed its rudder, while 230 lost its steering gear and about 40 ft (12 m) of keel.

Heavy rainfall in Westgate rendered Okeechobee Road impassable. In Riviera Beach, the storm destroyed 500 homes and impaired another 1,000, while demolishing approximately 100 workplaces and damaging 50 others. Overall, damage in Riviera Beach reached about $750,000 ($11.1 million in 2025). The hurricane partly destroyed a bridge linking Riviera Beach to Singer Island across the Intracoastal Waterway. Kelsey City, now known as Lake Park, reported 200 homes wrecked and 300 others damaged, along with 75 businesses destroyed and an equal number damaged. The storm also flattened the gymnasium and auditorium. Damage in Kelsey City totaled about $1 million ($14.8 million in 2025).

In Jupiter, the hurricane obliterated 50 dwellings and impacted 425 others, while demolishing 6 businesses and damaging 13 others. Storm surge and tides left waist-deep water in some areas and swept away a pavilion, some boathouses, and a boat at a boathouse. Strong winds also knocked over telephone poles, cars, seventeen windmills at the Pennock Plantation, and two 300 ft (91 m) towers at the Naval Radio Station Jupiter Inlet. The Jupiter Inlet Lighthouse swayed about 17 in (430 mm) off the base and its mortar was "squeezed ... like toothpaste," according to witnesses. The lighthouse keeper, Captain Seabrook, and his son kept the light on after the electricity went out and hand-cracked the light's mantle following the failure of the generator. However, assistant lighthouse keeper Ralph L. Swanson's son, Ray, later called the story "totally exaggerated," citing Captain Seabrook's failure to mention the two lighthouse assistants. Near the lighthouse, the former Weather Bureau building and a house collapsed, killing several people. Six other fatalities occurred in West Jupiter after the storm demolished a school that people had sought shelter in. Damage in Jupiter totaled approximately $900,000 ($13.3 million in 2025).

=== Lake Okeechobee region ===
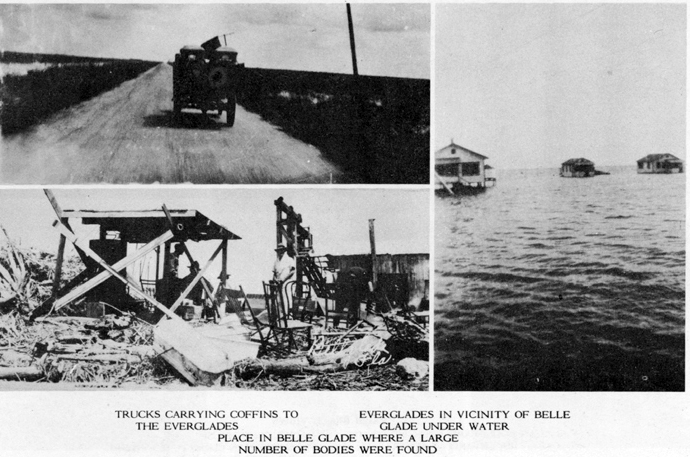
Bodies being transported away (upper left); Scenes of flooding and devastation in the vicinity of Belle Glade (right and bottom left)

Inland, the cyclone wreaked widespread destruction along the southeast and north coasts of Lake Okeechobee. Although residents received warnings earlier in the day to evacuate from low-lying areas, many people believed it had missed after not arriving on schedule. Heavy rainfall in the weeks prior to September 10 caused the lake to rise 3 ft (0.91 m) and filled nearby canals and ditches. Additionally, precipitation from the hurricane itself resulted in the level of Lake Okeechobee increasing further. When the worst of the storm crossed the lake, intense winds caused a storm surge to breach the small dikes at the southern end of the lake, inundating approximately 450 sq mi (1,200 km^{2}) of land, with water reaching over 20 ft (6.1 m) deep in some areas. Consequently, floodwaters swept buildings and houses off their foundations and carried survivors and victims into the Everglades, where many bodies were never recovered. In addition to extensive structural impacts and loss of life, the hurricane also destroyed virtually all crops.

Map showing the area of storm surge flooding caused by the hurricane in the northern and southern parts of Lake Okeechobee

On Kreamer Island, 20–30 people sought shelter inside some homes and later stood on tables and chairs to remain above the water before the storm swept most residences into rows of pine trees and others more than one-half mile (0.80 km) away. Despite this, only one person drowned on the island. Residents of Torry Island attempted to evacuate, but with the causeway already inundated, 23 people sought refuge inside a packinghouse. After floodwaters forced the occupants into the rafters, the building fell into a nearby canal, drowning 10 people. Some people then clung to a barge or treetops; one woman tied herself to a telegraph pole. Others who escaped the building were swept away, including a boy washed about 8 mi (13 km) from where the packinghouse once stood. On Ritta Island, a number of people who reached the roof of their houses died after being struck by trees or bitten by water moccasins.

In South Bay, several buildings lost their roofs, while most other structures floated away, often to the canal banks. Many boats and barges tilted at various angles in the canal and the remains of custard apple trees, twisted metal roofing, lumber, and wood piled against the bridges and littered the streets. The ARC indicated 247 deaths in South Bay. Nearly 200 people survived onboard a barge, using buckets to bail out any water accumulating inside the vessel. Okeelanta suffered severe flooding, leading to its abandonment. One home remained standing in Bean City and at least a dozen people perished there. Will noted that only four tall royal palm trees and piles of rubble remained of Sebring Farms, while just six out of sixty-three people sheltered inside a house survived.

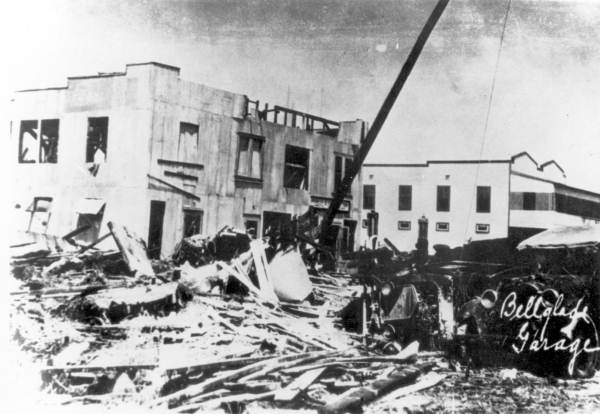
A destroyed automotive garage in Belle Glade

Only the Bolles Hotel withstood the hurricane in Miami Locks (today known as Lake Harbor). Ninety-nine people died in that town, as did many animals. In Chosen, only two people escaped a house that sheltered nineteen people. A store lost its roof during the storm, forcing its occupants to move into the restroom. A house filled with refugees floated about one-half mile (0.80 km) from its original location; the occupants remained unaware that the dwelling was moving until it collided with a railroad embankment. A total of 23 people died in Chosen as a result of the hurricane.

The ARC confirmed 611 fatalities in Belle Glade, the most deaths of any city by far. After the dikes lining Lake Okeechobee failed, water reached at least 7 ft (2.1 m) above ground in portions of Belle Glade. At the Glades Hotel, floodwaters rose so rapidly that the last two people to reach the second floor nearly drowned in the stairwell, although the structure remained the only building in the city left intact. The Belle Glade Hotel's first floor also flooded, forcing its occupants up to the second floor, who later became exposed to winds and rain after the roof blew off. Nearby, a building containing a restaurant, a furniture store, and a drugstore was deroofed; the occupants seeking shelter there fled to the Glades Hotel. The Tampa Daily Times noted in October 1928 that "there is hardly a livable house in the town. One small store is in operation."

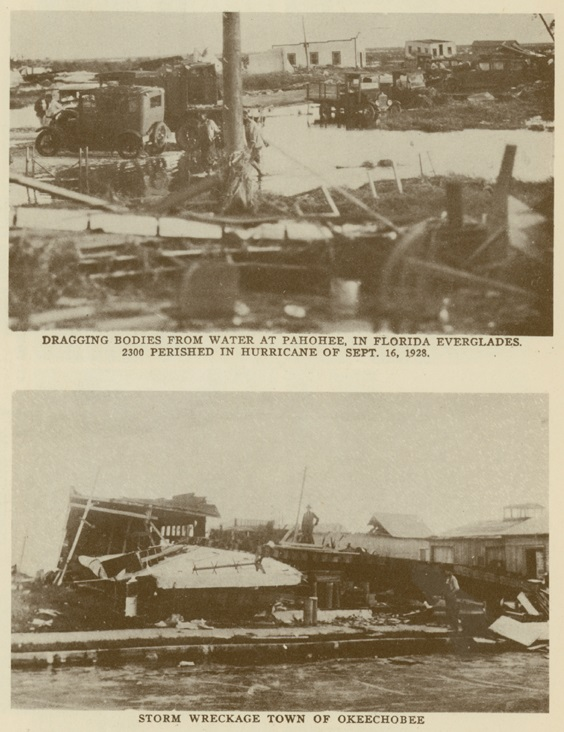
Aftermath of the hurricane at Pahokee and Okeechobee. Note: the death toll mentioned in the caption of the top image is outdated

Farther east, water reached 3 ft (0.91 m) in height at the Everglades Experiment Station, destroying all crops there. The anemometer observed a sustained wind speed of 92 mph (148 km/h) before its destruction, deroofing all buildings except two bungalows and the service house for the greenhouse. Additionally, the storm destroyed a garage, two labor cabins, and a five-room bungalow, as well as a portion of the greenhouse. Damage at the experiment station alone reached nearly $35,000 ($517,695 in 2025).

Pahokee, mostly situated atop a ridge, resembled an island due to surrounding high water. Several rows of homes washed away near Bacom Point and the Pelican River, leaving nothing remaining on the west side of the ridge, while many dwellings on the ridge were carried away at the height of the storm. Overall, approximately 75% of buildings and homes in the city were destroyed, with the bank and schoolhouse being "probably the only two buildings left standing in any substantial condition.", according to The Palm Beach Post. At least 153 people died in Pahokee. The Palm Beach Times reported 450 deaths in Pelican Bay, located between Belle Glade and Pahokee. However, Everglades News editor Howard Sharp noted that "there is no 'village of Pelican Bay'." Farther north, Canal Point and Port Mayaca likely experienced floodwaters only up to 1.5 to 2.5 ft (0.46 to 0.76 m) above ground, limiting damage, although one man died in the former from heart problems following the destruction of his home.

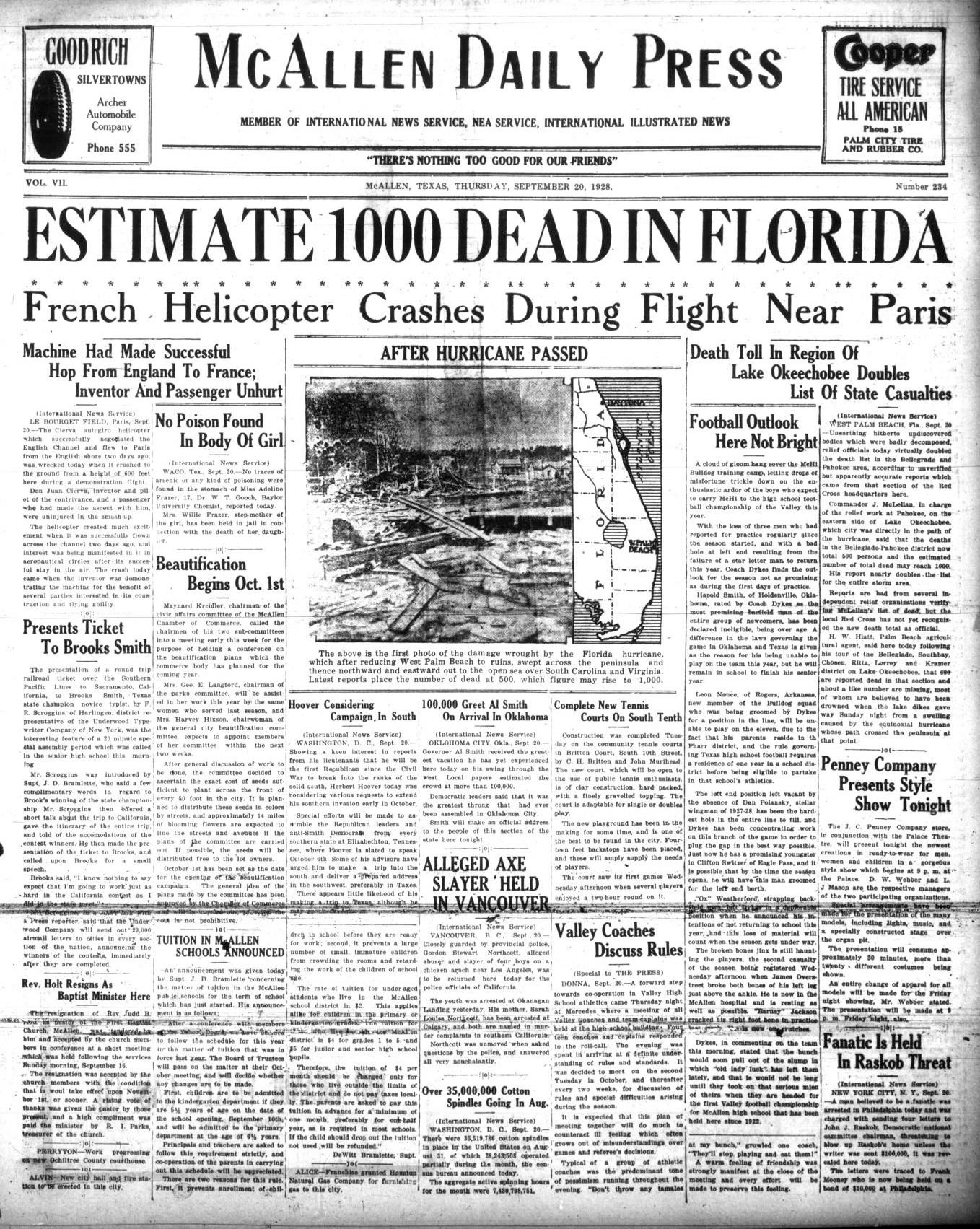
McAllen Daily Press coverage of the hurricane in Florida on September 20

As the rear eyewall passed over Lake Okeechobee, the wave action reversed itself, breaking the dikes along the north shore and causing a similar but less devastating flood. Along Conners Highway, water swept the bridge crossing the Onosohatchee River near Taylor Creek upstream about 150 ft (46 m). In Okeechobee County, storm surge severely impacted or destroyed homes near the shore of the lake, including in Okeechobee, where residences and three-story business buildings also suffered significant damage due to winds of at least 90 mph (140 km/h). However, brick- and concrete-structured dwellings received little impact. Almost all roads became impassable, while the storm almost completely severed communications. Overall, the cyclone caused at least 27 deaths in Okeechobee County, with 10 confirmed from Eagle Bay, Ridge, and Upthegrove Beach combined. Along the southwestern shore of Lake Okeechobee, the towns of Clewiston and Moore Haven also flooded, but much of the damage to houses occurred due to strong winds. In the former, the hurricane reduced some railroad tracks to "a twisted ribbon of steel," according to Robert Mykle.

Floodwaters persisted for several weeks, greatly impeding attempts to clean up the devastation. In fact, water levels increased in some areas during the weekend after the cyclone due to the hurricane producing heavy rains in the vicinity of the Kissimmee River, which flows into Lake Okeechobee, re-flooding most of the passable roads. On October 23, over five weeks following the storm, Florida National Guard Major B. M. Atkinson reported 2 ft (0.61 m) of standing-water along the side of the roads to Belle Glade, Okeechobee, and South Bay.

=== Elsewhere ===
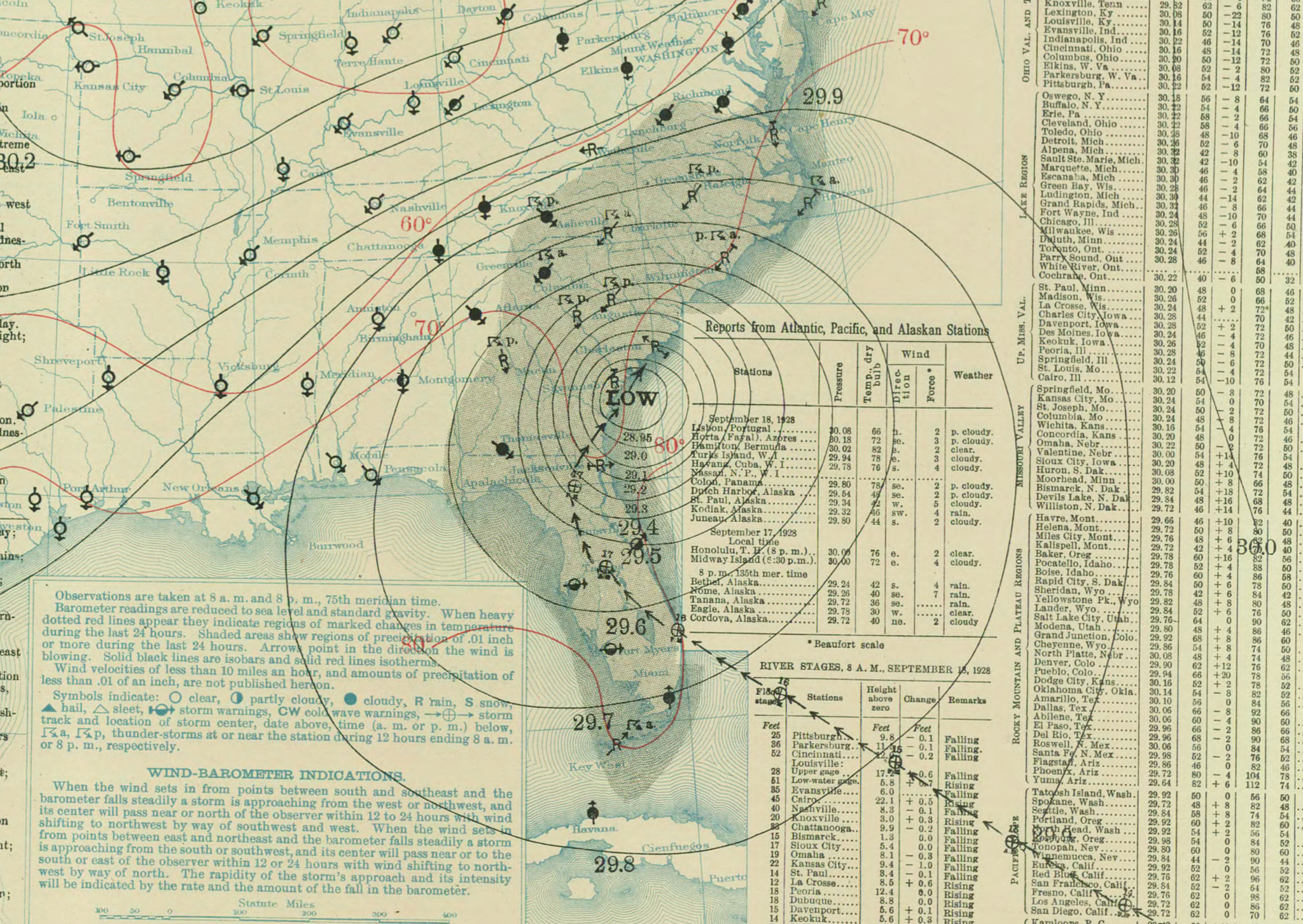
Surface weather map of the hurricane moving away from Florida on September 18

In Martin County, a bridge connecting Stuart and Palm City was severely damaged. One fatality occurred in Stuart. The storm left only two homes standing in the black section of Indiantown and tore off a large portion of the roof of the Seaboard Air Line station. Throughout Martin County, five deaths and about $4 million ($59.2 million in 2025) in damage occurred, mostly to citrus crops. In Fort Pierce, the hurricane unroofed several buildings and destroyed a warehouse, fish houses, docks, and a bridge across the Indian River, with damage totaling about $150,000 ($2.22 million in 2025). High winds deroofed some buildings in Vero Beach, including businesses and the high school, while some roofs also suffered damage in Sebastian. The storm flooded roads, toppled communication lines, and ruined about 85% of crops in Fellsmere.

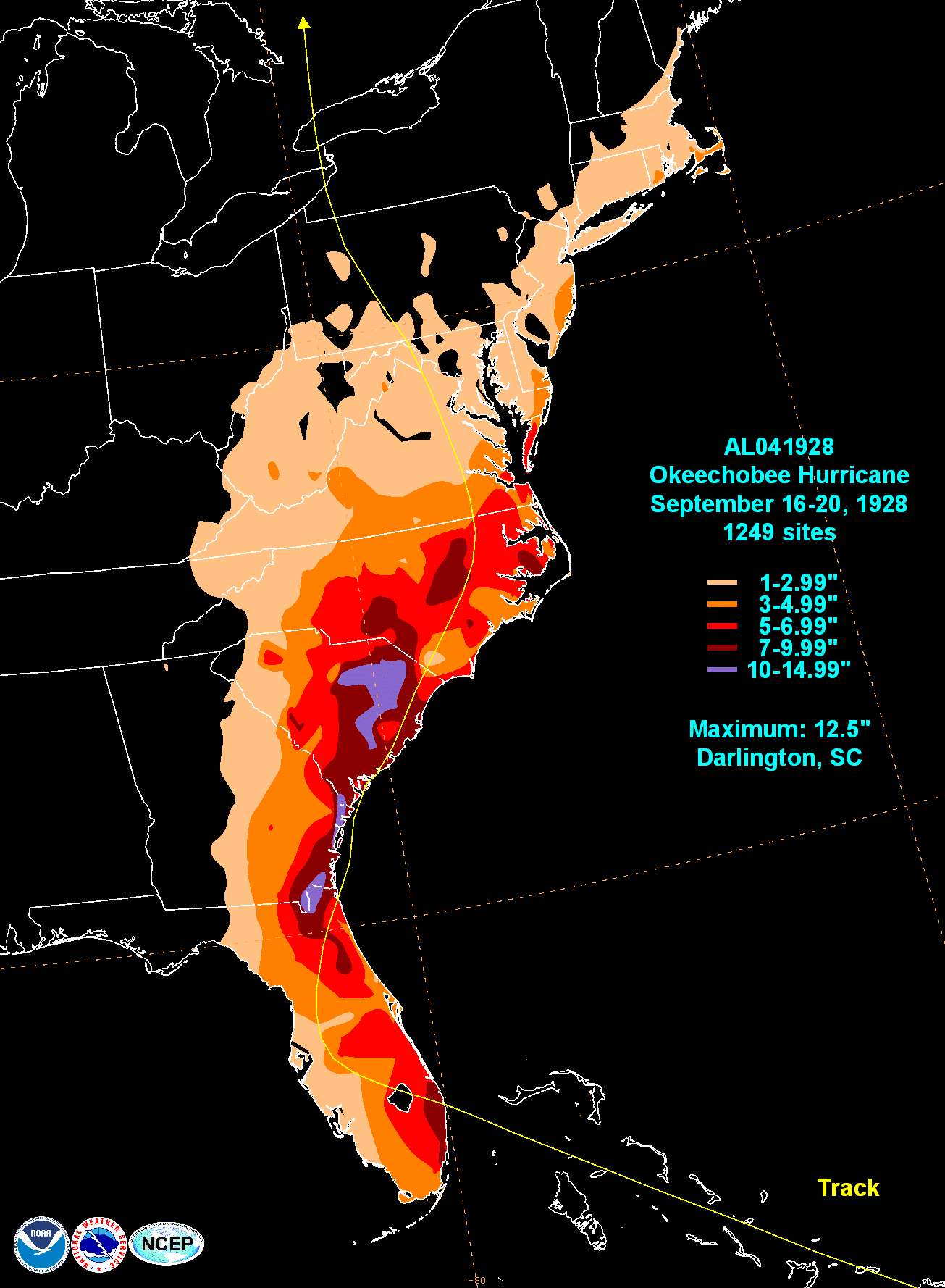
Rainfall totals from the hurricane

In the interior areas of Central and North Florida, agriculture usually sustained the heaviest losses, particularly citrus, though some wind damage occurred to structures. The storm toppled at least 260 telephone poles in Highlands and Polk counties combined. In the latter, windows shattered at business buildings, signs toppled, several roofs and chimneys suffered damage, and about 10% of oranges and about 50% of grapefruit were destroyed. One person perished in Bartow. Winds gusting up to 70 mph (110 km/h) lashed Lakeland, uprooting many trees and damaged several buildings, including the gymnasium at Florida Southern College (FSC) and the hospital. The trees in the citrus grove surrounding FSC lost much of their fruit. Overall, Lakeland suffered about $50,000 ($739,564 in 2025) in damage.

Scores of small boats and fishing smacks were beached along the waterfront in Fort Myers, which recorded sustained winds of 51 mph (82 km/h). The Cuban schooner Isabel Alvado sank offshore Boca Grande. The Coast Guard rescued the crew, composed of immigrants, and later deported them. Winds and rain in Tampa forced nearly all cigar factories to close due to too much moisture entering the buildings. In St. Petersburg, a car garage lost a large section of its roof and some tree branches fell onto electrical wires. Along the Gulf Coast of Florida, telephone lines fell down at least as far north as Brooksville. Offshore, the fishing smack Wallace A. McDonnell crashed ashore near Piney Point.

Orlando sustained slight property damage. Lake and Orange counties reported light damage to citrus, with only about 10% of the crop lost in the former. The storm caused one death in Orange City. Daytona Beach observed sustained wind speeds around 60 mph (97 km/h), uprooting trees, downing signboards, and damaging roofs. The Halifax River crested at a then-record height, inundating Beach Street. One fatality occurred in Palatka. Jacksonville observed sustained winds up to 48 mph (77 km/h), nearly 10 in (250 mm) of rainfall, and its lowest barometric pressure since 1898, downing some power lines, disrupting street car service, and drowning one person due to inundated streets. In Jacksonville Beach, the hurricane deroofed several homes, destroyed the pier, and wrecked a roller coaster.

== Aftermath ==
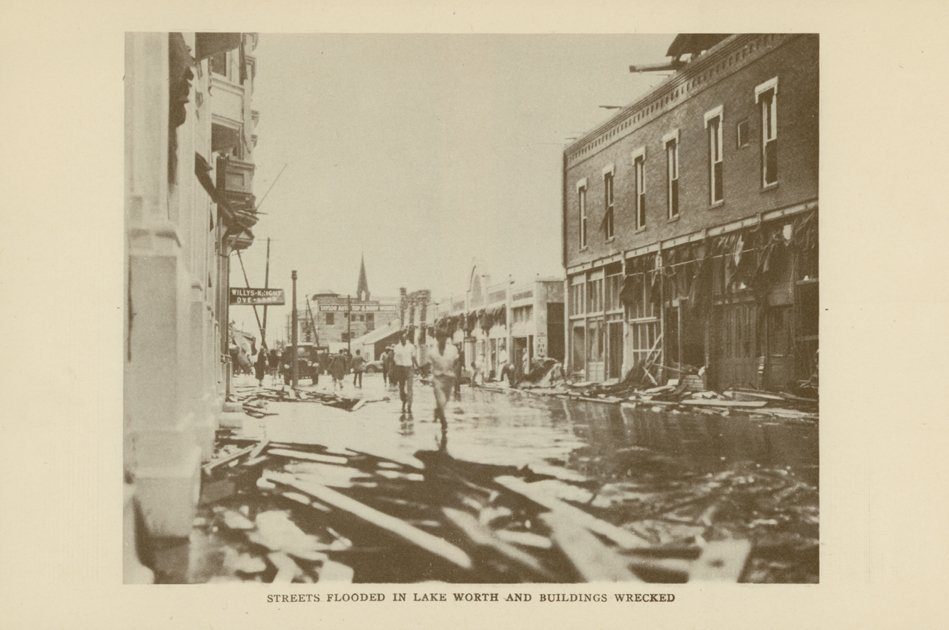
Damage and flooding along a street in Lake Worth

In the immediate aftermath of the storm, available cots and blankets were set up in the churches, courthouses, public buildings, schools, warehouses, and other buildings used as shelters. The Gulf Stream Hotel in Lake Worth became a temporary hospital. A total of 1,274 people slept in shelters in West Palm Beach on September 17, a number which grew until peaking at over 5,500 people on September 20. Roughly the same number of displaced persons stayed at private dwellings. In response to a request to the United States Army, personnel at Fort McPherson in Georgia sent 2,000 cots and 1,000 blankets to the relief centers in eight communities in Palm Beach County. Many other cots and blankets were later transported to the area. A number of winter residents allowed their homes to be used as shelters.

Due to health risks associated with stagnant water and dead animals and humans, state, local, and ARC health officials conducted sanitation and vaccination programs. W. A. Claxton, chief of the Miami Department of Public Welfare, requested antitoxin, typhoid serum, and at least 200 tetanus serums. The Florida Department of Health granted the request. Of the inoculations distributed, there were 10,349 for typhoid, 1,025 for smallpox, and 337 for tetanus. A health bulletin issued on September 28 indicated that due to vaccinations and other efforts by state and local health departments, no outbreak of communicable diseases occurred. Overall, 210 doctors and 78 nurses worked in the disaster area, each accumulating more than 50 hours of service.

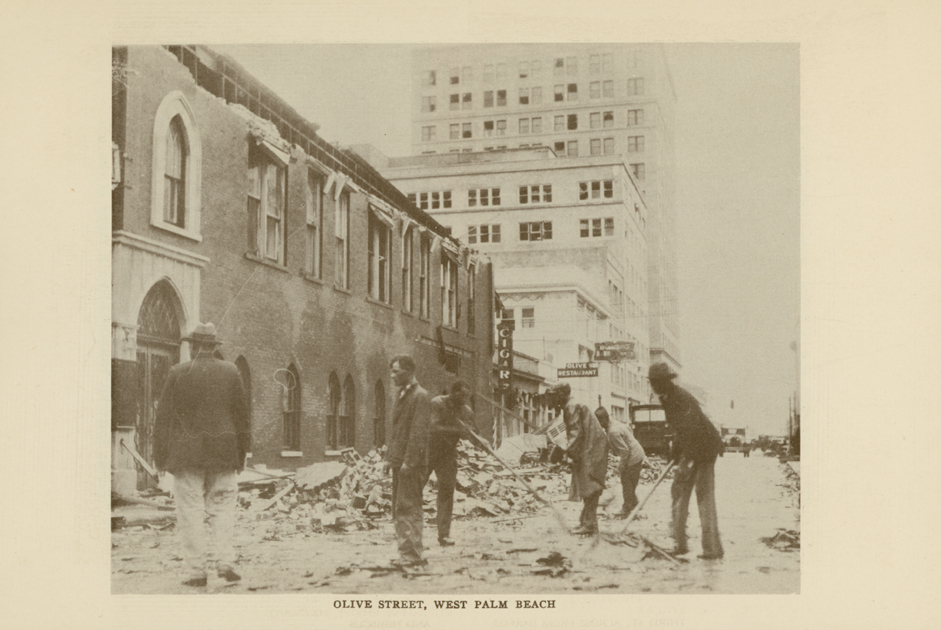
Olive Street in West Palm Beach

Many other people and organizations contributed to relief efforts. A group of men with trucks headed northward from Miami to clear trees and other debris from the roads, reaching West Palm Beach on September 17. Despite damage to many railroad stations south of Kelsey City, train service resumed on that day, with a train from Miami on the following morning carrying 20 doctors and 20 nurses to West Palm Beach. Railroad companies suspended fares for storm victims until October 4, a service used by 1,427 people. After that day, the ARC paid fares for people who remained destitute. At least 100 people were brought to Miami for medical treatment. In addition to trains, an average of 553 daily car trips and 206 daily truck trips transported supplies to Palm Beach County. Thirty-eight motorboats and four airplanes also delivered supplies.

On September 23, Georgia Governor Lamartine Griffin Hardman urged his state to assist "in every possible way." Every Catholic church in the United States contributed a portion of their offering on November 18, with $84,200 ($1.25 million in 2025) in aid given to Florida, and Masonic lodges nationwide collectively donated over $107,000 ($1.58 million in 2025). Palm Beach casino owner E. R. Bradley, banker J. P. Morgan, and the San Francisco city council each donated $10,000 ($147,913 in 2025) to ARC, while gubernatorial candidate Doyle E. Carlton collected about $10,000 ($147,913 in 2025) in Tampa and distributed the money to people in Okeechobee. Issaquena County, Mississippi, among the most ravaged by the Great Mississippi Flood of 1927, also contributed money. A West Palm Beach creamery quickly distributed 1,400 US gal (5,300 L; 1,200 imp gal) of milk. The Palm Beach County Farm Loan Fund offered eligible farmers $300 loans ($4,437 in 2025) with a 5% interest rate. In Miami, WQAM hosted a fundraiser that included live entertainment from a Shriners band, collecting about $1,000 ($14,791 in 2025) for hurricane victims. The city of Miami also donated 2 tanks of chlorine, 20 barrels of disinfectant, 24 lanterns, and 5,000 paper cups.

Following reports of looting, West Palm Beach Police Chief Frank H. Matthews ordered a sunset-to-sunrise curfew, unless a person possessed a pass or permit signed by Matthews, his assistant, or the ARC, or had "an extreme emergency." On September 19, Governor Martin summoned all Florida Army National Guard members to serve in other functions as well as patrolling against looting, while militia members and 124th Infantry Regiment personnel already surveilled the city. Palm Beach officials declared martial law on September 19 after several mansions were robbed but rescinded it the following day. Palm Beach County Sheriff Robert C. Baker ordered checkpoints along the main highways at Lake Worth and Jupiter.

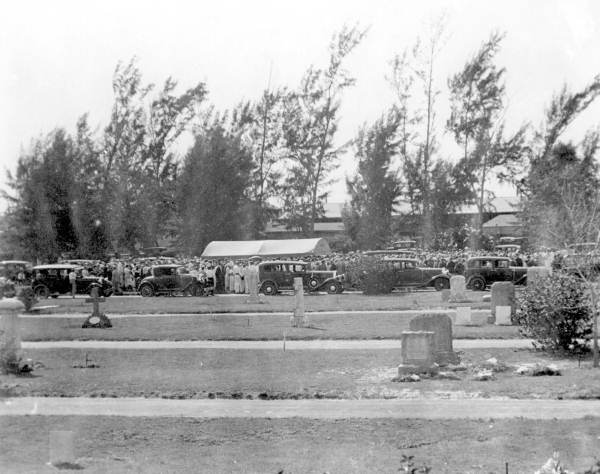
Funeral procession for bodies buried at Woodlawn Cemetery in West Palm Beach

Southern Bell and AT&T quickly began work on restoring telephone service, sending workers from their centers in Atlanta and Jacksonville, respectively. The companies shipped about 225 tons of copper wire, 20 rail car-loads full of poles, and another with switchboards. By the morning of September 18, water service was restored in central West Palm Beach and expected to expand to other areas of the city quickly. Concerns spread about possible contamination from the Lake Okeechobee region after the city's water source, Clear Lake, overflowed. However, officials reported that a high ridge separated the former and the latter for a distance of approximately 6 to 8 mi (9.7 to 12.9 km), with runoff from Lake Okeechobee instead flowing through canals. Tests also confirmed the potability of the city's drinking water. While restoring electricity in West Palm Beach, a lineman was electrocuted on November 1.

On September 19, West Palm Beach Mayor Vincent Oaksmith ordered all able-bodied men to work toward relief efforts; the Delray Beach City Council issued a similar directive. Initially, rebuilding in West Palm Beach was slow. On September 20, the West Palm Beach City Commission voted to fine individuals up to $500 ($7,396 in 2025) and imprison them for a maximum of 30 days if they price gouged and to allow the city treasurer to authorize an in advance requisition payment of $50,000 ($739,564 in 2025) to the ARC. The city issued 3,165 permits for building and major repairs between October 1 and June 30, 1929, and condemned many severely damaged buildings for demolition in October 1928. However, 300 condemned structures remained standing until June 1930, when the city manager was finally authorized to execute the order. In October 1928 alone, local officials approved permits for repair work projects exceeding $2 million ($29.6 million in 2025) for Palm Beach and West Palm Beach combined. Approximately 50 men shoveled sand off Ocean Boulevard in Palm Beach and cut down damaged palm trees. Mayor Barclay Harding Warburton I predicted in September 1928 that the hurricane would not impact on tourism during the upcoming winter season, but the Royal Poinciana Hotel only partly reopened.

Because of disabled vehicles, flooded roads, and limited food and water supplies at the south shore Lake Okeechobee communities, Dr. William Buck, likely the only doctor between Pahokee and Moore Haven, ordered nearly 200 women and children to walk to West Palm Beach – a distance of approximately 40 mi (64 km) – seen as their best chance for survival. After several miles, the women and children encountered ambulances from West Palm Beach. Dr. Buck also delegated volunteers to clear the roads near Lake Okeechobee and break into the ice house, a source of fresh water. By the afternoon of September 20, they cleared the roads from Belle Glade to the agricultural station, Chosen, and South Bay. Later, in collaboration with United States Coast Guard personnel from Fort Lauderdale, they cleared the road between Belle Glade and Pahokee, with workers piling debris up to 5 ft (1.5 m) above the ground.

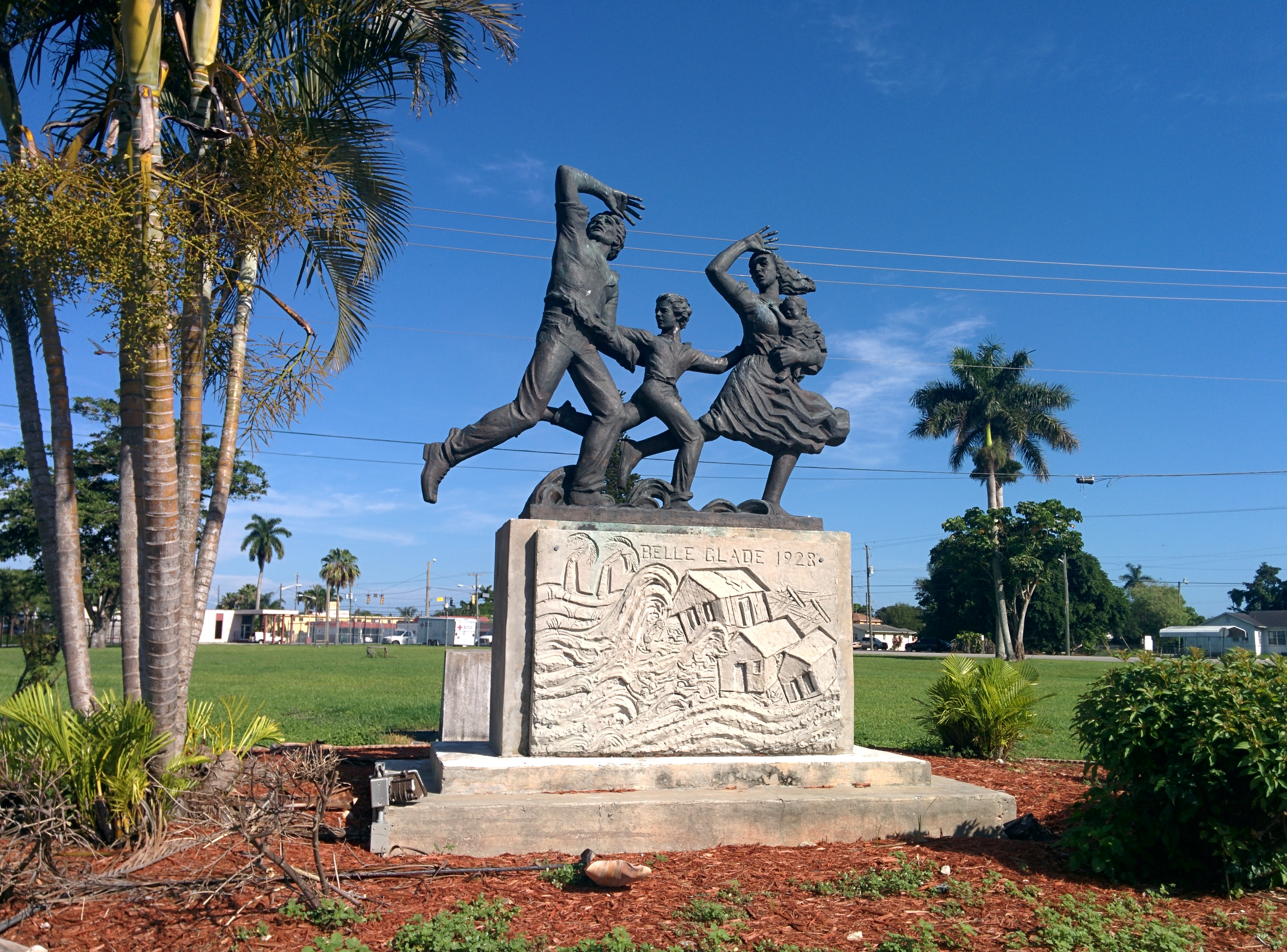
A statue in Belle Glade commemorating the hurricane

Governor John W. Martin, along with Florida Attorney General Fred Henry Davis, chief engineer Fred C. Elliott, and Florida Adjutant General Vivian B. Collins, assessed the disaster area in the communities along Lake Okeechobee beginning on September 22. After the conclusion of the tour, Martin telegraphed every mayor in Florida to aid the victims of the storm and apologized for not issuing that appeal sooner. Martin also described the scene:

In the six miles between Pahokee and Belle Glade I counted twenty-seven corpses in water or on the roadside but not taken from the water. Total dead on the roadside and not buried and counted but not in plank coffins was one hundred and twenty-six. In six additional miles over five hundred and thirty-seven bodies were already interred. Fifty-seven additional bodies were hauled out of this area today in trucks and tonight four truck loads of bodies were brought from adjoining areas by boat, loaded, and sent to West Palm Beach for burial. One military officer reported to me that while in Belle Glade today for thirty minutes, ten bodies were brought in and added to the pile of bodies, thirty-seven in one pile and sixty in the other.

— Governor John W. Martin,

Belle Glade rebuilt throughout the next 10 years, including a new town hall in 1929. By December 1928, residents had replanted crops and reconstructed some homes. In the meantime, most storm survivors in Belle Glade lived in two tent cities along the Hillsboro Canal, one for whites and the other for black people. The population of some towns around Lake Okeechobee grew significantly during the Great Depression due to people seeking to earn a living through the agricultural and natural resources industries. However, Chosen, Fruitcrest, Okeelanta, and the island communities of Lake Okeechobee never recovered. Additionally, the construction of the Herbert Hoover Dike stunted economic growth in Canal Point due to a significant decrease in boating traffic.

Plans to build a Hollywood-esque city in Martin County featuring a movie studio called Picture City fell through following the 1928 hurricane and subsequent economic collapse. A bridge connecting Stuart and Palm City remained closed for months; a temporary ferry service provided transportation across the St. Lucie River until repairs were completed in the summer of 1929. In Okeechobee County, the bridge formerly spanning the Onosohatchee River was retrieved and re-placed in January 1929 using hoists and three river dredges, allowing the Conners Highway to fully reopen for the first time since the storm.

In the aftermath of the hurricane in Florida, it became apparent that well-constructed buildings with shutters had suffered less damage from winds that caused serious structural problems to lesser buildings. Structures with well-constructed frames and those made of steel, concrete, brick, or stone were largely immune to the winds. One lasting result of the 1928 cyclone and the 1926 hurricane, when a similar pattern had been noticed, was improved building codes. West Palm Beach, for example, adopted the Florida Building Officials' conference guidelines in October 1928, which included new requirements for using concrete, tightening masonry walls with a reinforced band course, and fastening roofs to walls.

=== American Red Cross ===
A total of 3,390 ARC volunteers assisted with relief efforts. Overall, individual contributions to the organization reached almost $5.9 million ($87.3 million in 2025), while the ARC itself spent about $50,000 ($739,564 in 2025) of its own funds. Many donations to the organization came after New York City Mayor Jimmy Walker and President Calvin Coolidge bought a full-page advertisement in The New York Times. The ARC expenditures included about $1.3 million ($192 million in 2025) for building and repairs, $346,300 ($5.12 million in 2025) for household goods, $157,300 ($2.33 million in 2025) for clothing, $137,000 ($2.03 million in 2025) for food, $121,200 ($1.79 million in 2025) for agricultural supplies and equipment, $115,500 ($1.71 million in 2025) for family aid and service registration, $115,000 ($1.7 million in 2025) for field expenses, $83,200 ($1.23 million in 2025) for general tool and equipment expenses, $71,800 ($1.06 million in 2025) for medical services, $66,800 ($988,058 in 2025) for grants to local chapters, $60,300 ($891,914 in 2025) for relief camps, $45,900 ($678,920 in 2025) for rescue work, $39,800 ($588,693 in 2025) for boarding and lodging of storm victims, $19,900 ($294,347 in 2025) for other miscellaneous expenses, $11,000 ($162,704 in 2025) for the transportation of storm victims, and $5,000 ($73,956 in 2025) for the Junior Red Cross.

Many local ARC chapters in Florida sheltered refugees, donated goods and supplies, or otherwise provided assistance to storm victims. In Dade County, the Miami Red Cross Citizens Relief Committee was established and provided "hundreds of loaves of bread, gallons of milk, pounds of coffee and sugar, blankets, cots, and medical supplies.", according to the Miami Herald.

In collaboration with the Extension Division of the United States Department of Agriculture, the ARC provided seeds, fertilizer, feed, and gasoline and oil for farmers suffering severe losses. The Ford Motor Company sent two trucks of tractor parts and two mechanical experts from their plant in Jacksonville. The ARC established 22 canteens and emergency feeding centers, provided repair services to 3,624 structures, shifted 81 homes back to their foundations, anchored 704 dwellings to concrete foundation piers, and opened two tent cities after the shelters originally housing storm refugees all closed by October 6, with the United States Army providing the tents. A total of 10,172 families applied for aid with the ARC by October 28, about two-thirds of whom resided in Palm Beach County. Eligible families in the Lake Okeechobee region received grants averaging $672.46 ($9,947 in 2025), at a time when four-bedroom frame homes cost approximately $1,000 ($14,791 in 2025) to construct, although grants awarded to eastern Palm Beach County residents averaged about $2,100 ($31,062 in 2025). The national ARC organization withdrew from the disaster area on March 1, 1929, and returned relief responsibilities to local chapters.

The ARC faced claims of skimping on aid given to some people and racial discrimination. Some large families reportedly received as little as a $2 $29.58 in 2025) grocery card, while a woman who lost her home claimed to have only obtained a few articles of old clothes and a few food items for her family. The Chicago Defender quoted Grace P. Campbell, a chair of the Negro Workers' Relief committee, as stating that black people received only about 20% of the dispersed relief. The ARC, The Salvation Army, and educator Mary McLeod Bethune refuted claims of partiality in a telegram to the National Association for the Advancement of Colored People (NAACP). In fact, the ARC had established a Colored Advisory Committee, composed of local volunteers who could provide relief without prejudice and investigate claims of discrimination relating to aid offered by the organization.

=== Racial issues ===
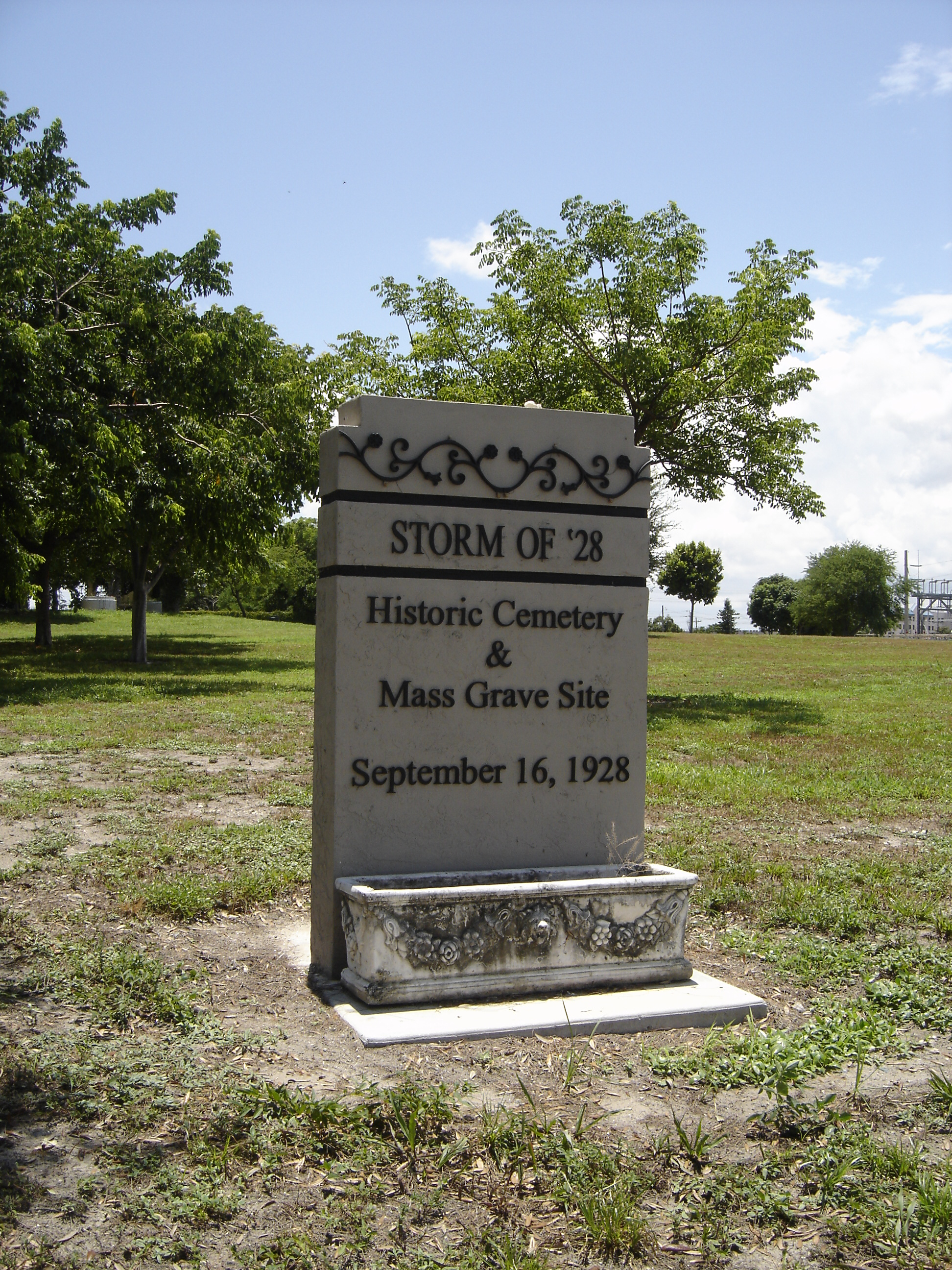
The mass burial site in West Palm Beach

The economically poor areas in the low-lying ground around Lake Okeechobee saw the highest death tolls by far. Around 75% of the fatalities were among migrant farm workers, most of whom were black people. The Florida National Guard ordered many black men, at gunpoint, to collect bodies, fatally shooting one man, Coot Simpson, for refusing to do so. Despite Prohibition laws at the time, those searching and collecting bodies received rations of bootleg whiskey, provided by a local rum-runner. The body collectors received gloves that were regularly disinfected. They would usually tie about half a dozen bodies together by the ankle and then load them onto trucks. After the truck departed, the men received their ration of whiskey. This process continued day and night until October, while the search for bodies stopped on November 1 because of a lack of funds to continue doing so.

Due to racial segregation at the time, the coffins provided were used for the white victims, most of whom received a proper burial at Woodlawn Cemetery in West Palm Beach. The bodies of the black victims and those whose race could not be identified were disposed of by other means, sometimes burned in funeral pyres, but many were placed into mass graves, including about 1,600 in Port Mayaca, 674 at the pauper's cemetery, at least 22 in Miami Locks (now known as Lake Harbor), 28 in Ortona, and 22 in Sebring. There were also unconfirmed reports of bodies buried at Loxahatchee. Following the burial, Mayor Oaksmith proclaimed an hour of mourning on October 1 for the deceased. Several local clergymen conducted a funeral service, attended by about 3,000 people, including Bethune. A memorial was placed at Woodlawn Cemetery to honor victims of the storm, unlike at the pauper's cemetery.

During the next several decades, the black mass burial site in West Palm Beach remained largely forgotten by the public. The city later sold the property, which switched ownership multiple times over the years. In 1991, the property was owned by a private individual when the Sankofa Society conducted a blessing ceremony at the site, well-publicized by the local media. Around that time, Robert Hazard, a resident of West Palm Beach, established the Storm of '28 Memorial Park Coalition Inc. to fight for recognition of the black victims of the storm. In December 2000, the city of West Palm Beach purchased the land back for $180,000 (2000 USD; $319,301 in 2025). The site was listed on the National Register of Historic Places in 2002 and a historical marker was added in 2003 during the 75th anniversary of the hurricane. The inequity has caused ongoing racial friction that still exists. The effects of the hurricane on black migrant workers is dramatized in Zora Neale Hurston's novel Their Eyes Were Watching God.

=== Economic aftermath ===
Before the storm, the Florida land boom had already been faltering due to corrupt real estate deals and the 1926 Miami hurricane. Potential investors and buyers became skeptical about purchasing land in Florida. The 1928 hurricane compounded these problems, with James C. Clark of the Orlando Sentinel stating that it "killed off what remained of the boom and the Great Depression came to Florida a year before striking the rest of the nation." In West Palm Beach, real estate costs dropped 53 percent to $41.6 million (1930 USD; $637 million in 2025) between 1929 and 1930 and further to only $18.2 million (1935 USD; $336 million in 2025) by 1935. Prior to the Wall Street Crash of 1929, several hotels in the area declared bankruptcy, attempted to find new investors, or changed names and management. Kristin Sweeting stated in The Bradenton Herald that "by January 1929, the dream of the Florida life had been blown away with loss: the loss of life, land value, life savings and the potential for more devastation from future storms."

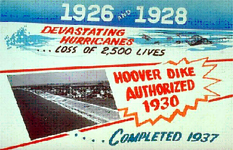
A sign advertising the initial completion of the Hoover Dike

By 1929, Mediterranean fruit flies arrived in Florida in Orange County, further damaging the citrus industry. The federal and state governments expended roughly $7 million (1929 USD; $251 million in 2025), $19 million ($280 million in 2025) for eradication efforts and banned fruits and vegetables from leaving a quarantine zone, which comprised roughly 34% of Florida's land and almost 75% of its citrus crops. Tourism also saw a serious decline in the aftermath of the 1928 hurricane and subsequent Great Depression. Programs established by the New Deal and Florida Governor David Sholtz brought some relief to the economic slump, but the region remained in an abysmal financial state until the United States entered World War II.

Because of the collapsing economic boom and increasing publicity surrounding the corrupt real estate deals, the severity of the disaster in Southeast Florida was sometimes downplayed. For example, G. A. Nash of the Tampa Board of Trade sent a telegram to the United States Chamber of Commerce in Washington, D.C., on September 17, informing them that "reports of storm damage greatly exaggerated. Damage negligible and confined almost entirely to Palm Beach section." and that "exaggerated reports unfair and will do Florida great harm." The board even considered protesting news agencies that wrote "exaggerated" reports and warned that there would be requests for retraction. The Tampa Morning Tribune owner, Peter O. Knight, described the hurricane as "trivial." Knight received harsh criticism for marginalizing the disaster, with Palm Beach County Red Cross Chairman Howard Selby responding with a telegram stating, "If you serve as a spokesman for the entire state, won't you kindly make a personal visit here?," while the Okeechobee News called Knight "a jackass."

=== Herbert Hoover Dike ===
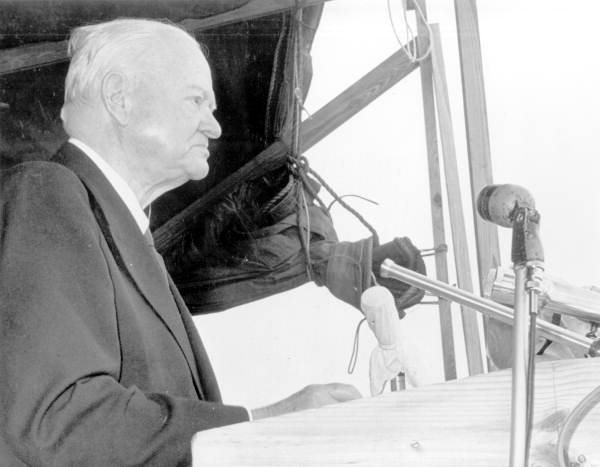
Former President Herbert Hoover speaking at the dedication ceremony in Clewiston in 1961

To prevent a recurrence of natural disasters such as the 1926 Miami and 1928 Okeechobee hurricanes, the Florida Legislature established the Okeechobee Flood Control District during its 1929 session, following congressional testimony from Bror G. Dahlberg, Davis, Eliott, Congressmen Herbert J. Drane and William J. Sears, former Congressman Walter F. Lineberger, and U.S. Senator Park Trammell. The Okeechobee Flood Control District also received authorization to collaborate with the United States Army Corps of Engineers (USACE) on flood control initiatives. After President Herbert Hoover's visit to South Florida in February 1929, the USACE created a new plan that called for the construction of floodway channels, control gates, and large levees lining the shores of Lake Okeechobee. This long-term system was designed to facilitate flood control, conserve water, block saltwater, and protect fish and wildlife populations. Congress then approved the Rivers and Harbors Act of 1930, signed into law by President Hoover.

Between 1932 and 1938, the Corps constructed levees ranging from 32 to 35 ft (9.8 to 10.7 m) in height. After its initial completion, Congress reported in 1943 that total expenditures reached at least $23 million (1943 USD; $342 million in 2025), $19 million ($342 million in 2025) of which funded the original construction. Flooding caused by hurricanes in 1947 and the passage of the Flood Control Act of 1948 led to the dike being expanded. A dedication ceremony was held in Clewiston on January 12, 1961, and included a speech from former President Hoover. Completed in the late 1960s, the dike – with a maximum height of 41 ft (12 m), a length of about 143 mi (230 km), a base width of 125 to 140 ft (38 to 43 m), and a top width of 10 to 30 ft (3.0 to 9.1 m) – almost completely encloses the lake, except at Fisheating Creek, the only remaining free-flowing tributary of Lake Okeechobee.

Studies as far back as the 1980s indicated long-term problems with piping and erosion. Leaks have been reported after several heavy rain events. From 2007 to 2016, the USACE spent $500 million (2016 USD; $656 million in 2025) on improving the dike, then considered one of the most at-risk of failing in the United States. Next, the construction firm Treviicos inserted approximately 7,200,000 sq ft (670,000 m^{2}) of cutoff wall into the Hoover Dike between December 2016 and late 2022, effectively creating a dam inside a dam. That year, TCPalm noted that a USACE inspection revealed that the dike "is safer today than it has ever been going into a storm."

== See also ==
- List of disasters in the United States by death toll
- List of Florida hurricanes (1900–1949)
- Effects of the 1947 Fort Lauderdale hurricane in Florida
- Effects of the 1928 Okeechobee hurricane in the Caribbean
- 1949 Florida hurricane
- History of Palm Beach County, Florida
