= Richard and Pat Johnson Palm Beach County History Museum =

Coordinates: 26°42′56.5″N 80°3′11″W

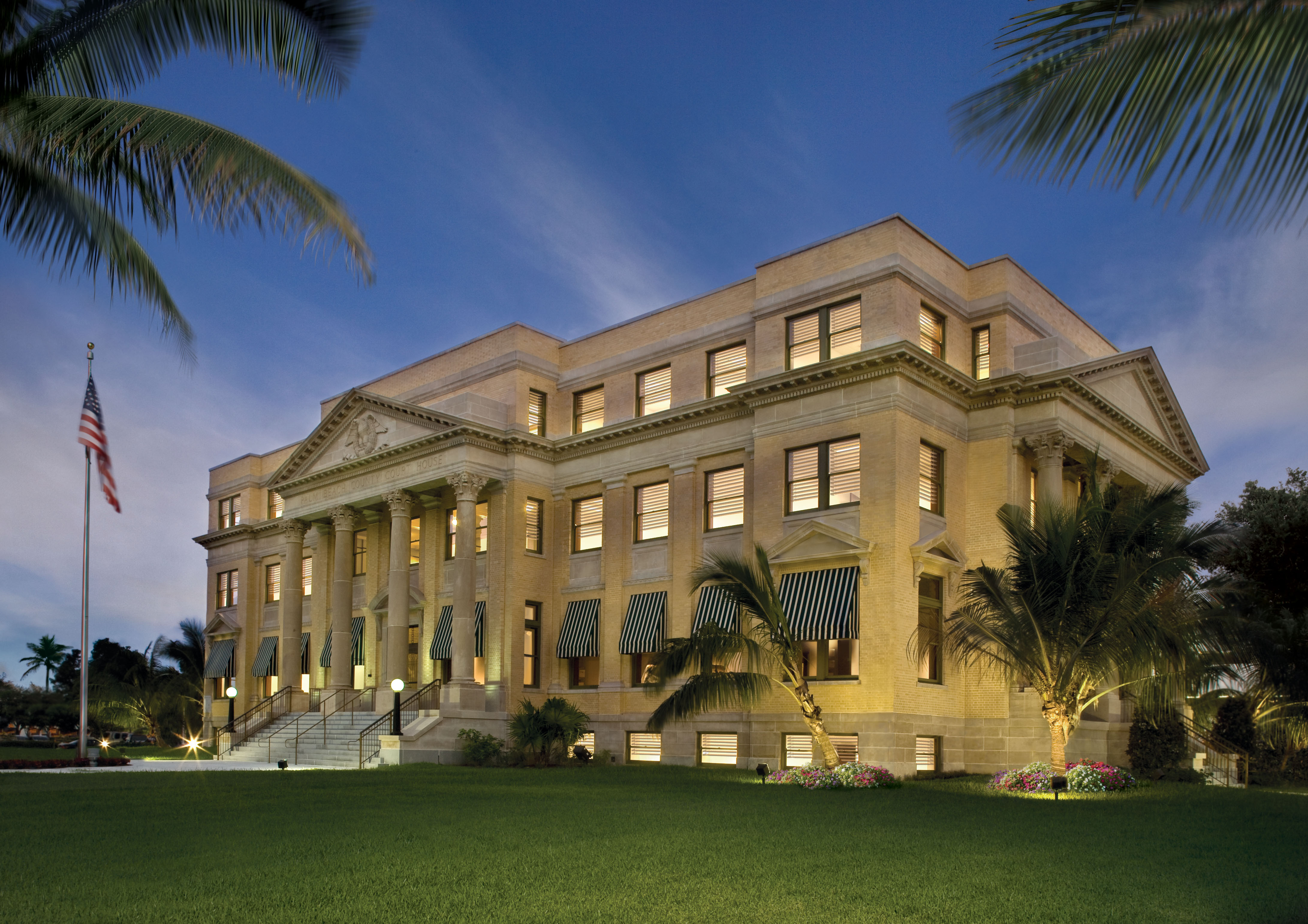
Pat Johnson Palm Beach County History Museum in the 1916 Palm Beach County Courthouse

The Richard and Pat Johnson Palm Beach County History Museum is a history museum in West Palm Beach, Palm Beach County, Florida. The museum's exhibits and collection cover local history, with a permanent collection of millions of objects and images that span over 12,000 years of Palm Beach County and Florida history. The museum offers multiple exhibits, ranging from online collections to in-person displays, including both its permanent People and Places galleries as well as temporary special exhibits that open each fall, located in the Courtroom Gallery on the third floor of the 1916 courthouse. It is operated by the Historical Society of Palm Beach County. The museum is housed in a 1916 courthouse building, at 300 North Dixie Highway.

== History ==
With construction beginning in 1916, and finally concluding in 1917, the historic “old county courthouse” that currently houses the Richard and Pat Johnson Palm Beach County History Museum served as the location for all County offices as well as its one courtroom. Prior to the 1916 courthouse, Palm Beach County had all of its offices in an old schoolhouse in West Palm Beach. The first county officer to occupy the building was county tax assessor James M. Owens, along with his deputy Myrtle Miller.

After the onset of World War II, additions were constructed to protect the original building, which by 1972, had enclosed the entire courthouse. In 2002 it was slated for destruction, several years after a new complex opened right across the street. However, after a push from the community to preserve a piece of Palm Beach County history, the Board of County Commissioners eventually voted to spend nearly $20 million to restore it. Restoration did not begin until a couple years later in 2004, in which the wraparound structure that encased the original building was removed, along with several other additions.
