= Vedado Historic District =

Historic district in Florida, United States

- U.S. National Register of Historic Places
- U.S. Historic district
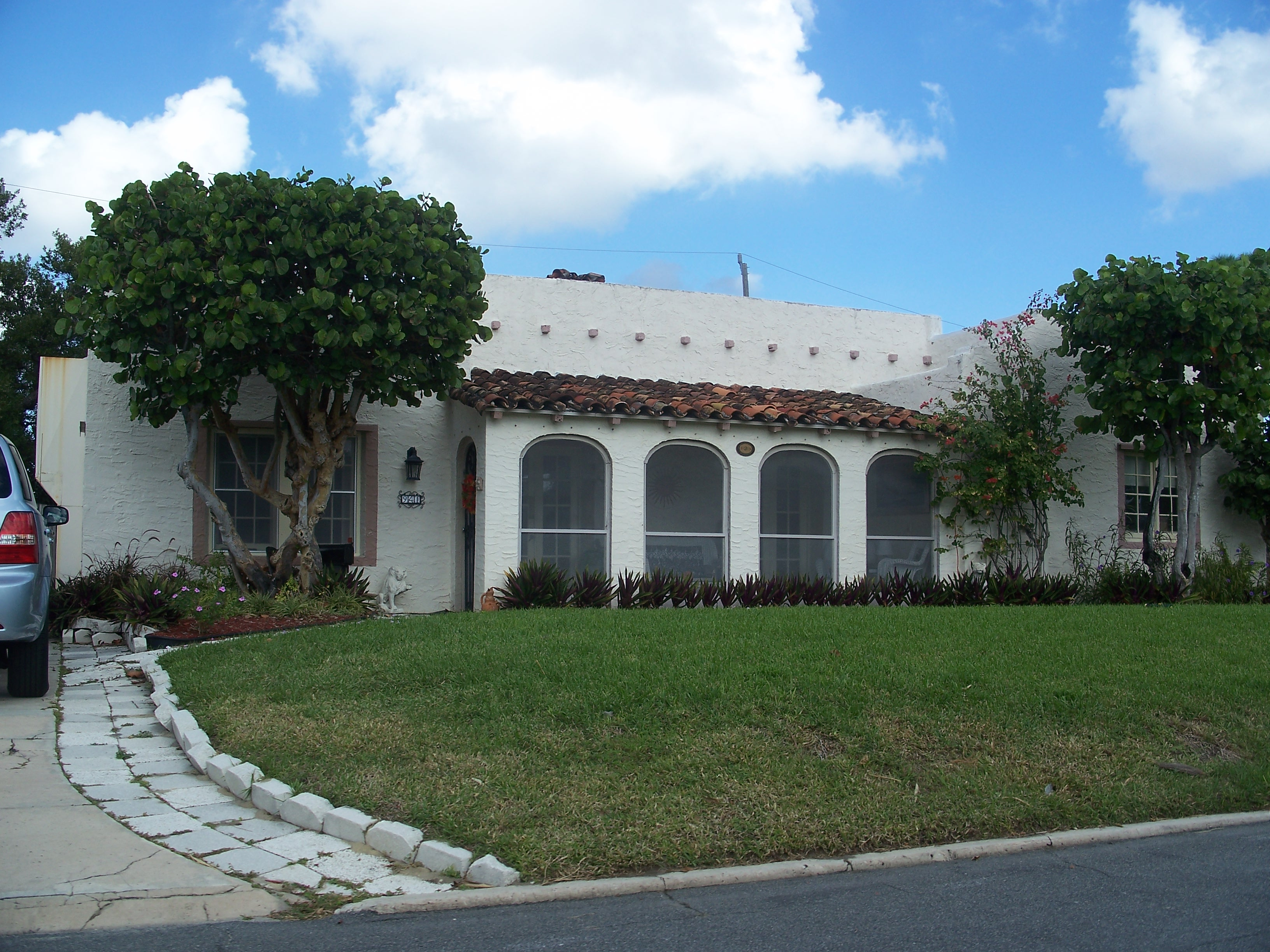
- Vedado Historic District

- Location within Florida Location within the United States
- Location: West Palm Beach, Florida
- Coordinates: 26°40′39″N 80°03′54″W
- NRHP reference No.: 10000821
- Added to NRHP: October 15, 2010

Vedado Historic District is a national historic district in West Palm Beach, Florida in Palm Beach County. Including primarily one-story buildings constructed between 1947 and 1957 as well as the Land Boom from 1924 to 1928, it is bounded by Merril Ave, Southern Blvd, Parker Ave, and Paseo Morella.

It was added to the National Register of Historic Places in 2010.

== History ==
The present-day Vedado Historic District in West Palm Beach, Florida, was first developed during the Florida land boom of the 1920s. In 1924, Clarence J. Ohmer paid $67,500 for the property of Alida Bell, with the intention of the sale leading to the creation of lots and blocks. The Ohmer family then sold the property in September for $1 to the Suburban Development Company. In November 1924, the first plat was recorded, which included 15 blocks ranging from 6 to 27 lots in size and a park. An advertisement in The Palm Beach Post that year touted that "Vedado is different because we are using the "highest type of street construction and working out a beautiful park effect" and that "we have taken care of the ‘kiddies’ by setting aside more that 40,000 square feet of space for a playground", while lots then cost $30 to $40 per front foot.

Between 1925 and 1926, Vedado's first homes were developed. Although news of real estate scams beginning in the mid-1920s, two hurricanes in 1926 and 1928, and the Great Depression all decimated the local economy, the National Register of Historic Places (NRHP) registration form for the Vedado Historic District noted that "The Vedado Subdivision’s proximity to Morrison Field made it a familiar location for returning veterans." Now known as the Palm Beach International Airport, Morrison Field served as a military facility during World War II, with more than 6,000 aircraft landing there and approximately 3,000 United States Army Air Forces stationed at that site. During the war, about 27% of homes, then numbering about 94, were owned by active military personnel.

After World War II, the Vedado neighborhood underwent another period of significant development from 1946 to 1956, with at least 10 homes constructed in 1947, 1950, 1951, and 1952. Although this section of West Palm Beach is sometimes referred to as the Vedado-Hillcrest Historic District, most of the Hillcrest neighborhood was demolished in the late 1980s as part of a federal buyout program for expansion of the Palm Beach International Airport. Much of the former Hillcrest section is now occupied by Palm Beach Atlantic University's Marshall and Vera Lea Rinker Athletic Campus. Locally, the district has been included on the West Palm Beach Register of Historic Places since 2007. The Vedado Historic District has been listed as part of the NRHP since October 15, 2010.

== Architecture ==
Several architectural styles are present throughout the district, including Contemporary, Minimal Traditional, Minimal Ranch, Mediterranean Revival, Mission Revival, Monterey, Ranch, Split Level, and Vernacular.

== Structures ==
Of the 130 resources in the Vedado Historic District, 81 are considered contributing, including 80 structures and 1 site, Vedado Park, constructed in 1924. Additionally, 49 resources are considered non-contributing. These structures were either significantly altered or constructed after the period of significance, including the Vedado Park Community Center, built around 2000. The following are listed as contributing:

Address/Name	Year built	Style	Structure type	Notes
Vedado Park	1924	Landscape		
3632 Glenwood Road	1952	Ranch	Residence	
3629/3631 Parker Avenue	1947	Ranch	Duplex	
3635/3637 Parker Avenue	1947	Ranch	Duplex	
3701/3703 Parker Avenue	1947	Ranch	Duplex	
3709 Parker Avenue	1952	Ranch	Residence	
3805/3807 Parker Avenue	1952	Ranch	Duplex	
3632 Parker Avenue	1947	Frame Vernacular	Residence	
3815 Parker Avenue	1955	Ranch	Residence	
3823 Parker Avenue	1955	Ranch	Residence	
3835 Parker Avenue	1955	Ranch	Residence	
3639 Paseo Andalusia	1926	Mission Revival	Residence	
3705 Paseo Andalusia	1952	Ranch	Residence	
3709 Paseo Andalusia	1952	Minimal Traditional	Residence	
3715 Paseo Andalusia	1951	Ranch	Residence	
3721 Paseo Andalusia	1951	Minimal Traditional	Residence	
3805 Paseo Andalusia	1950	Minimal Traditional	Residence	
3809 Paseo Andalusia	1952	Minimal Ranch	Residence	
3815 Paseo Andalusia	1949	Ranch	Residence	
904/905 Paseo Andorra	1950	Ranch	Duplex	
910 Paseo Andorra	1952	Minimal Traditional	Residence	
916 Paseo Andorra	1953	Ranch	Residence	
920 Paseo Andorra	1950	Minimal Ranch	Residence	
926 Paseo Andorra	1925	Mediterranean Revival	Residence	
927 Paseo Andorra	1925	Mission Revival	Residence	
934 Paseo Andorra	1947	Minimal Traditional	Residence	Also includes elements of Spanish-style architecture
940 Paseo Andorra	1951	Ranch	Residence	
946 Paseo Andorra	1946	Minimal Traditional	Residence	A home formerly owned by Phillip Rowe, a manager at the Lake Court and Pennsylvania hotels in West Palm Beach
1001 Paseo Andorra	1948	Minimal Traditional	Residence	A home formerly owned by the Rowan family. Charlie Rowan, who lived there for approximately 60 years as of 2010, was considered the "mayor" of Vedado
1002 Paseo Andorra	1951	Contemporary	Residence	
1009 Paseo Andorra	1952	Ranch	Residence	
1014 Paseo Andorra	1952	Contemporary	Residence	
1015 Paseo Andorra	1951	Minimal Traditional	Residence	
1020 Paseo Andorra	1952	Contemporary	Residence	
1021 Paseo Andorra	1951	Minimal Traditional	Residence	
1025 Paseo Andorra	1950	Minimal Traditional	Residence	
1028 Paseo Andorra	1950	Minimal Ranch	Residence	
920 Paseo Castalla	1947	Minimal Traditional	Residence	
934 Paseo Castalla	1950	Split Level	Residence	
935 Paseo Castalla	1950	Minimal Traditional	Residence	
940 Paseo Castalla	1951	Minimal Traditional	Residence	
941 Paseo Castalla	1925	Mission Revival	Residence	
945 Paseo Castalla	1950	Minimal Traditional	Residence	
946 Paseo Castalla	1949	Minimal Traditional	Residence	
959 Paseo Castalla	1925	Mission Revival	Residence	
1000 Paseo Castalla	1946	Minimal Traditional	Residence	
1012 Paseo Castalla	1952	Minimal Traditional	Residence	
1014 Paseo Castalla	1952	Minimal Traditional	Residence	
930 Paseo Morrella	1951	Ranch	Residence	
935 Paseo Morrella	1947	Minimal Ranch	Residence	
936 Paseo Morrella	1952	Minimal Ranch	Residence	
940 Paseo Morrella	1950	Ranch	Residence	
946 Paseo Morrella	1948	Minimal Traditional	Residence	
950 Paseo Morrella	1948	Ranch	Residence	
1002 Paseo Morrella	1925	Mission Revival	Residence	
1015 Paseo Morrella	1954	Ranch	Residence	
1021 Paseo Morrella	1954	Ranch	Residence	
1025 Paseo Morrella	1950	Minimal Traditional	Residence	
3630 Paseo Navarra	1956	Minimal Ranch	Residence	
3636 Paseo Navarra	1925	Spanish Colonial	Residence	
3639 Paseo Navarra	1945	Monterey	Residence	
3710 Paseo Navarra	1956	Minimal Ranch	Residence	
3814 Paseo Navarra	1952	Contemporary	Residence	
3820 Paseo Navarra	1952	Contemporary	Residence	
3829 Paseo Navarra	1925	Mission Revival	Residence	
3829A Paseo Navarra	c. 1940		Accessory	
900-904 Paseo Palmera	1952	Ranch	Residence	
910 Paseo Palmera	1948	Contemporary	Residence	
911 Paseo Palmera	1956	Split Level	Residence	
920 Paseo Palmera	1925	Mission Revival	Residence	
921 Paseo Palmera	1927	Mediterranean Revival	Residence	
921A Paseo Palmera	c. 1927		Garage	
922 Paseo Palmera	1925	Mission Revival	Residence	
925 Paseo Palmera	1951	Ranch	Residence	
934 Paseo Palmera	1954	Ranch	Residence	
940 Paseo Palmera	1947	Minimal Traditional	Residence	Also includes some Mission Revival-style architectural elements
941 Paseo Palmera	1950	Ranch	Residence	
952 Paseo Palmera	1952	Minimal Ranch	Residence	
953 Paseo Palmera	1950	Minimal Ranch	Residence	
958 Paseo Palmera	1949	Minimal Traditional	Residence	
961 Paseo Palmera	1949	Minimal Ranch	Residence	
