= Louis Semple Clarke =

American automotive engineer (1866–1957)

- Louis Semple Clarke in 1922
- Born: 1866
- Died: January 1957 (aged 90–91); West Palm Beach, Florida
- Occupations: President, The Autocar Company
- Known for: Invention of spark plug for gasoline engines Member, South Fork Fishing and Hunting Club

Louis Semple Clarke, or Semple Clarke or simply LS, (1866–1957) was a pioneering businessman and engineer in the American automotive industry. One of the central founders of The Autocar Company, Clarke was also an inventor who made numerous contributions to the development of modern motor vehicles, including innovations in the use of the drive shaft, circulating motor oil, sparkplugs, and the American convention of placing a vehicle's steering wheel on the left.

== Family ==
Thomas Shields Clarke started out with a single river boat the “Beaver” in 1832, then by 1842 he and his brother-in -law William Thaw (1818–1889), started Clarke and Co and by 1855 his son Charles joined the firm. Originally the firm was called Clarke and Thaw and over 15 years operated a fleet of steam boats which traveled all the way to New Orleans and was the designate shipping firm for all shipping going west of Pittsburgh for the dominant Pennsylvania Railroad.

Louis was born into an influential family at an influential time in Pittsburgh Pennsylvania, a time of great economic expansion and innovation for the region and country. The names with which the Clarkes associated themselves were famous successful American and Pittsburgh industrial titans: Andrew Carnegie (1835–1919), Andrew Mellon (1855–1937), and Henry Clay Frick (1849–1919), of whom they were also members of the South Fork Fishing and Hunting Club, which owned the dam upstream. The club's dam broke in May 1889 causing the largest man-made disaster in United States history of disasters at the time, of the Great Johnstown flood.

Louis was inspired at this time of innovation and took a keen interest in new inventions and technologies. Louis's inventive nature propelled him to build a handmade camera, with which he took many of the photos which are now part of the county's historical treasure trove. As an avid photographer he was the primary person who documented the SFFHC activities prior and after the dam's collapse in May 1889. The glass plates used to take the pictures surfaced 100 years later when his granddaughter in 1991 found them in the attic. At the time she called Charles Guggenheim who had just finished a documentary on the Johnstown flood and would win an Academy Award for short documentary in 1991. Additionally, the film was narrated by David McCullough who had also written a book The Johnstown Flood in 1968 with various pictures including a picture of Louis.

Louis was probably the last man at the age of 22 to join the South Fork Fishing and Hunting Club, as his membership stock certificate is dated April 1889, although he attended the club under his father's membership since his father and various other members had founded the club in May 1879. He and other younger members were energetic about all things mechanical and given the times they placed a small steam engines on boats to cruise across Lake Conemaugh and often LS would dress up as a sailor and “man” his station.

== The Autocar Company ==
LS was an educated engineer and in the 1890s started working with his brother Charles developing motorized vehicles resulting in the Pittsburgh Motor Vehicle Company supported by brothers, John S. and James K. Clarke along with their father Charles and friend William Morgan in 1897. Initial production included a motorized tricycle and a small car, which the brothers called “The Pittsburgher.”

In 1899, the name of the company was changed to “The Autocar Company,” and operations were relocated to Ardmore, Pennsylvania, a western suburb of Philadelphia. In 1901 they produced what is considered to be this country's first multi-cylinder, shaft driven car. Initial sales brochures touted that it “cannot blow up or burn up” as well as its ease of control, to the point he taught his wife to drive, making her the first known woman driver in the county.

The new design was driven from Ardmore to the Madison Square Garden, New York City, in six hours and fifteen minutes, where it was exhibited in the New York Automobile Show of December 1901. The first eight hundred cars were equipped with steering levers, but new innovations helped the Autocar to generate another revolution in innovative design, placing the steering wheel on the left hand side of the car thus establishing the reason we currently drive on the right hand side of the road. Under the Clarke brothers, the company was an early innovator, developing the first American porcelain-insulated spark plugs– a process patented and later sold to Champion, and which still remains the basis for today's spark plugs. Other early developments included the first American shaft-driven vehicle, double-reduction gear drives, and the recirculating lube–oil system. They Clarkes contributed their engineering abilities toward the war effort as Louis also designed a naval bomb fuse which was adopted as standard and also adapted for army use. His son Louis Phillips, or LP, during the war was responsible for detonating bombs in the US and France. “For approximately the first ten years of the Autocar company's existence Clarke was president and chief engineer of the company. In later years he served the company as vice-president and consulting engineer. He sold his interest in the Autocar Co. in 1929 and retired at that time.”

== Palm Beach ==
Charles John Clarke (1833–1899) was one of the pioneers of Palm Beach, where he established a winter residence in the early 1880s. Louis's father may have been a winter visitor to the Lake Worth area as early as 1885 when he appeared in a photo with hunting and fishing party near Jupiter lighthouse. He was from Pittsburgh, where he operated a fleet of boats providing transportation between Philadelphia and Pittsburgh with his partner and brother-in-law, William Thaw. Charles liked the area so much from his first visit that he and Louisa spent the winter of 1890 - 1891 at Elijah N. Dimick's “Cocoanut Grove House” Palm Beach's only hotel at the time. The following winter, Clarke bought the hotel along with about 50 acres (200,000 m^{2}) of land from the Lake Trail to the ocean beach. He also bought 10 acres (40,000 m^{2}) more on the South Lake Trail, where the Society of the Four Arts stands today. This estate he named "Primavera" ('Springtime'). He then had constructed Palm Beach's first non-wooden residence, the first to have a genuine tile roof instead of wooden shingles, with white stucco outer walls instead of the usual shingles or clapboard. When the house was completed and landscaped at No. 8 South Lake Trail, he and Louisa moved in.

Louis also bought property in Palm Beach in 1892. Located on his father's estate, he named it “Dulciora", located on Lake Trail South, which is one of the most attractive estates at Palm Beach. He still kept his summer home in Haverford, Pennsylvania. Additionally, his brother was Thomas Shields Clarke (1860–1920), a famous artist of the time, John and James also purchased property and helped to establish the new community of West Palm Beach where they entertained their affluent friends from Pittsburgh and Philadelphia. By the 1920s West Palm had become the oasis of the East for the wealthy including later the famous Kennedys political family beginning with former United States ambassador to the United Kingdom before the Second World War of Joseph P. Kennedy Sr., 1888–1969).

Louis had two children, Winifred and L. Phillips Clarke (who also became a prominent architect in the Palm Beach and South Florida region by the 1920s). Daughter Winifred, married a West Palm Beach pioneer, Roscoe Tait Anthony is credited with having started the first Sunday School in Palm Beach and L. Phillips Clarke was an architect and with his partner, Henry Stephen Harvey, they opened a West Palm Beach office for their firm of Harvey and Clarke in 1921 and designed many of now landmark buildings in Palm Beach and West Palm Beach including the Comeau Building, the Murray Building, Guaranty Building, Gus’ Baths, Holy Trinity Episcopal Church, and the Palm Beach County Library system building all of which represent the style of an aspiring time and most are on the national register for Spanish Colonial/Mission Revival design. The Autocar Company was purchased by White Motor Company in 1953 which continued to make Autocar Trucks and then was purchased by the Volvo Trucks division of Sweden in 1981, which continued make Autocar Trucks although they were called Volvo Autocar but still used the familiar logo bow tie name plate until 2001 when it was sold to Grand Vehicle Works Holdings which also manufacturers refuse collections heavy vehicles in Hagerstown, Indiana.

== Late life ==
After retirement LS lived and died in West Palm Beach on January 6, 1957, survived by his two children and a multitude of grand and great-grandchildren.

== See also ==
- White Motor Company
- List of motorized trikes

== Sources ==
- https://web.archive.org/web/20070803161623/http://www.goldenagetruckmuseum.com/featured_truck.shtml
- https://web.archive.org/web/20080509095109/http://www.jaha.org/FloodMuseum/club.pdf
- https://web.archive.org/web/20081017061815/http://www.pennhighlands.edu/library/digital/clark.htm
- nps.gov
- https://web.archive.org/web/20090108233543/http://americanheritage.com/articles/magazine/ah/1992/7/1992_7_120.shtml
- http://americanhistory.si.edu/onthemove/collection/object_1273.html
- http://www.lwpa.org/pioneer_charles_john_clarke.html
- https://web.archive.org/web/20080627020450/http://graylocke.tripod.com/tsclarke/id12.html
