= Guaranty Building =

Guaranty Building can refer to:

- Guaranty Building (Buffalo, New York)
- Guaranty Building (Hollywood, California)
- Guaranty Building (West Palm Beach, Florida)
