= American National Bank Building (West Palm Beach, Florida) =

- U.S. National Register of Historic Places
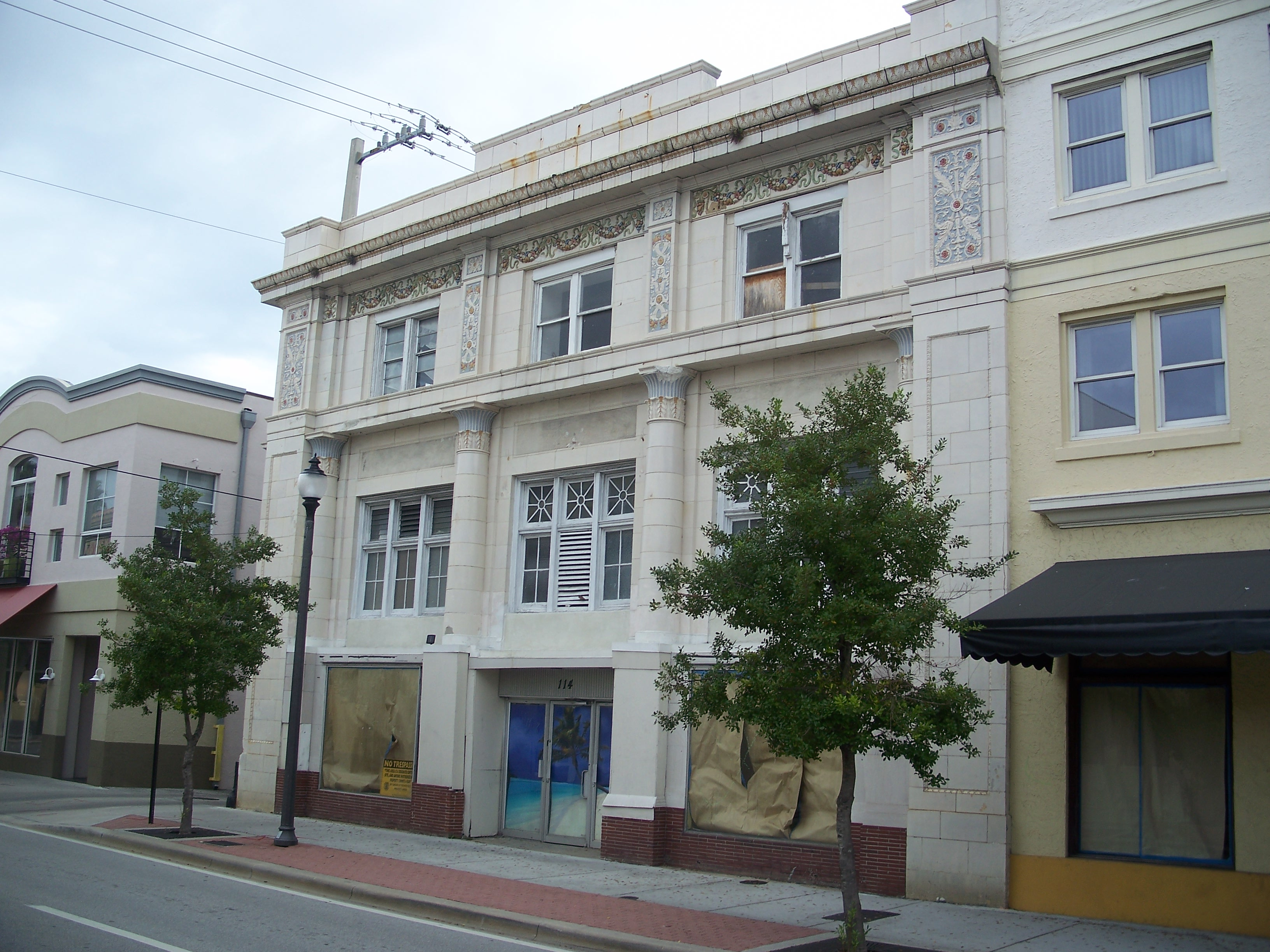

- Location within Florida Location within the United States
- Location: 114 South Olive Avenue, West Palm Beach, Florida
- Coordinates: 26°42′41.87″N 80°3′12.23″W
- Built: 1921
- Architectural style: Beaux Arts
- NRHP reference No.: 97001217
- Added to NRHP: October 8, 1997

The American National Bank Building (also known as the Commercial and Savings Bank or Morrison's Cafeteria) is a historic bank in West Palm Beach, Florida, United States. It was the first project in the city designed by local architectural firm Harvey and Clarke. The three-story Beaux Arts-style building opened at 114 South Olive Avenue in 1922 and served as a bank until 1931. Offices, including for the United States Department of Labor, and restaurants, such as Morrison's Cafeteria, later occupied the structure. On October 8, 1997, the American National Bank Building was added to the U.S. National Register of Historic Places.

== History and description ==
After World War I, Florida experienced a land boom, including in West Palm Beach. Locally, the first half of the 1920s saw the construction of many commercial structures, including the first with several floors, such as the Guaranty Building in 1922 and the Comeau Building and Dixie Court Hotel in 1925. The Palm Beach Post noted in May 1920 that a movement to organize a new national bank was underway, with stockholders being prominent businessmen and wealthy full-time and part-time residents of Palm Beach and West Palm Beach. In 1921, local businessman Bert Winters purchased land once owned by Henry Flagler, a plot along South Olive Avenue between Clematis Street and Datura Street. Winters hired the newly-established local architectural firm Harvey and Clarke to design the $100,000 building. In fact, this was the firm's first project in West Palm Beach.

Several hundred people attended the American National Bank Building's dedication on November 19, 1921, with Mayor Murray D. Carmichael, Palm Beach County Board of Commissioners chairman Hector Harris, and American National Bank President Alfred Wagg. The Palm Beach Post proclaimed that the structure would house "the most commodious and complete banking institution in the state" and be "the most imposing building in town." Located at 114 South Olive Avenue, the three-story Beaux Arts-style rectangular-shaped building contains 4,500 square feet (420 m^{2}) of interior floor space. At the time of its opening in the 1920s, the bank contained some of the newest equipment, including a vault that could not be burglarized, while also providing a teller booth specifically for women.

The American National Bank Building opened on January 2, 1922, with guests being entertained by an orchestra while receiving a tour of the place and being greeted by the bank officers and their wives. Within about a year, deposits at the bank collectively totaled more than $1 million. By 1925, another financial institution and the American National Bank merged and formed the First American National Bank and Trust Company. After the collapse of the land boom, with many local banks failing starting in 1927. Fearing a bank run, the First American National Bank and Trust Company closed. It later reopened but permanently closed in 1931. The building served as offices for the National Reemployment Services, the United States Department of Labor, and the West Palm Beach Chamber of Commerce between then and 1935, one year before Frank C. Kolb purchased the structure and used it as a location for Morrison's Cafeteria. This restaurant remained open until the mid-1970s, while title and insurance companies conducted business on the second floor until the 1960s.

On October 8, 1997, the American National Bank Building was listed on the National Register of Historic Places. A restaurant and nightclub known as Banko Cantina occupied the building from 2016 to 2025. Ketchy Shuby, another restaurant and nightclub-type facility based in New York City, is expected to open a location in the building in the fall of 2026.

== See also ==
- National Register of Historic Places listings in Palm Beach County, Florida
