= Pine Ridge Hospital =

Geography
- Location: West Palm Beach, Florida, United States

Organization
- Type: General
- Affiliated university: African American

History
- Opened: 1923
- Closed: 1956

Links
- Lists: Hospitals in Florida
- Pine Ridge Hospital
- U.S. National Register of Historic Places
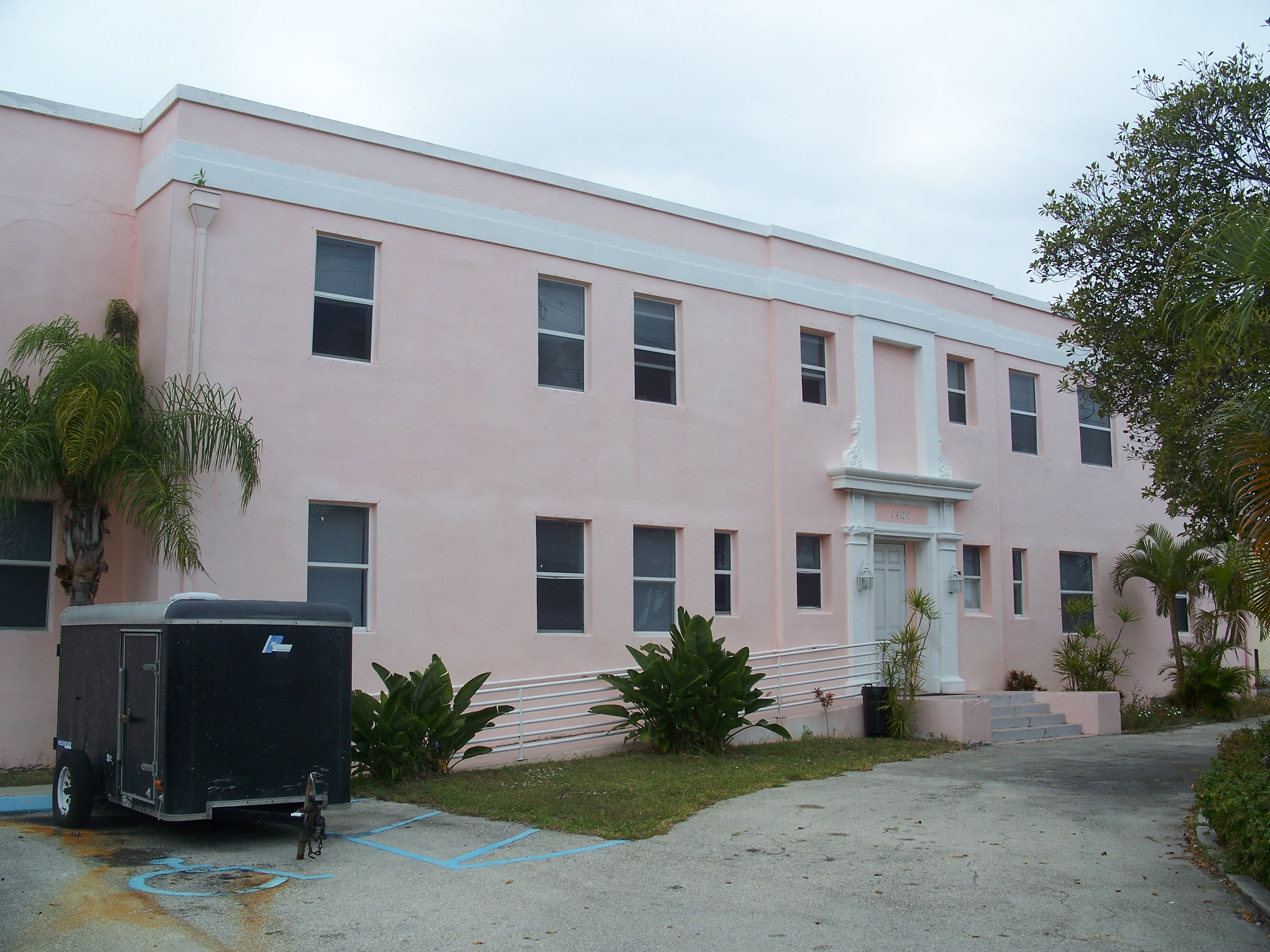

- Location within Florida Location within the United States
- Location: West Palm Beach, Florida
- Coordinates: 26°43′31″N 80°3′39″W
- Built by: Gene Bartholomew
- Architect: Harvey & Clarke
- NRHP reference No.: 00001675
- Added to NRHP: January 26, 2001

The Pine Ridge Hospital (also known as the Pine Ridge Apartments) is a historic building in West Palm Beach, Florida, that served as a hospital between 1923 and 1956. It is located at 1401 Division Avenue. The hospital was designed by West Palm Beach architects Harvey and Clarke, a two-story structure featuring masonry vernacular-style characteristics. The hospital building was deemed historically significant at a local level for its role as the sole hospital serving African-Americans in West Palm Beach in the period up to the ending of segregation in the 1960s.

Since the closure of the hospital in 1956, its former building has been vacant at times but is currently used as an apartment building, the Pine Ridge Apartments. On January 26, 2001, the Pine Ridge Hospital was added to the U.S. National Register of Historic Places.

== History and description ==
Due to Jim Crow laws, African Americans in the West Palm Beach area could not receive medical care at the all-white Good Samaritan Hospital. Around 1913, Pine Ridge Hospital, in association with Good Samaritan Hospital, was established to serve African Americans. In fact, the hospital was the only one to allow African American patients in the area until the end of segregation in the 1960s. The first building, a small, wooden structure, opened in 1916 at the intersection of Division Street and Fifth Avenue (present-day Seventh Street), near downtown. It cost approximately $1,600 to construct, a sum of money raised from African American residents and some white benefactors. However, because of the Florida land boom, which saw a significant increase of the local population due to new job opportunities, the need for a larger hospital arose.

Henry Speed, part-owner of West Palm Beach's first black-owned lumber company and a realtor, donated land in the early 1920s to be used to develop Palmview Elementary School and a new, larger Pine Ridge Hospital. In nearby Palm Beach, white philanthropists contributed much of the funds for the new building. For example, an event known as the Benefit Supper Dance for the Pine Ridge Colored Hospital was held in 1919, which raised approximately $1,800. Money was also collected via individual donations, local women's clubs, a Varnishing Day event, and a lecture from architect Henry J. Davison. Costs for erecting the planned two-story, 95 by 45 feet (29 by 14 m) structure was estimated at $36,000. Local architectural firm Harvey and Clarke designed the larger hospital building, which has two-story and masonry vernacular-style characteristics, while its construction occurred under the supervision of contractor Gene Bartholomew.

This newer iteration of the Pine Ridge Hospital opened in 1923 at 1401 Division Avenue. According to Janet G. Murphy and Carl Shiver of the Florida Bureau of Historic Preservation, "it was a well-known institution among blacks throughout the South." Despite this, and its partnership with Good Samaritan Hospital, Dr. Phillip O. Lichblau portrayed Pine Ridge Hospital as ill-equipped, noting that, "in order to get to the second floor with equipment, a wheelchair or a bed, you had to pull yourself up on a dumbwaiter supported a two-inch manila line. They had one operating room on the second floor. X-rays were developed in a makeshift darkroom behind drapes under the stairwell and with no 'light box', doctors had to hold them up to a window to read them. Instruments were a luxury and oftentimes a taxi would be sent to St. Mary's Hospital to get necessary equipment for an operation." Nevertheless, all nurses received medical certifications, as did superintendent Petra Pinn.

Pine Ridge Hospital's ownership was transferred to St. Mary's Hospital in August 1947. In 1955, the former served more than 1,600 patients, versus 428 in 1927. Pine Ridge Hospital closed in November 1956, when its patients were moved to the African American-only wing of St. Mary's Hospital. In 1963, Carl Robinson purchased the structure formerly used for the Pine Ridge Hospital and converted it into an apartment building. On January 26, 2001, the Pine Ridge Hospital was added to the National Register of Historic Places. Currently, the building is known as the Pine Ridge Apartments.

== See also ==
- National Register of Historic Places listings in Palm Beach County, Florida
- List of hospitals in Florida
