= Holy Trinity Episcopal Church (West Palm Beach, Florida) =

Episcopal church in West Palm Beach, Florida

Coordinates: 26.70717°N 80.05139°W

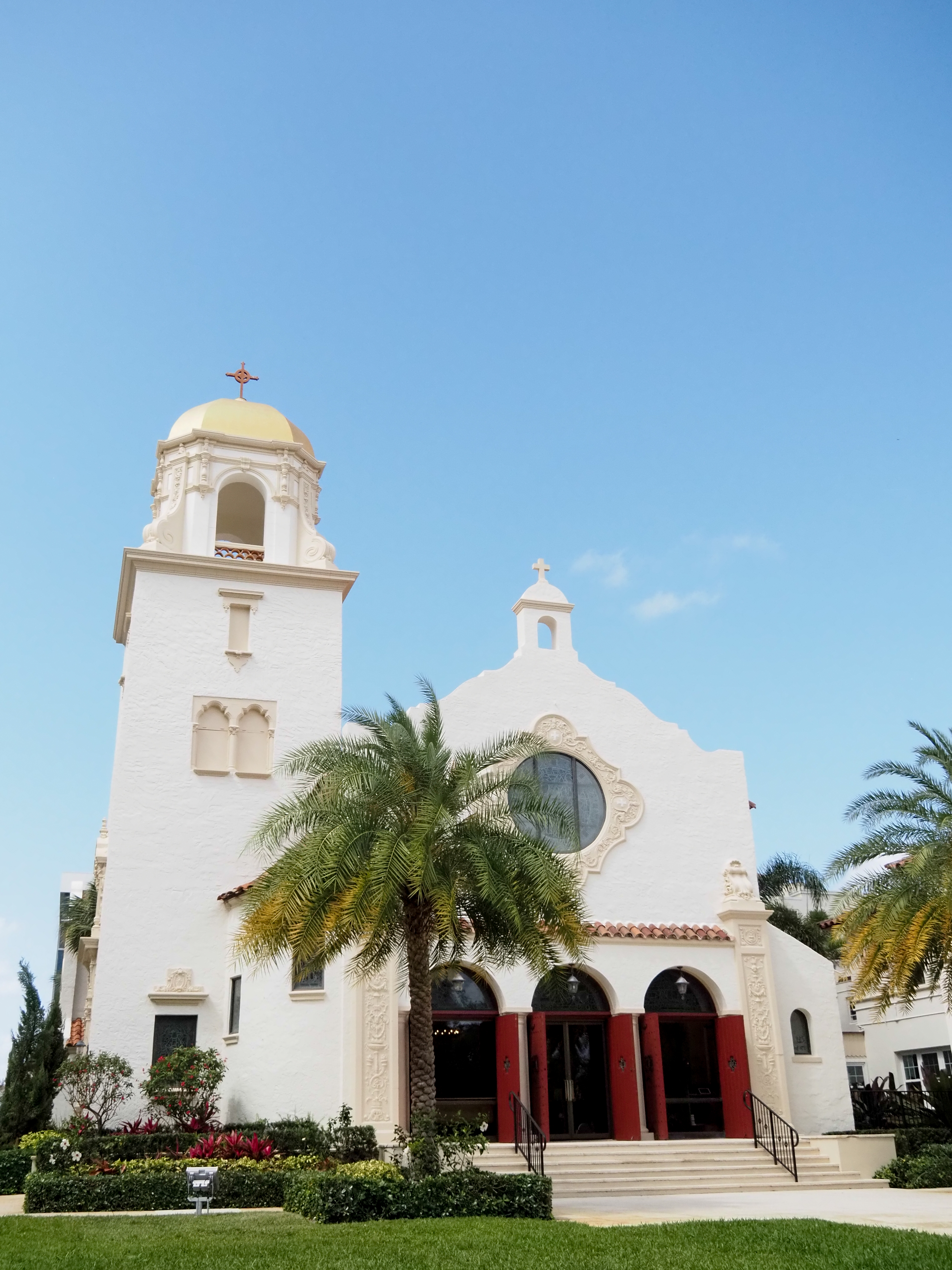
Holy Trinity in 2022

Holy Trinity Episcopal Church is a historic building at 211 Trinity Place in West Palm Beach.

== History ==
Holy Trinity Episcopal Church was formed in 1896, not long after the railroad to West Palm Beach was completed. Services were held in the community building and library known as the Free Reading Room on the lakefront. This building had been donated to the town by C. J. Clarke and was brought by barge from his property on the east side of the lake. At that time, there were about 60 resident members. A small church was erected in 1900. The two lots of land for the church donated by Henry Flagler and a Mrs. Marvin at the corner of Dixie and Evernia. The location was described as “the edge of the town and in the jungle.” The first regular services were conducted in 1897.

The building was moved in 1917 to the present location at a site costing almost $24,000 which reached from Olive to the lakefront. At 211 Trinity Place, it overlooks the Intracoastal Waterway. The first service was held in the new Spanish Colonial architecture / Mission Revival architecture building on February 24, 1924. The building was designed by L. Phillips Clarke of Harvey and Clarke, who also designed the parish hall in 1929 and the new rectory and Sunday School rooms. Wilcox Bros. were the contractors and did repair work after it suffered damage in the 1928 Okeechobee Hurricane.

== See also ==
- National Register of Historic Places listings in Palm Beach County, Florida
