= Alfred J. Comeau House =

Historic house in Florida, United States

- U.S. National Register of Historic Places
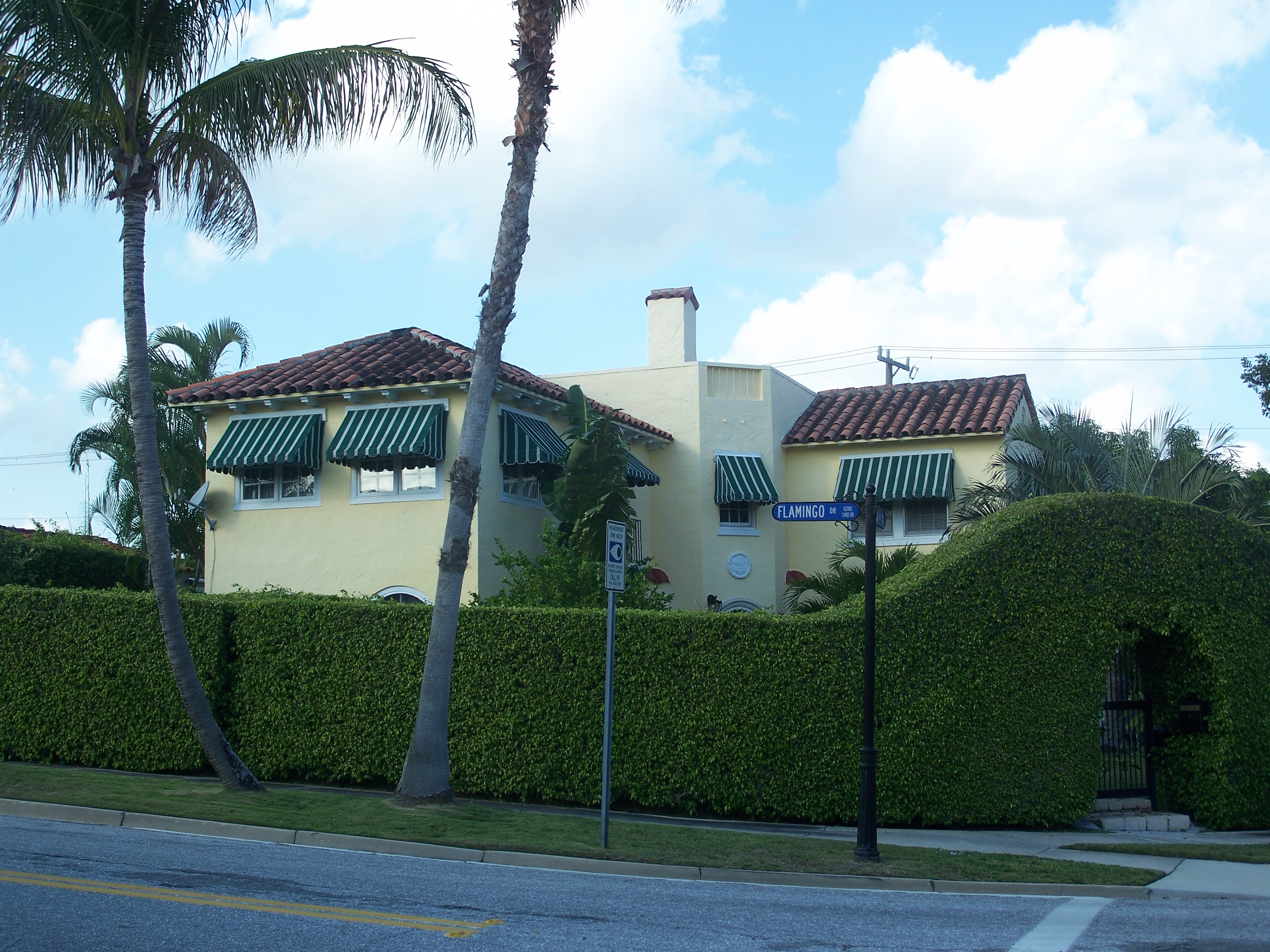

- Location within Florida Location within the United States
- Location: West Palm Beach, Palm Beach County, Florida
- Coordinates: 26°42′48″N 80°3′9″W
- Built: c. 1924
- Architects: Harvey and Clarke
- Architectural style: Mission/Spanish Revival
- Part of: Flamingo Park Historic Residential District
- NRHP reference No.: 00000238
- Added to NRHP: March 24, 2000

The Alfred J. Comeau House is a historic house at 701 Flamingo Drive in West Palm Beach, Florida, United States. Alfred J. Comeau, a businessman who established a 10-story office now known as the Comeau Building, is the namesake of this dwelling and its original owner. A two-story, L-shaped Mediterranean Revival-style structure, it was designed by Harvey and Clarke and constructed by Ernest Benjamin Walton, Sr. in 1924. On March 24, 2000, the Alfred J. Comeau House was added to the U.S. National Register of Historic Places and is a contributing property to the Flamingo Park Historic Residential District.

== History and description ==
The namesake of the house is Alfred J. Comeau, a businessman who immigrated to the West Palm Beach area of Florida from Nova Scotia in 1911. After first operating a general store, Comeau opened two local restaurants, one on Clematis Street in 1916 called "Comeau's Cafe" and the other in Palm Beach. He then ventured into the real estate industry. This included planning a 10-story office building at 317 Clematis Street, presently known as the Comeau Building. Designed by the firm Harvey and Clarke, the Comeau Building opened in 1926 and has been listed on the National Register of Historic Places (NRHP) since 1996.

A few years earlier, in 1924, Comeau bought several plots in the area now known as the Flamingo Park Historic Residential District, which was added to the NRHP in 2000. After he obtained a building permit in June 1924, Harvey and Clarke designed a house for Comeau at 701 Flamingo Drive, which was constructed by Ernest Benjamin Walton, Sr. The residence is a two-story, L-shaped Mediterranean Revival-style structure, with "major identifying features" such as "a rough stucco surface, pecky cypress woodwork, a decorative balcony, a wrought-iron grille, plaster detailing around the doors and windows, and a barrel tile roof all built around an irregular plan," according to Janet G. Murphy and Gary V. Goodwin of the Florida Bureau of Historic Preservation. Inside, the first floor includes a bathroom, dining room, foyer, living room, pantry, and sunroom, as well as a spiral staircase to the second floor. On the second floor are three bedrooms, a bathroom, and an office/wardrobe room.

However, Comeau struggled financially following the end of the 1920s Florida land boom and the beginning of the Great Depression. He sold the Comeau Building in 1932 but remained owner of the house, although other people lived there, including Philip D. Drane in 1935 and John C. Borden in 1936 and 1937. A Girl Scout council met there in 1936, about one year before Carl Winkler opened a psychology school in the house. Comeau then declared bankruptcy in 1938. A fire in 1940 severely damaged a garage. The Alfred J. Comeau House was added to the NRHP on March 24, 2000. Later that year, the Flamingo Park Historic Residential District was listed on the NRHP, with the dwelling being considered a contributing structure. There is also a garage building on the property just north of the house, but it is considered a non-contributing structure.

The residence most recently sold for $420,000 in 2012, down from almost twice ($800,000) that in 2006. Two sales for a price of $260,000 and $333,000 occurred in 1997 and 1998, respectively. However, Zillow estimates that as of mid-2026, it is worth approximately $3.7 million.

== See also ==
- National Register of Historic Places listings in Palm Beach County, Florida
