= Harvey and Clarke =

American architectural firm

Harvey and Clarke was an American architectural firm formed by Henry Stephen Harvey and L. Philips Clarke in West Palm Beach, Florida, in 1921. The firm was active in South Florida for only a few years, but in that time, designed a number of distinctive homes, apartments, churches, and commercial buildings. Harvey was a member of the West Palm Beach Planning Commission. An additional firm member and staff architect was Gustav Maass, who designed several local railroad stations and later became a noted South Florida architect in his own right.

== History ==
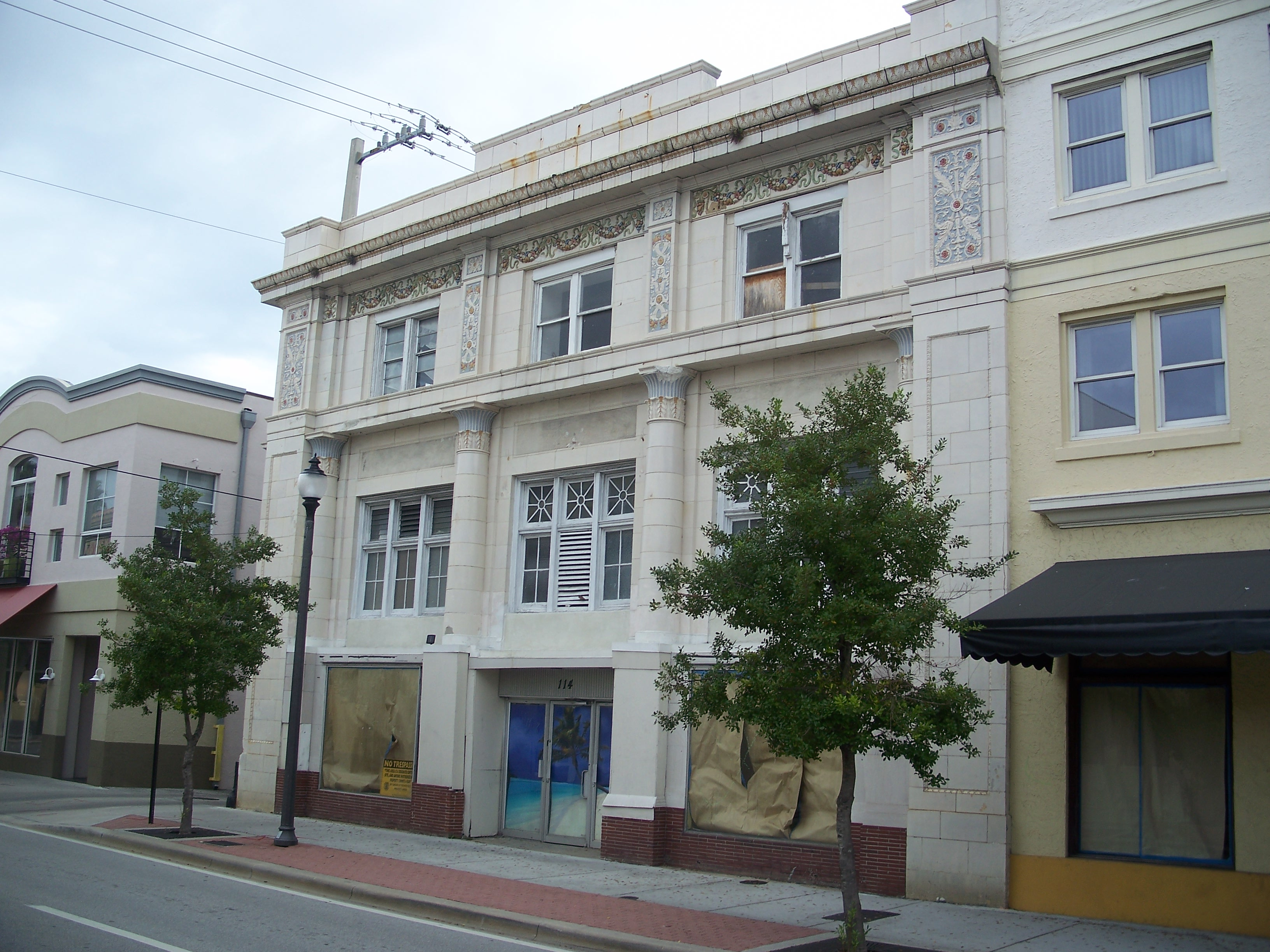
American National Bank Building, the first building designed by Harvey and Clarke

Henry Stephen Harvey, born in Winona, Mississippi, in 1889 and grew up in Birmingham, Alabama. He graduated from the University of Pennsylvania (UPenn) in 1914 with a B.S. in architecture. Later, he served in World War I in the Air Service branch as a second lieutenant of civil life- a position in which he planned and constructed aviation buildings at various aviation camps throughout the United States. Harvey remained in the Air Service for a few years after the war, until receiving an honorable discharge. By 1920, he had established an independent architectural firm in Palm Beach.

L. Philips Clarke, son of Louis Semple Clarke (1866-1957), was born in the North, in Pittsburgh, Pennsylvania, but visited Palm Beach frequently since infancy. In the 1880s, his father built a home in Palm Beach known as "Dulciora". Like Harvey, L. Philips Clarke graduated from UPenn and also served in World War I, enlisting in the Navy in 1917 as a chief machinist’s mate, where he worked on bomb diffusion machinery.

After the war, Clarke wanted to return to the Palm Beach area to establish an architectural firm, but lacked the experience to be eligible for a license. Harvey, intrigued by the possibility of an economic land boom, trained Clarke so he could pass the licensing examinations. In exchange, Clarke apparently financed the firm, providing between $1,000 and $2,000 for startup funds. Overall, Harvey and Clarke designed over 200 commercial and residential buildings between 1921 and 1929, including 50 train stations for the Seaboard Air Line Railroad. The firm estimated that between 1921 and 1925, they were responsible for $7 million in new construction in South Florida. Harvey served as a Mayor of West Palm Beach from 1924 to 1926. During the peak, at least 25 people were involved in the firm, including Gustav Maass. The firm offered small house plans to those unable to afford a personal architect.

Initially, the firm survived the collapse of the 1920s land boom, but began to fail during the onset of the Great Depression. In October 1928, the month after a devastating hurricane, Clarke became supervisor of plans for new hotels and residences. Harvey moved to Birmingham, Alabama, before returning to Florida in 1933 to work at a hardware store in Miami Beach. Clarke remained in the architectural industry, designing buildings such as a school auditorium in Belle Glade in 1932 and a new City Hall for West Palm Beach in 1947. Several of the firm's remaining structures were listed in the National Register of Historic Places or have otherwise been preserved. However, the Dixie Court Hotel was demolished in 1990 for construction of a new courthouse for Palm Beach County, while the Pennsylvania Hotel was demolished in 1995 and replaced with the McKeen Towers, a senior living facility.

== Selected works ==
Several of their works are listed on the U.S. National Register of Historic Places (NRHP). Works of Harvey and Clarke include:

- American National Bank Building, 114 South Olive Avenue, West Palm Beach, Florida, 1921

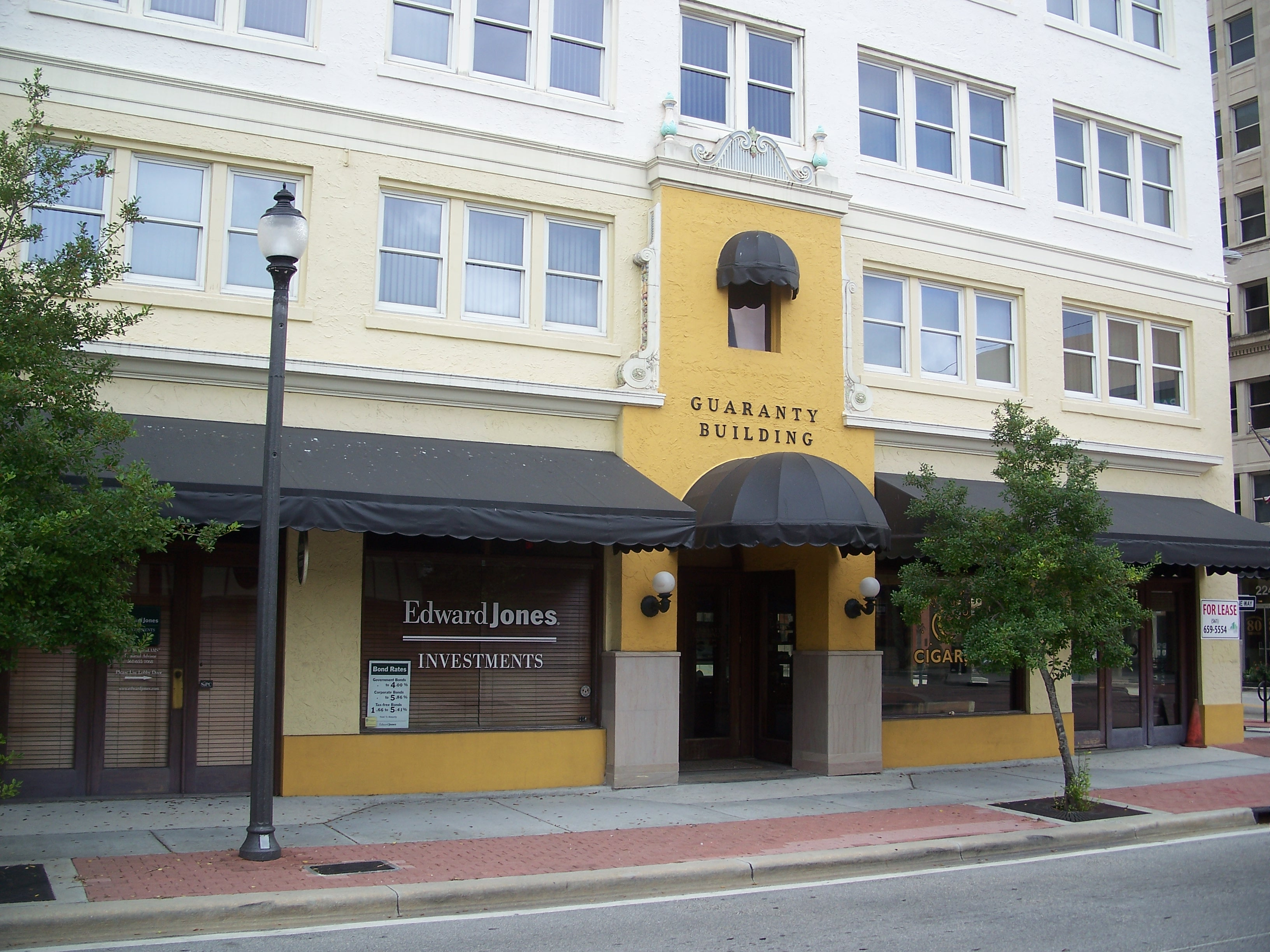
Guaranty Building, West Palm Beach

- Guaranty Building, 120 South Olive Avenue, West Palm Beach, Florida, 1922

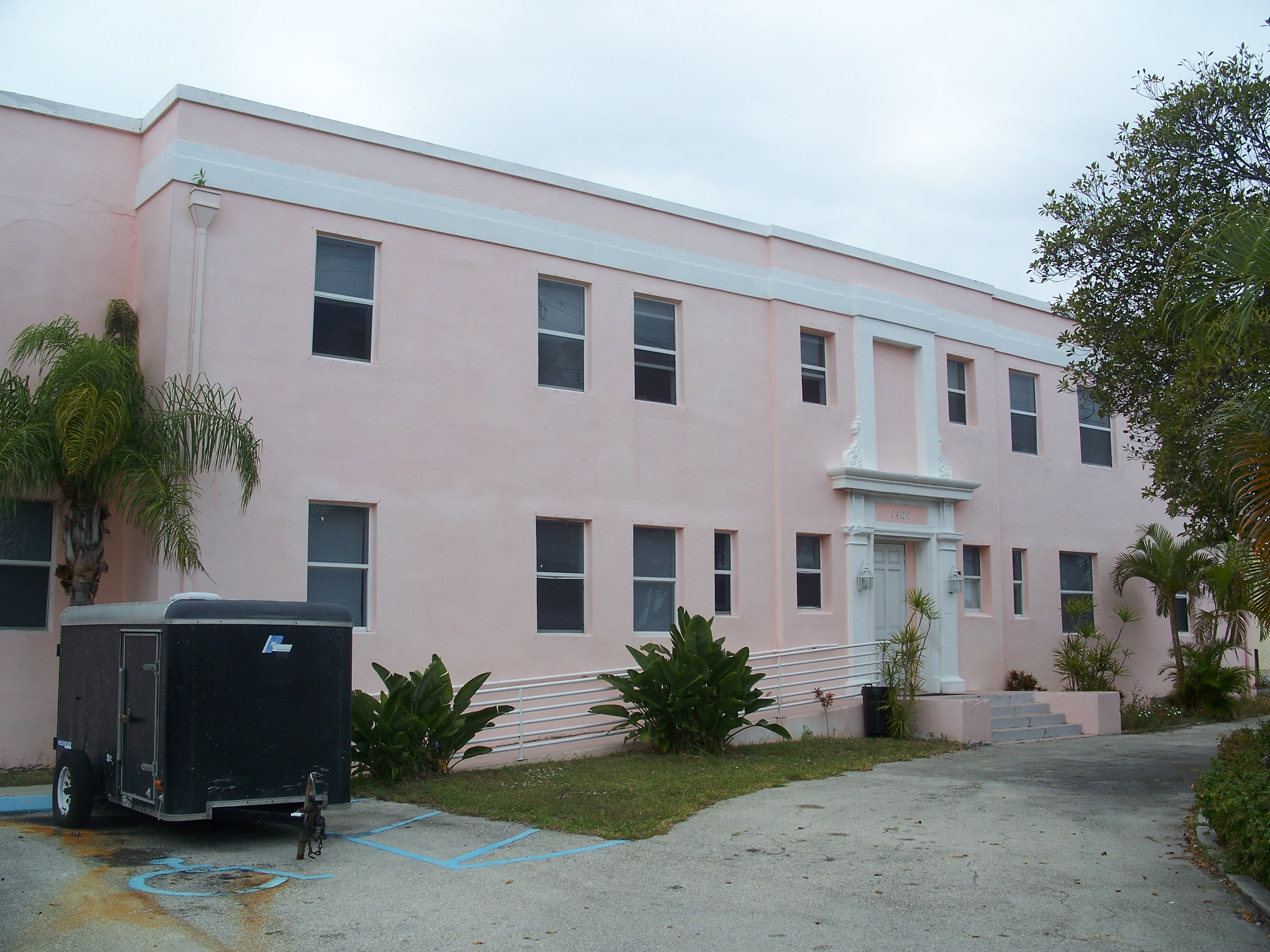
Pine Ridge Hospital

- Pine Ridge Hospital (1923), 1401 Division Ave., West Palm Beach, 1923. NRHP-listed.
- Holy Trinity Episcopal Church, West Palm Beach, Florida, 1924, L. Philips Clarke
- Palm Beach Town Hall, 360 South County Rd., Palm Beach, Florida, 1925, NRHP-listed
- West Palm Beach station, 201 South Tamarind Avenue, West Palm Beach, Florida, 1925
- Pennsylvania Hotel, Evernia Street and South Flagler Drive, West Palm Beach, Florida, 1925, demolished 1995
- Comeau Building, 319 Clematis St., West Palm Beach, Florida, 1926
- Dixie Court Hotel, 301 N. Dixie Highway, 1926, demolished in 1990, NRHP-listed
- Hialeah Seaboard Air Line Railway Station, 1200 Southeast 10th Court, Hialeah, Florida, 1926, NRHP-listed
- St. Patrick’s Episcopal Church, 418 North Sapodilla Avenue, West Palm Beach, 1929
- Alfred J. Comeau House, 701 Flamingo Dr., West Palm Beach, NRHP-listed

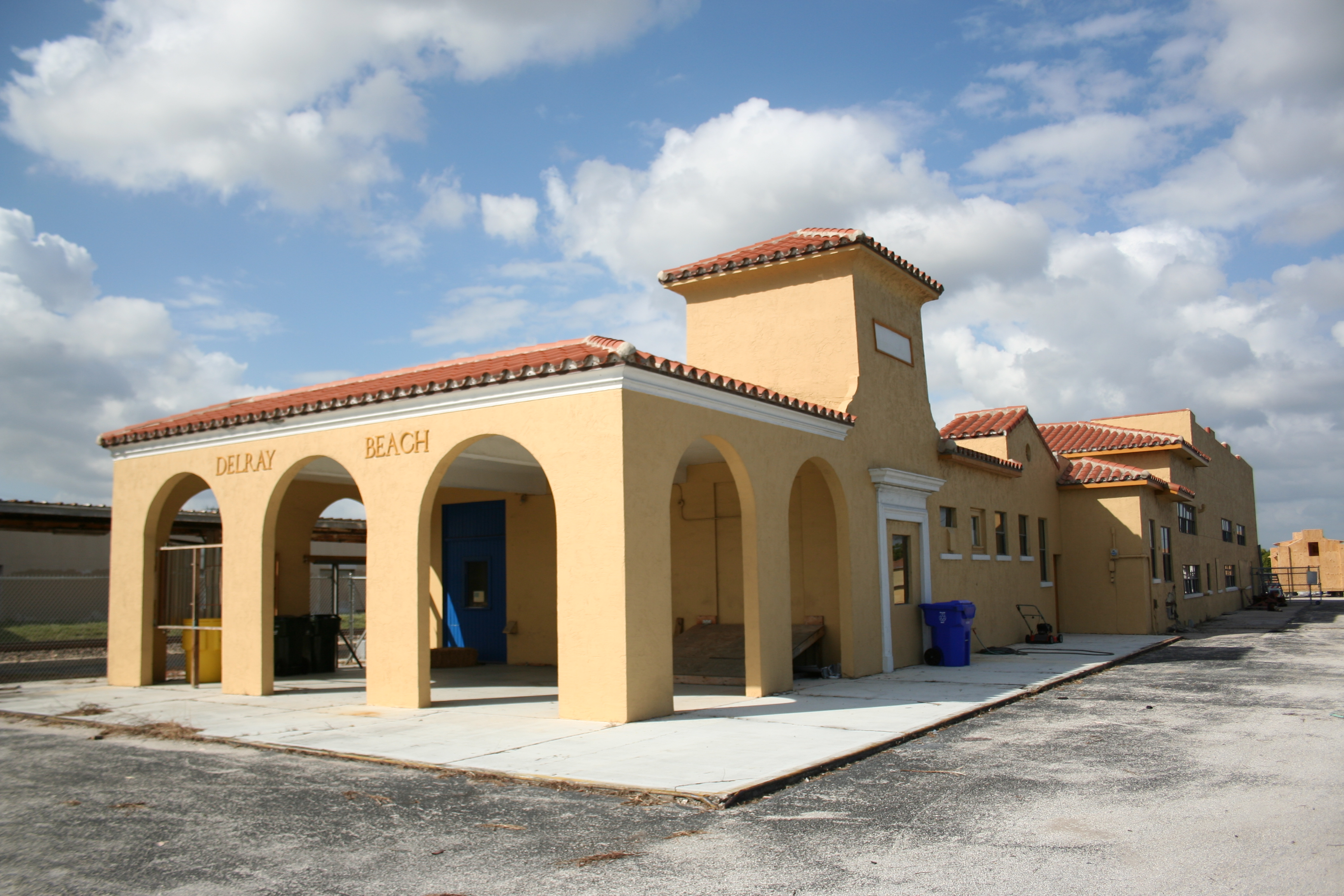
Seaboard Airline Railroad Station, Delray Beach

- Seaboard Airline Railroad Station, 1525 W. Atlantic Ave., Delray Beach, Florida, 1927, designed by Gustav Maass, NRHP-listed

== See also ==
- Henry Flagler
- Addison Mizner
