= Dixie Court Hotel =

- U.S. National Register of Historic Places
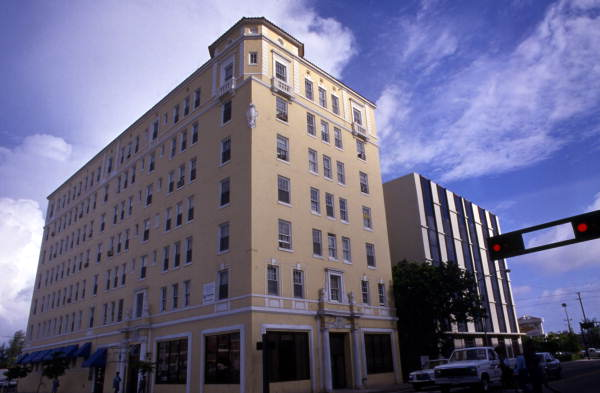
- Dixie Court Hotel, c. 1969

- Location within Florida Location within the United States
- Location: 301 N. Dixie Hwy., West Palm Beach, Florida
- Coordinates: 26°43′10″N 80°3′13″W
- Area: less than one acre
- Built: 1926
- Built by: Wilcox Bros.
- Architect: Harvey & Clarke
- Architectural style: Mediterranean Revival
- NRHP reference No.: 86001723
- Added to NRHP: August 21, 1986

The Dixie Court Hotel was a historic hotel in West Palm Beach, Florida, at 301 N. Dixie Highway. It was designed by Harvey & Clarke in the Mediterranean Revival-style of architecture and opened in 1926. A seven-story building with 132 rooms, the Dixie Court Hotel operated continuously until the Great Depression. Thereafter, the hotel closed and underwent several ownership changes, re-opening only briefly, such as during World War II. Ajit Asrani purchased the Dixie Court Hotel in 1976 and operated it until 1984, when he leased the ground floor to businesses.

On August 21, 1986, it was added to the U.S. National Register of Historic Places (NRHP). Despite this designation, the Dixie Court Hotel was destroyed in 1990 for the development of the Palm Beach County Courthouse complex. The hotel was removed from the NRHP on January 4, 2012.

== History and description ==
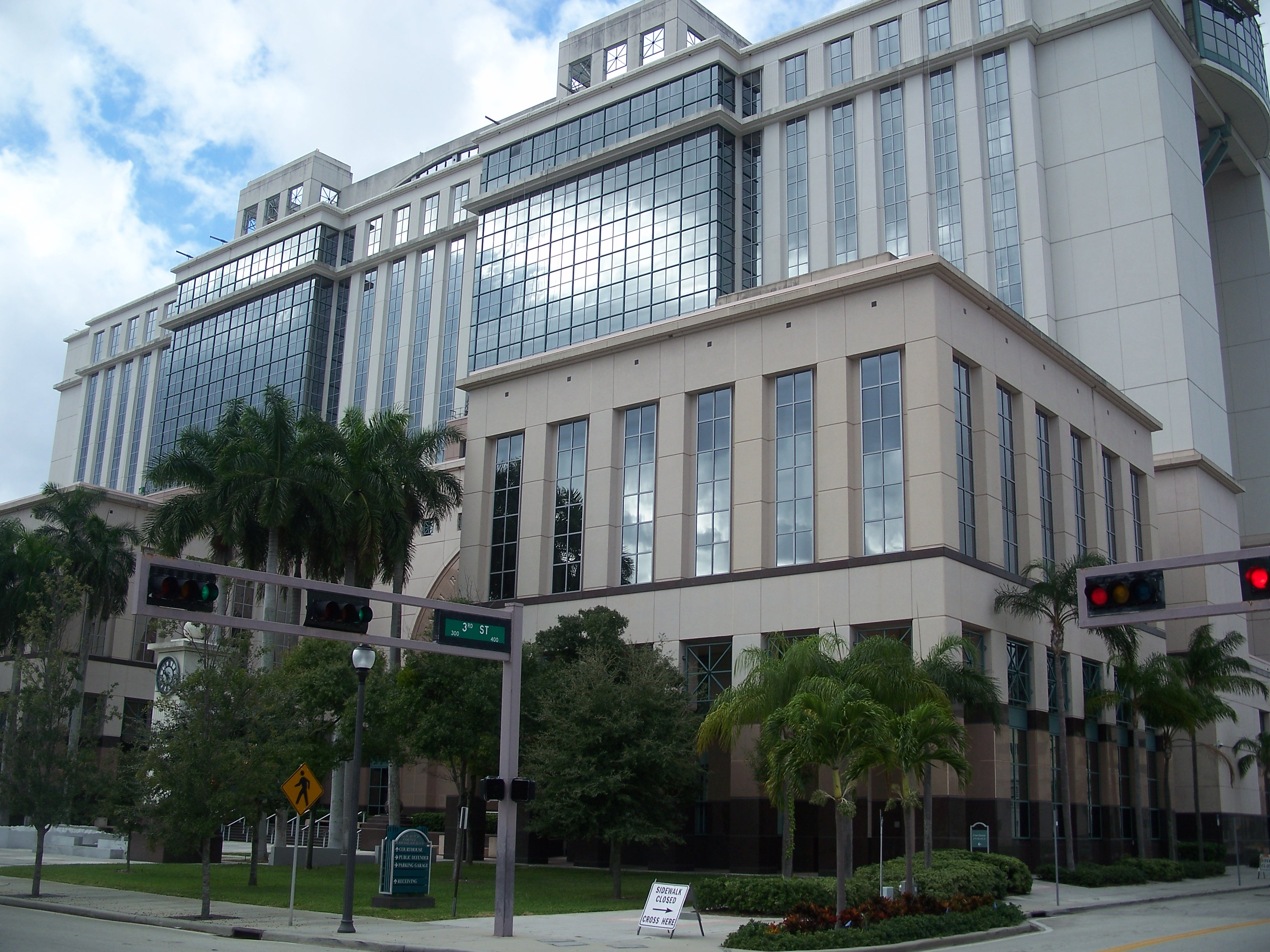
County courthouse, built on the site of the demolished hotel

Three residences formerly occupied the site that would later become the Dixie Court Hotel. John P. Johnson and Michael Zimny argued in the National Register of Historic Places (NRHP) registration form that "Althea Street (now Second Street) and Poinsetta Avenue (now Dixie Highway) was destined for commercial development because of its location directly west of Palm Beach County Courthouse in downtown West Palm Beach." Former West Palm Beach Mayor David F. Dunkle's Court Properties company developed the hotel, local architecture firm Harvey and Clarke designed the structure, and Wilcox Brothers, Inc. constructed it. The hotel was originally scheduled to open in December 1925, but construction was delayed for a few months due to a railroad embargo. Costs for building the structure totaled about $300,000.

A seven-story, Mediterranean Revival architecture-style building, the Dixie Court Hotel opened on April 25, 1926 at 301 North Dixie Highway. Local press described it as a "skyscraper". Around this time, two other hotels, El Verano and the Pennsylvania, also opened in West Palm Beach. The interior of the Dixie Court Hotel included a barber shop, dining room, pharmacy, and 132 guest rooms, each of which contained a bath. In the aftermath of the 1928 Okeechobee hurricane, the building was among others to house refugees. Financial issues as a result of the Great Depression caused the hotel to cease operating, and its ownership changed several times, from Dunkle to Florida-Collier Coast Hotels, Inc. in 1930, to the First National Bank of Jacksonville in 1936, to Jefferson Standard Life Insurance Company in 1943, and later to E. M. Schuman, his wife, and other individuals.

During World War II, the hotel briefly re-opened to accommodate trainees of the United States Army Corps of Engineers, who were stationed at Morrison Field (now known as the Palm Beach International Airport). Schuman then deeded the Dixie Court Hotel to Dixie Court, Inc. in 1950, who in turn sold the hotel to Ajit Asrani in January 1976. Until April 1984, Asrani operated a commercial hotel but then leased portions of the ground floor to attorneys' offices and a bank. The Dixie Court Hotel was listed on the NRHP on August 21, 1986.

Despite the hotel's NRHP designation, the City of West Palm Beach approved a plan in January 1988 to purchase the site. Thereafter, the City intended to transfer the land to Palm Beach County, who would then demolish the hotel and construct a new courthouse in its place. This occurred in 1990, with the hotel, a jail, and the Schooley Cadillac buildings torn down. Consequently, on January 4, 2012, the Dixie Court Hotel was removed from the NRHP.

== See also ==
- National Register of Historic Places listings in Palm Beach County, Florida
