= Good Samaritan Medical Center (West Palm Beach, Florida) =

Good Samaritan Medical Center (West Palm Beach)

Geography
- Location: West Palm Beach, Florida, Florida, United States
- Coordinates: 26°43′31″N 80°3′6″W

Services
- Emergency department: Yes
- Beds: 333

History
- Founded: 1920

Links
- Lists: Hospitals in Florida

Good Samaritan Medical Center or Good Samaritan Hospital is a 333-bed acute care hospital located in West Palm Beach, Florida.

== History ==
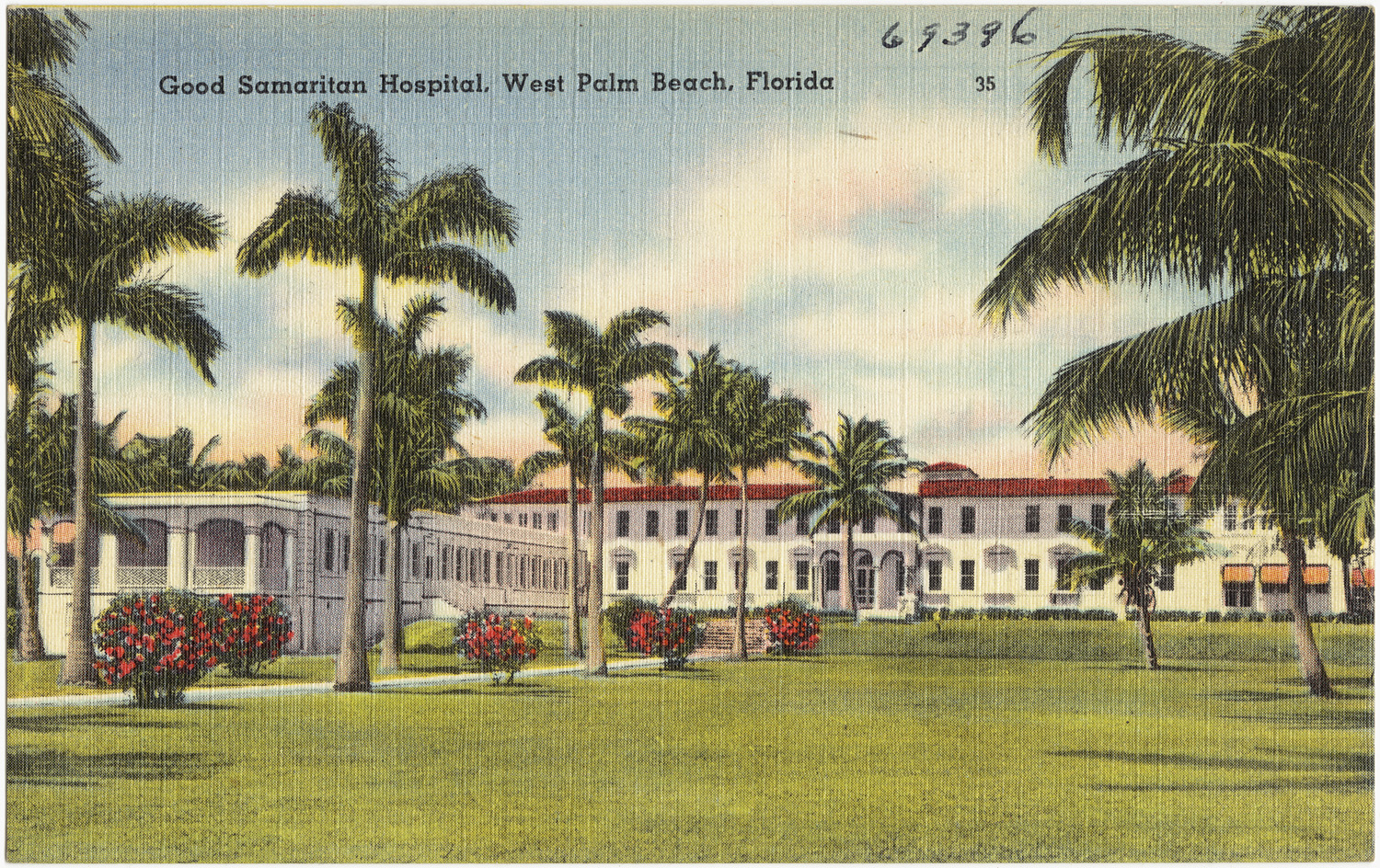
Postcard c. 1930-1945

The hospital opened in May 1920, replacing "Emergency Hospital" (which dated from about 1914), with 35 beds located on 12th street near the lakefront (now Palm Beach Lakes Boulevard) and Dixie Highway. Dr. William Ernest Van Landingham (1879-1973), a recent arrival and then secretary of the one-year-old Palm Beach County Medical Society, was a co-founder and the first administrator.

The Victor W. Farris Building was completed in 1988. Another building is called Flagler Waterway. A brick building next to Burger King has been abandoned.

In 2001, Tenet Healthcare acquired the hospital (along with St. Mary's Hospital, also located in the county).

In 2009, the Hospital celebrated its 90th anniversary.
