= Comeau Building =

- U.S. National Register of Historic Places
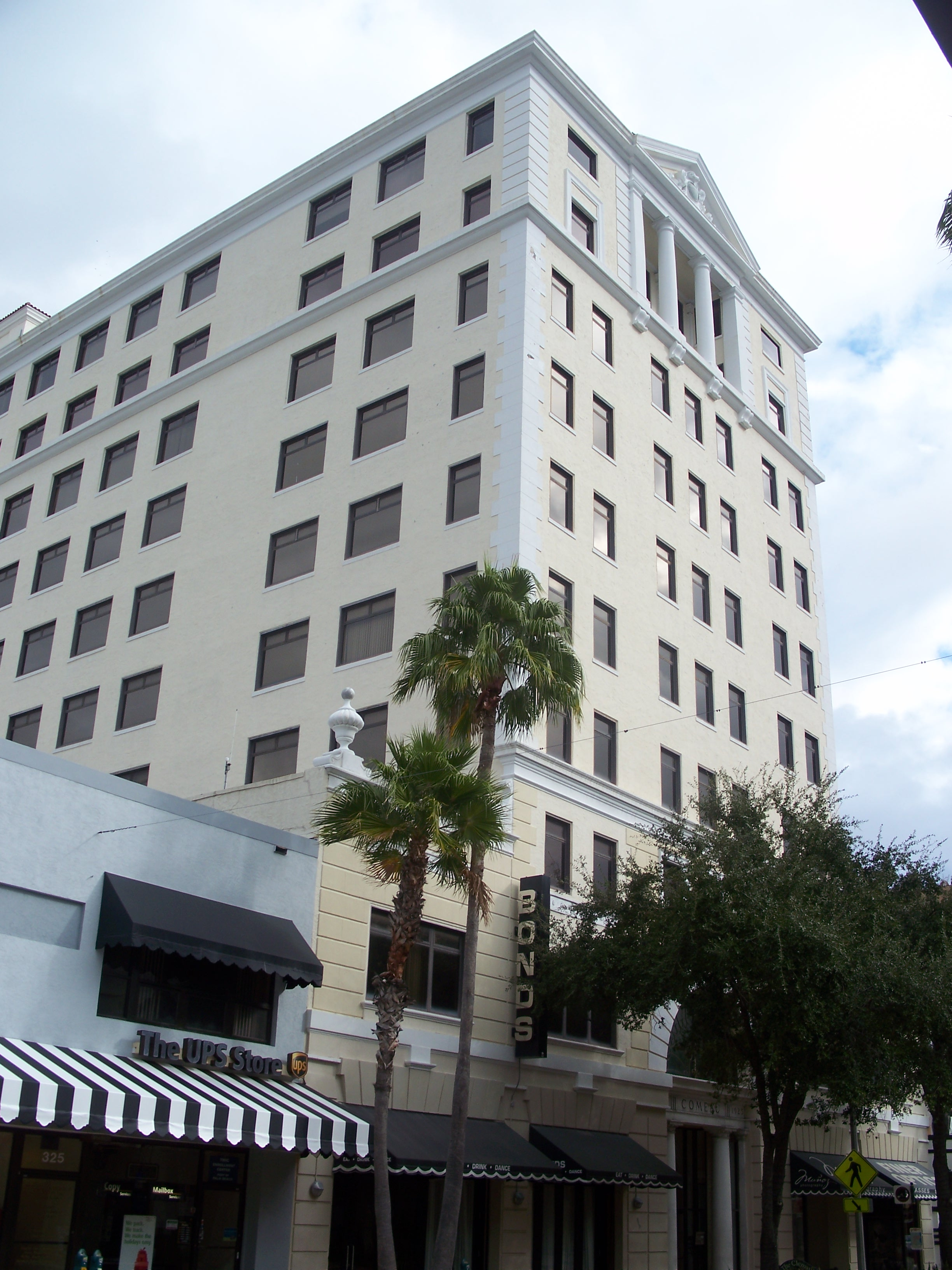

- Location within Florida Location within the United States
- Location: 319 Clematis St., West Palm Beach, Florida
- Coordinates: 26°42′48″N 80°3′9″W
- Area: less than 1 acre (0.40 ha)
- Built: 1926
- Architect: Henry Stephen Harvey and L. Phillips Clarke of Harvey & Clarke, West Palm Beach
- Architectural style: Neo-Classical Revival
- NRHP reference No.: 96000975
- Added to NRHP: September 06, 1996

The Comeau Building is a historic U.S. building in West Palm Beach, Florida. It is located at 319 Clematis Street. A 10-story Neo-Classical Revival-style structure, the building was conceptualized by businessman Alfred J. Comeau and designed by the local architectural firm Harvey and Clarke. After opening in 1926, the structure served as one of the most prestigious office buildings in downtown West Palm Beach for decades.

Comeau sold the building in 1932 due to struggling financially following the conclusion of the Florida land boom and the start of the Great Depression. On September 6, 1996, it was added to the U.S. National Register of Historic Places. In recent years, the structure sold for $5.1 million in 2006 and $12 million in 2015. In 2021, it sold along with three other nearby buildings for $54.2 million.

== History and description ==
Businessman Alfred J. Comeau is the namesake of the Comeau Building. An immigrant from Nova Scotia, Comeau attended Dartmouth College before moving to West Palm Beach, Florida, in 1911. After opening a general store, he operated two local restaurants, one on Clematis Street named "Comeau's Cafe" and the other in Palm Beach. He then ventured into the real estate business. In April 1925, The Palm Beach Post reported that Comeau was planning to construct a 10-story office building, expected to cost about $750,000. Ultimately, Comeau's Cafe at 317 Clematis Street was chosen as the location for this structure. He also owned a home in the Flamingo Park Historic Residential District, both listed on the National Register of Historic Places (NRHP) in 2000.

After Comeau obtained a building permit in June 1925, construction began, while local architectural firm Harvey and Clarke designing the structure. Construction costs ranged from $515,500 to $750,000 according to differing sources. The Neo-Classical Revival-style, 100,000 sq ft (9,300 m^{2}) building opened in 1926. According to Leslie Divoll and Sherry Piland of the Florida Bureau of Historic Preservation, the "Comeau Building became the prestige office building of the downtown business district, a reputation it did not relinquish until the first of the new glass towers was built in the early 1980s." The structure, located at 319 Clematis Street, also incorporated shopping arcade architecture, which was popular in Florida in the 1920s and 1930s, especially because air conditioning had not become common yet.

The 1928 Okeechobee hurricane substantially damaged the original roof tiles. Comeau then struggled financially after the 1920s Florida land boom ended and the Great Depression started. In 1932, he listed the Comeau Building for sale due to not being able to afford its mortgage. The structure was sold for $130,000, pending approval from a federal judge.

Between the 1970s and 1990s, the structure underwent some modifications. For instance, air conditioning was added in 1970, leading to glass replacing the open arcade entrance. That same year, some wooden walls and glass partitions were replaced with more fire-resistant materials, such as drywall and steel. The Roman faces or masks on each keystone were removed sometime around 1976. Then "cometic changes in 1985 restored the arcade fountain, put Mexican tile over the original marble flooring of the first floor, and added green awnings", according to Divoll and Piland. Any of the remaining original tilework or its replacement was again replaced in 1995. On September 6, 1996, the Comeau Building was added to the NRHP. It sold in 2006 for $5.1 million, and again in 2015 for $12 million. In 2021, it sold along with three other nearby buildings for $54.2 million.

== See also ==
- National Register of Historic Places listings in Palm Beach County, Florida
