= Guaranty Building (West Palm Beach, Florida) =

- U.S. National Register of Historic Places
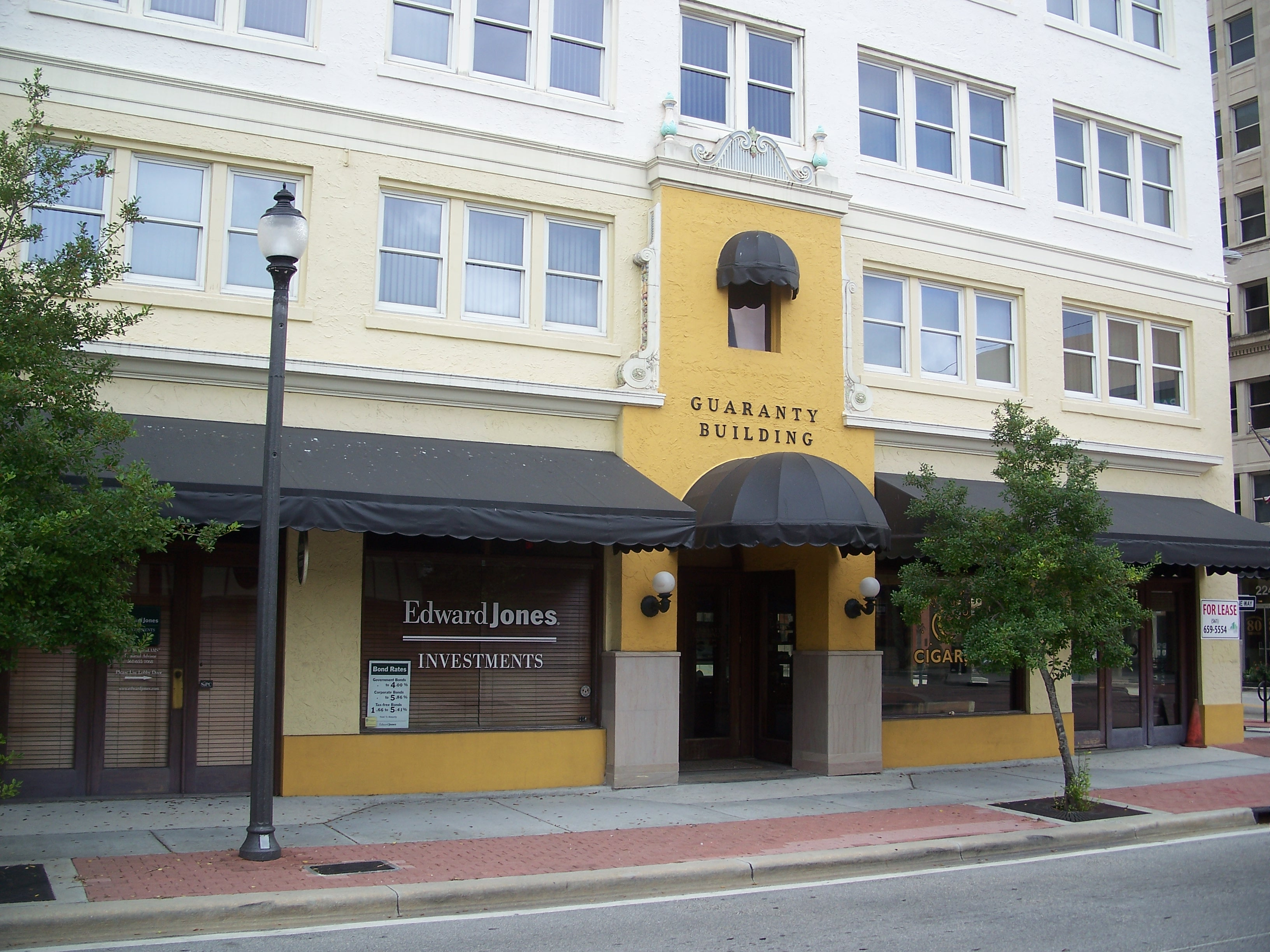

- Location within Florida Location within the United States
- Location: 120 S. Olive Ave., West Palm Beach, Florida
- Coordinates: 26°42′44″N 80°3′4″W
- Area: less than one acre
- Built: 1922
- Built by: Brown and Wilcox
- Architect: Henry Stephen Harvey
- Architectural style: Late 19th and Early 20th Century American Movement
- NRHP reference No.: 98001483
- Added to NRHP: December 10, 1998

The Guaranty Building is a historic site in West Palm Beach, Florida. Constructed in 1922, the structure was among the largest built in the city at the time, containing seven stories. It housed the Palm Beach Guaranty Company during the 1920s, owned by developer and former West Palm Beach Mayor David Forest "D.F." Dunkle. The structure, designed by Henry Stephen Harvey of Harvey and Clarke, is the commercial style of the Late 19th and Early 20th Century American Movement. It is located at 120 South Olive Avenue, the corner of Datura Street and S. Olive Avenue. On December 10, 1998, the Guaranty Building was listed on the National Register of Historic Places.

== History and description ==
Many businesses arrived in or were established in West Palm Beach during the 1920s Florida land boom. By the early part of that decade, developer and former West Palm Beach Mayor David Forest "D.F." Dunkle established the Palm Beach Guaranty Company. In March 1922, The Palm Beach Post reported that Dunkle and his company intended to construct a building, a seven-story structure at the corner of Datura Street and S. Olive Avenue. Local architect Henry Stephen Harvey of Harvey and Clarke designed the building, while the Brown and Wilcox Company erected it. In total, the structure cost approximately $200,000 to build.

The Guaranty Building opened sometime later in 1922 at 120 S. Olive Avenue, adjacent to the American National Bank Building. Paul L. Weaver and Barbara E. Mattick of the Florida Bureau of Historic Preservation declared the building significant because "it was the biggest real estate investment in the history of West Palm Beach" at the time of its construction. Architecturally, the structure is the commercial style of the Late 19th and Early 20th Century American Movement and contains multiple entrances on both elevations. Harvey and Clarke, who became tenants in the building during the 1920s, designed a four-story annex on the structure's north side.

Dunkle struggled significantly in financial terms after the Florida land boom collapsed and the Great Depression started. In addition to losing his home and most of his money and the Palm Beach Guaranty Company declaring bankruptcy in 1929, Dunkle was convicted of embezzling funds from the company. However, this conviction was later overturned. Other tenants occupied the building afterwards, including Prohibition agents. A series of remodels occurred from the 1950s to the 1970s. On December 10, 1998, the Guaranty Building was added to the National Register of Historic Places. Currently, the structure is known as the Historic Guaranty Building Office Condo and contains about 46,000 square feet (4,300 m^{2}) of space.

== See also ==
- National Register of Historic Places listings in Palm Beach County, Florida
