= Sarah Wilson =

Sari, Sara, or Sarah Wilson may refer to:

== Writers ==
- Lady Sarah Wilson (1865–1929), English war correspondent and aunt of Winston Churchill
- Sarah Ella Wilson (1874–1955), American educator; pioneering black schoolteacher in 1895
- Sarah Wilson (art historian), British art historian; works published since 1980
- Sarah L. Wilson (born 1959), American jurist and member of Columbia Human Rights Law Review
- Sarah Wilson (dog trainer) (born 1960), American author and dog trainer
- Sari Wilson, American writer and editor; Stegner Fellow 1997–99
- Sarah Wilson (journalist) (born 1974), Australian TV presenter

== Others ==
- Sarah Wilson (impostor) (1754–after 1780), English impostor of the non-existent sister of Queen Charlotte
- Sarah Maria Wilson (before 1756–1786), English actress; stage names Mrs. Weston and Mrs. Wilson
- Sarah Wilson (1922–1998), American winner of 10th Scripps National Spelling Bee
- Sara E. Wilson, American biomechanical engineer
- Sarah Kate Wilson, American electrical engineer

== Fictional characters ==
- Sara Wilson, in 2005 American film Cinderella Man
- Sarah Wilson, in 2017 American film Geostorm
