= Kate Wilson =

Kate Wilson may refer to:

- Kate Wilson (scientist), Australian scientist
- Kate Wilson (swimmer) (born 1998), Australian Paralympic swimmer
- Kate Wilson, the main character in Hydrophobia (video game)
- Kate Wilson-Smith (born 1979), badminton player

== See also ==
- Katherine Wilson (disambiguation)
- Katie Wilson, American politician and activist
- Sarah Kate Wilson, American electrical engineer
