= Brian Kilcommons =

American author and dog trainer (born 1953)

- Born: 1953 (age 71–72); Levittown, New York
- Occupation(s): Dog trainer, author
- Website: greatpets.com

Brian Kilcommons (born 1953) is an American author and dog trainer. He is a protégé of Barbara Woodhouse, and the only North American to have studied under Woodhouse in Great Britain. Kilcommons is the author of pet training manuals. In 1992, New York magazine described him as one of the most respected dog trainers in the US.

== Early life ==
Brian Kilcommons was born in 1953 in Levittown, New York. He enrolled in a pre-veterinary program at Iowa State University, but did not finish, due to a lack of finances. He opened a training and obedience school in 1977. He lives on a 124-acre (0.50 km^{2}) farm in Gardiner, New York. He is married to Sarah Wilson, who is also a trainer and the co-author of seven of his books.

== Career ==
=== Dog training ===
Kilcommons has trained the dogs of many celebrities and he has been described as the dog trainer to the stars by a Miami Herald reporter. He has trained over 35,000 dogs. Along with Sarah Wilson, he established the Family Dog Training and Behavior Center, which has been described as a "parallel universe for yuppies with four-legged children". Occupying an area of 1,200 sq. ft. the center includes facilities for puppy daycare, a puppy treadmill, puppy play groups and a puppy fashion boutique under the name of Bark Avenue.

=== Discipline ===
Kilcommons advises dog owners that saying "No" to a dog is useless. The reason for this advice is his belief that dogs simply do not understand the meaning of the word because it is too abstract for them. They are more likely to think that No is their name. Kilcommons explains that dogs are more likely to understand, and thus obey, commands connected with a specific action, such as "Off", "Sit", or "Stay". Such commands demand specific action from the dog and thus are more easily understood. When the puppy complies with the command, Kilcommons advises positive reinforcement in the form of praise and rewards.

Kilcommons believes that the dog should understand who the boss in the family is. He thinks that people nowadays invest a lot of energy and effort in their pets and many times neglect to discipline them properly. Undisciplined dogs can then exhibit domineering and disorderly behavior such as sitting on the couch and running outside the house without being properly prompted. He provides advice to families by observing their interaction with their canine companions and then analyzing the weak points. Proper training with basic commands such as the "Sit" command and behavioral cues such as ignoring the dog when he transgresses and sits on the couch have been credited with turning the behavior of an unruly dog around.

== Honors and awards ==
Brian Kilcommons has been awarded the Dr Steve Kritsick Memorial Award from the New York State Veterinary Medical Society for his impact on animals in the media. He has also been nominated twice for the Genesis Award.

== Television appearances ==
Kilcommons has appeared on 20/20, CBS This Morning, Good Morning America, QVC, HGTV, The Oprah Winfrey Show, A&E, The Today Show, ABC News, CNN (global), Prime Time Live, The Wall Street Journal Report, PBS's Gentle Doctor: Veterinary Medicine, and he hosted Fox News Channel's "Pet News". He has also served as the CBS Morning News Investigative Reporter and Animal Expert on WABC Eyewitness News, Channel 7. He toured several Petstock a pet supplies stores in Australia during 2012, conducting workshops with customer's dogs.

== Published works ==
=== Articles ===
Kilcommons has written articles for the following publications: Redbook, Town & Country, The Atlanta Journal-Constitution, People, Miami Herald, Toronto Star, The Boston Globe, USA Today, San Francisco Chronicle, Vancouver Sun, Time, The Philadelphia Inquirer, The New York Times, Newsday, St. Louis Post Dispatch, Los Angeles Times, Chicago Tribune, Glamour, Dogs in Canada, Mc Calls, Palm Beach Daily News, Dog World, Dog Fancy, Seventeen, InStyle Magazine, Women's Wear Daily. He has also been a contributor to Parade Magazine.

=== Books ===
- Your Dog: An Owner's Manual (1981)
- Good Owners, Great Dogs (1992) ISBN 0446516759
- Childproofing Your Dog (1994) ISBN 0446670162
- Good Owners, Great Cats (1995) ISBN 0446518077
- Mutts: America's Dogs (1996) ISBN 0446519499
- Tails From the Bark Side (1997) ISBN 0446521507
- Paws to Consider: The Complete Guide to Selecting A Breed (1999) ISBN 0446521515
- Metrodog: The Essential Guide To Raising Your Dog In The City (2001) ISBN 0446526037
- My Smart Puppy (2006) ISBN 044657886X
