= Palm Beach Daily News Building =

- U.S. National Register of Historic Places
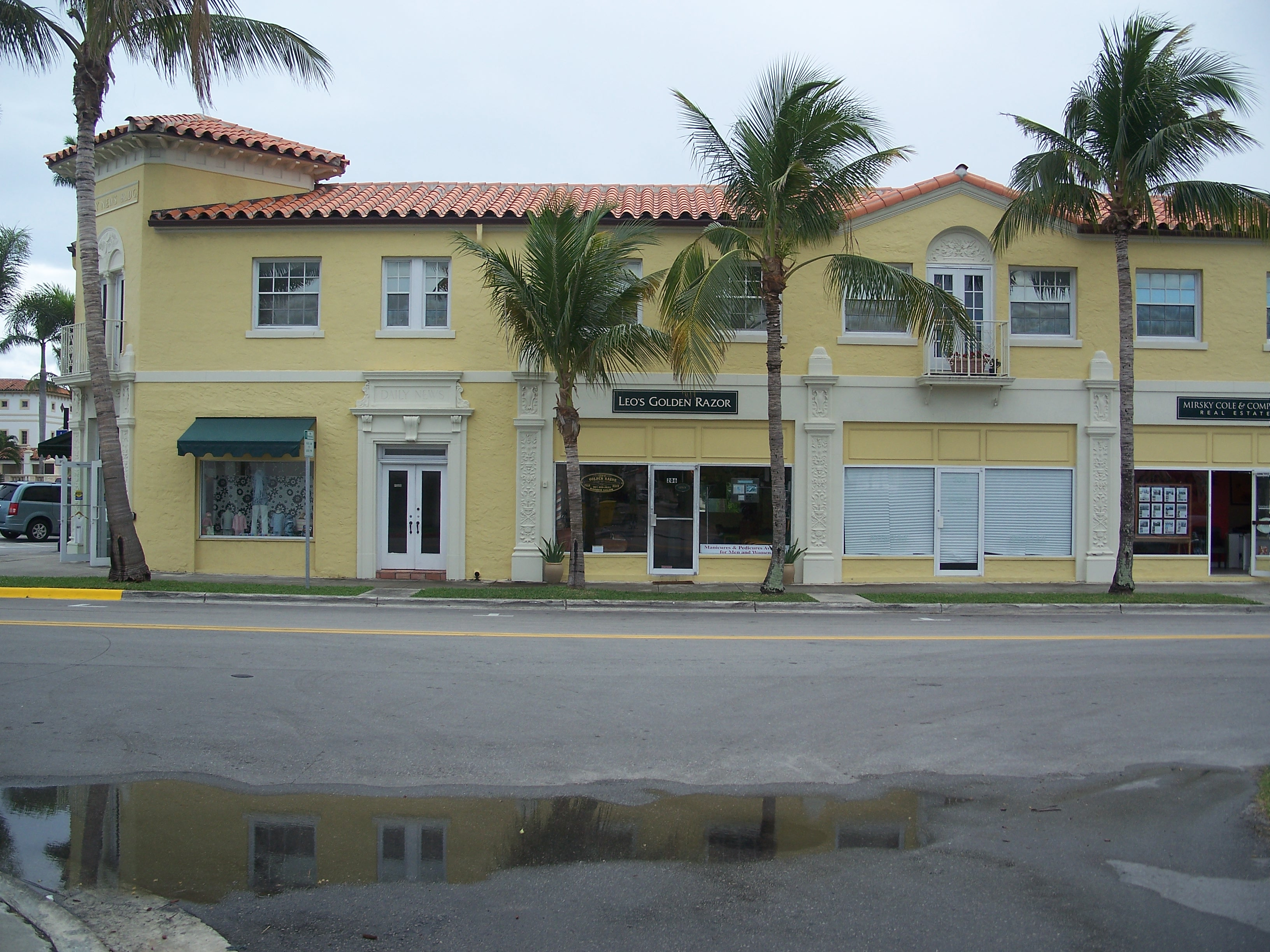

- Location within Florida Location within the United States
- Location: Palm Beach, Florida
- Coordinates: 26°42′13″N 80°2′13″W
- NRHP reference No.: 85003121
- Added to NRHP: December 24, 1985

The Palm Beach Daily News Building is a historic site in Palm Beach, Florida. It is located at 204 Brazilian Avenue. A two-story Mediterranean Revival style structure, the building served as the headquarters of the Palm Beach Daily News from 1925 to 1974 and, at times, produced other publications owned by the R. O. Davies Publishing Company. Previously, the newspaper operated in a much smaller building, 100 by 57 ft (30 by 17 m) on the same site. Designed by local architectural firm Harvey and Clarke and constructed at a cost of $85,000, the Palm Beach Daily News Building also previously featured one of the last projects completed by Addison Mizner.

Since the Palm Beach Daily News departed in 1974, the building has been occupied by offices and stores. On December 24, 1985, it was added to the U.S. National Register of Historic Places.

== History and description ==
The Palm Beach Daily News was founded in 1897 as the Lake Worth Daily News. Beginning in 1913, the newspaper operated out of a 100 by 57 feet (30 by 17 m) building, constructed by the R. O. Davies Publishing Company. However, the 1920s Florida land boom motivated the owners of the Palm Beach Daily News to erect a larger structure, especially if they intended to publish more real estate advertisements. Consequently, this building was demolished in the spring of 1925 and work quickly began on a new structure, designed by local architectural firm Harvey and Clarke. Construction costs approximately $85,000, money that had been loaned via the Palm Beach Guaranty Company.

On January 7, 1926, the Palm Beach Daily News Building opened, at 204 Brazilian Avenue. The Mediterranean Revival Style, two-story structure stretches 137 ft (42 m) along Brazilian Avenue and 75 ft (23 m) along South County Road (Florida State Road A1A). Additionally, Michael Zimny of Historic Property Associates described the exterior as featuring an "irregular rectangle with a northwest corner jog containing an entry tower. Stucco walls, cast-stone pilasters, ironwork, blind arches, and a barrel-tile roof add to its architectural unity and complement surrounding buildings."

An apartment for the family of Oscar Davies, the owner of the Palm Beach Daily News, was built in 1931 on the second floor and designed by Addison Mizner, although no evidence of this modification existed by the 1980s, other than in building plans. This was one of Mizner's last projects, as the collapse of the Florida land boom also led to a decline in the popularity of his architectural designs and commissions becoming more sporadic, while he died in 1933. At times, the building produced other publications such as the Palm Beach Daily Program, Palm Beach Life, and Palm Beach Weekly Magazine, each also owned by the R. O. Davies Publishing Company, while also housing offices for the Palm Beach Business Association and the Palm Beach Chamber of Commerce.

In 1974, the Palm Beach Daily News moved to another building at 265 Royal Poinciana Way and then to 400 Royal Palm Way in 2011. Meanwhile, Edward Stephenson purchased this building, before selling it to Averell Harriman Fisk and Mary A. Fisk. Averall Fisk is the grandson of W. Averell Harriman, a former New York governor and ambassador. Stores and offices have conducted business inside this building since then. The Palm Beach Daily News Building was added to the National Register of Historic Places on December 24, 1985. Since 2020, the Palm Beach Daily News has been published in the same building as The Palm Beach Post, at 2751 S. Dixie Highway in West Palm Beach.

== See also ==
- National Register of Historic Places listings in Palm Beach County, Florida
