= Vineta Hotel =

- U.S. National Register of Historic Places
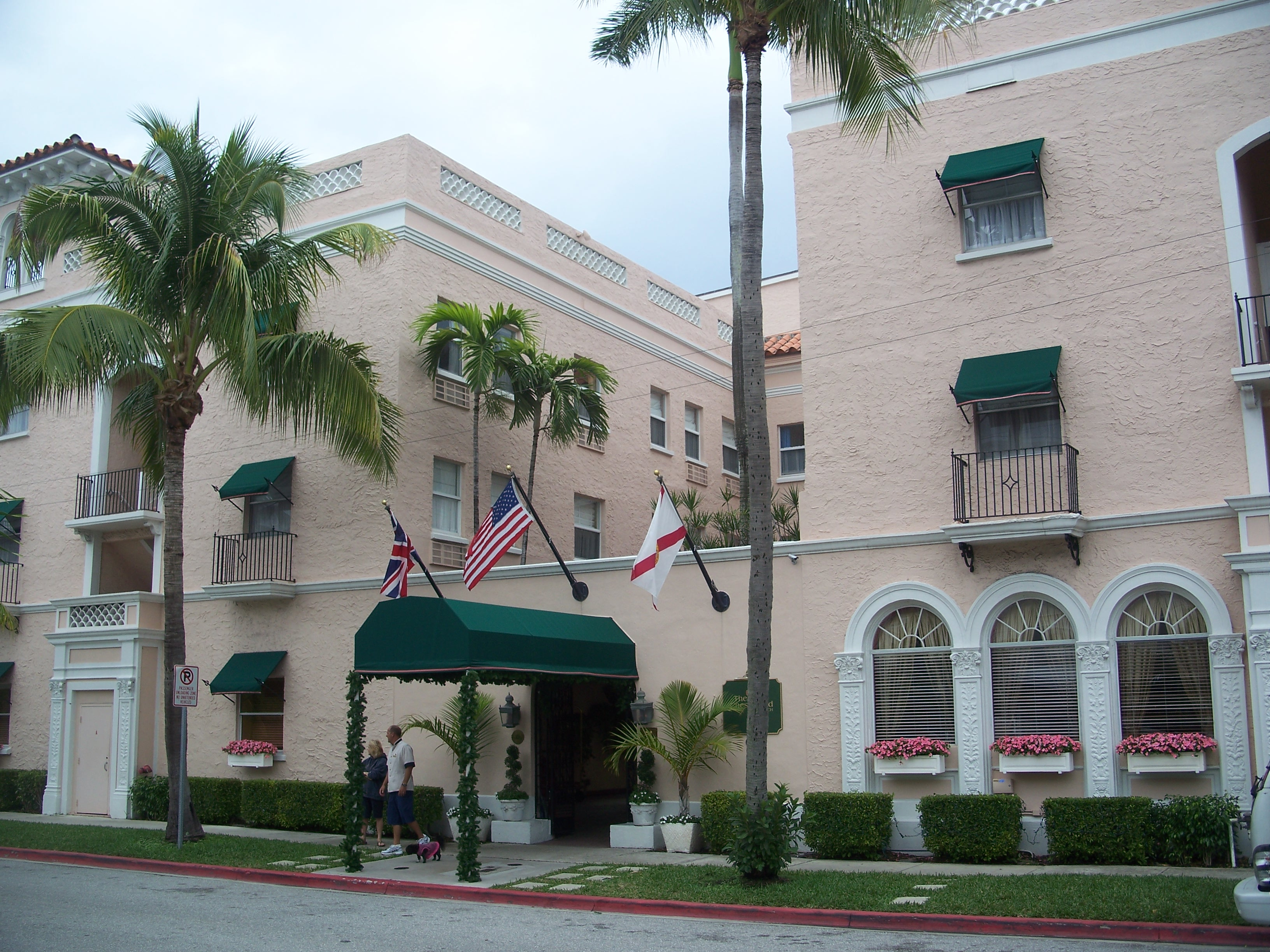

- Location within Florida Location within the United States
- Location: Palm Beach, Florida
- Coordinates: 26°42′10″N 80°2′28″W
- NRHP reference No.: 86001724
- Added to NRHP: August 21, 1986

The Vineta Hotel (originally the Lido Venice Hotel and Palm Court Hotel or the Chesterfield Hotel) is a historic hotel in Palm Beach, Florida. It is located at 363 Cocoanut Row. On August 21, 1986, the Vineta Hotel was added to the U.S. National Register of Historic Places. Opened in February 1926, the three-story hotel is of Mediterranean Revival-style structure. Several owners added improvements and renovated the structure, especially the interior.

Originally known as the Lido Venice Hotel, the property was renamed the Vineta Hotel in 1928, the Palm Court Hotel in the early 1980s, and the Chesterfield Hotel around 1989. In late 2022, the name was reverted to the Vineta Hotel by its current owners, the Rueben Brothers and Oetker Hotels. The hotel underwent an intensive three-year renovation before re-opening in February 2026.

== History and description ==
In January 1925, C. A. Estey purchased the land where the Vineta Hotel stands and then sold it to Herman Feldblat in August. On the same day that Feldblat bought the property, a building permit was issued. Feldblat then announced his intentions to build a structure similar to New York City's popular Lido Venice Hotel, albeit smaller. During that month, E. F. Munden received the contract from the town of Palm Beach to construct the hotel. Feldblat then sold the property to the Lido-Venice Corporation in November. On February 8, 1926, the Lido Venice Hotel opened to the public.

The Lido Venice Hotel, located at 363 Cocoanut Row, is a three-story, Mediterranean Revival-style structure. Although it opened to the public in February 1926, construction and some improvements continued throughout the year. In addition to lodging, the hotel also contained a supper club that featured live music from Paul Specht's orchestra. During the 1928-1929 winter season, the structure was renamed the Vineta Hotel. In the second half of the 1920s, the Florida land boom collapsed and then the Great Depression started. The Vineta Hotel was not exempt from suffering financially. Consequently, lawsuits were filed against the hotel's owner, resulting in the Central Farmers Trust Company acquiring the mortgage in 1929, and then an early 1934 judgment led to the building being sold via foreclose auction.

In March 1934, representatives of entrepreneur and inventor A. Atwater Kent purchased the Vineta Hotel for $48,000. Kent immediately spent $16,000 on improving the hotel and hiring a new manager. He sold the building in January 1944 for $95,000 to the 307-311 North Front Street Corporation. Michael Zimny of the Florida Bureau of Historic Preservation noted that "for the next two decades, the Vineta continued to function as one of Palm Beach's special small hotels, though the quality of service and physical condition of the building gradually declined."

Paul and Franciska Esterhazy from Budapest, Hungary, purchased the property in the mid-1970s. They worked on revitalizing the hotel and the quality of its services before selling the property in 1980 to Anna and Jeno Flohr, both also from Budapest. The Flohrs added a heated pool and a new air conditioning system and overhauled the lounge. A few years later, the Flohrs sold the hotel to the Palm Court, Inc., a private company that conducted more restoration work. Carl Sax and Lenny Horwitz spent about $7.5 million on improvements.

In December 1985, owners of the building, by this time known as the Palm Court Hotel, held a re-opening ceremony with Governor Bob Graham being among its attendees. According to the Miami Herald, "the interior, redesigned by Melanie Kahane, resembles an English country manor with light, airy colors and floral patterns combined with lots of wood and wicker." On August 21, 1986, the hotel was added to the National Register of Historic Places. About three years later, the property was purchased by the Tollman-Hundley Hotels company for approximately $4 million and renamed the building the Chesterfield Hotel, after their locations of the same name in Beverly Hills and London.

The Reuben Brothers purchased the Chesterfield Hotel in April 2022 for $42 million, while Oetker Hotels also acquired ownership sometime that year. By October, the name was reverted to the Vineta Hotel. They closed the hotel for renovations, which they initially expected to be finished with by late 2023. However, after an extensive, three-year renovation, the Vineta Hotel reopened in February 2026. The Palm Beach Daily News stated that renovation work "included façade and site improvements, infrastructure upgrades, and interior demolition and alterations. Guest rooms were enlarged on the second, third and fourth floors." The size of rooms at the Vineta Hotel ranges from 330 to 1,300 square feet (31 to 121 m^{2}).

== See also ==
- National Register of Historic Places listings in Palm Beach County, Florida
