= Palm Beach, Florida =

Town in Florida, United States

- Town
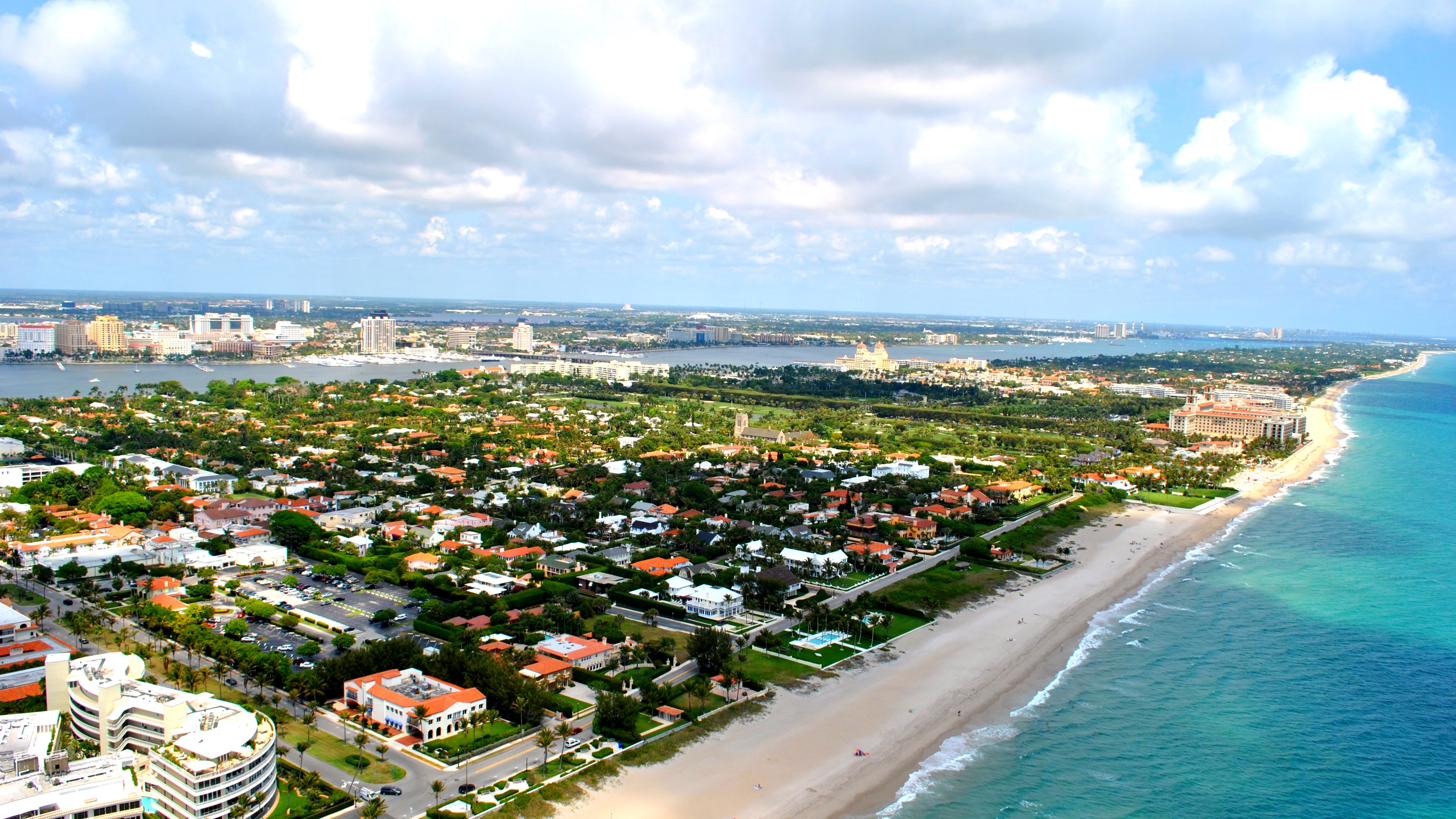
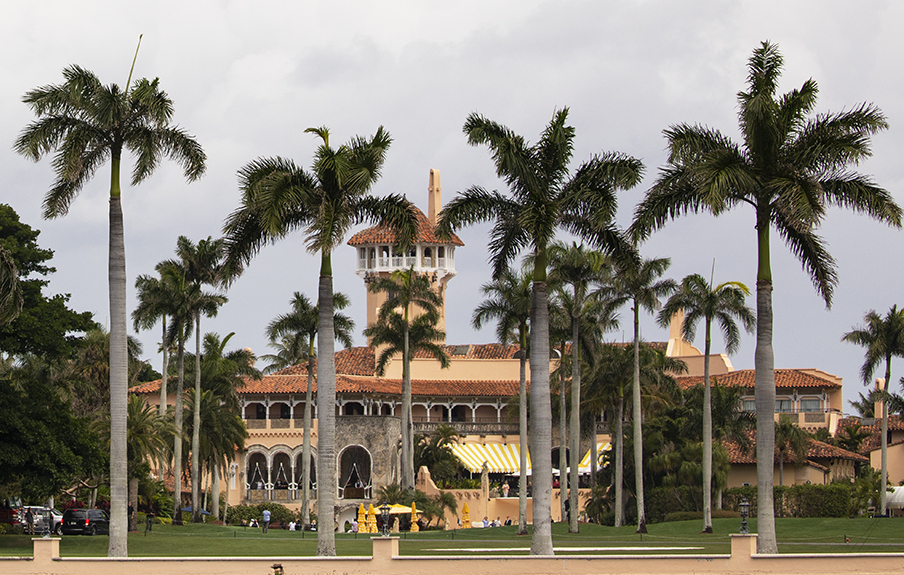
- Aerial view from the ocean Mar-a-Lago

- Flag Seal
- Interactive map of Palm Beach, Florida
- Location within Florida Location within the United States
- Coordinates: 26°42′20″N 80°02′28″W
- Country: United States
- State: Florida
- County: Palm Beach
- Settled (Lake Worth Settlement): c. 1872
- Settled (Palm Beach Settlement): January 9, 1878
- Incorporated (Town of Palm Beach): April 17, 1911

Government
  - Type: Council–manager
  - Mayor: Danielle H. Moore (R)
  - Council president: Margaret "Maggie" A. Zeidman
  - Commissioners: Julie Araskog, Lew Crampton, Ted Cooney, and President Pro Tem; Barbara "Bobbie" Lindsay
  - Town manager: Kirk Blouin
  - Town clerk: Kelly Churney

Area
  - Total: 7.80 sq mi (20.21 km^{2})
  - Land: 3.80 sq mi (9.84 km^{2})
  - Water: 4.00 sq mi (10.37 km^{2})
- Elevation: 0 ft (0 m)

Population (2020)
  - Total: 9,245
  - Estimate (2022): 9,235
  - Density: 2,430.8/sq mi (938.52/km^{2})
- Time zone: UTC-5 (Eastern (EST))
  - Summer (DST): UTC-4 (EDT)
- ZIP Code: 33480
- Area codes: 561, 728
- FIPS code: 12-54025
- GNIS feature ID: 2407067
- Website: townofpalmbeach.com

Palm Beach is an incorporated town in Palm Beach County, Florida, United States. Located on a barrier island, the town is separated from West Palm Beach and Lake Worth Beach by the Intracoastal Waterway to its west and a small section of the Intracoastal Waterway and South Palm Beach to its south. It is part of the Miami metropolitan area. As of the 2020 census, Palm Beach had a year-round population of 9,245.

White Americans began to live in the area as early as 1872. Elisha Newton "Cap" Dimick, later the town's first mayor, established Palm Beach's first hotel, the Cocoanut Grove House, in 1880, but Standard Oil tycoon Henry Flagler became instrumental in transforming the island's tropical landscape into a winter resort for the wealthy. Flagler and his workers constructed the Royal Poinciana Hotel in 1894, The Breakers in 1896, and Whitehall in 1902; extended the Florida East Coast Railway southward to the area by 1894; and developed a separate city to house the hotel workers and other laborers. This later became West Palm Beach. Addison Mizner also contributed significantly to the town's history, designing 67 structures between 1919 and 1924, including El Mirasol, the Everglades Club, La Querida, the William Gray Warden House, and Via Mizner, which is a section of Worth Avenue.

Forbes reported in 2017 that Palm Beach had at least 30 billionaires, with the town ranking as the 27th-wealthiest place in the United States in 2016, according to Bloomberg News. Many high-profile individuals have resided in the town, including United States presidents John F. Kennedy and Donald Trump. Palm Beach is known for upscale galleries and shopping districts, such as Worth Avenue, Royal Poinciana Plaza, and the Royal Poinciana Way Historic District.

== History ==
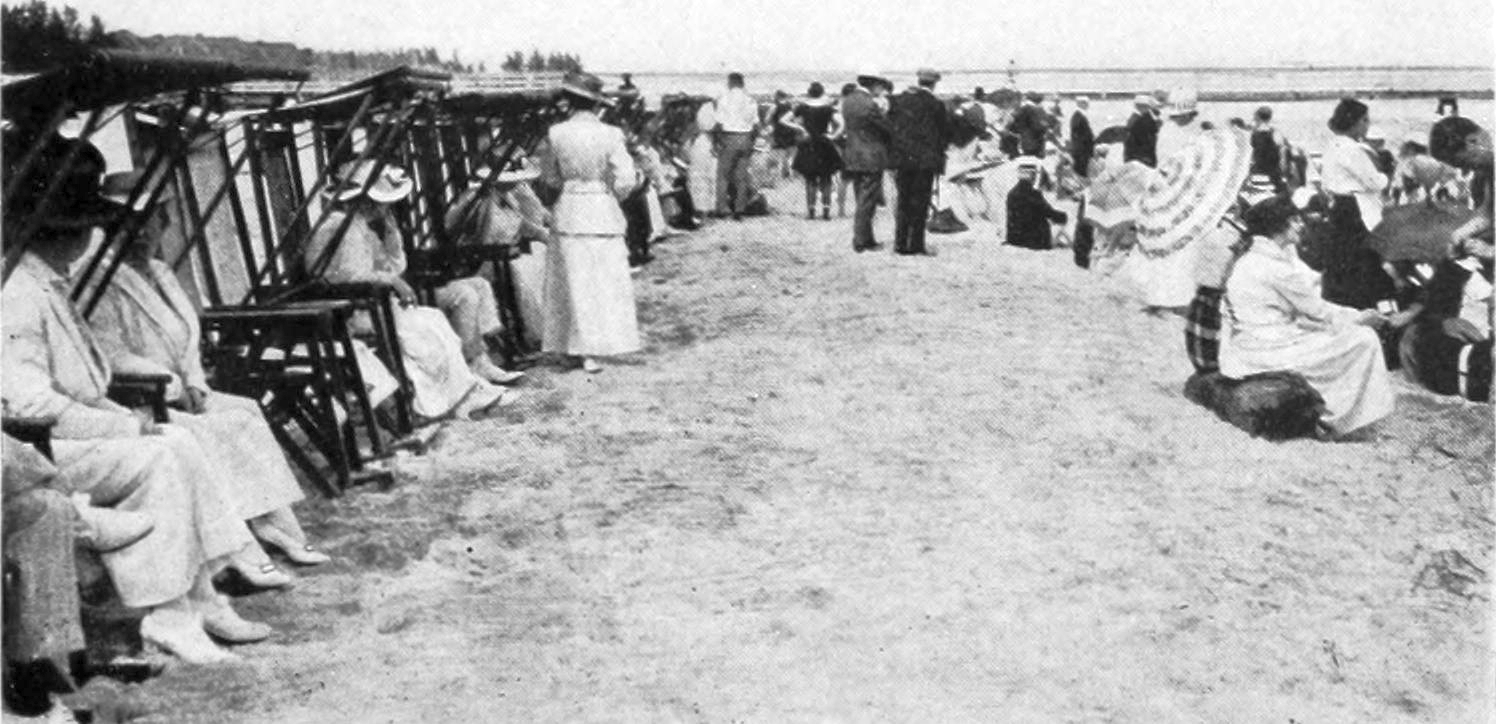
Palm Beach in 1916

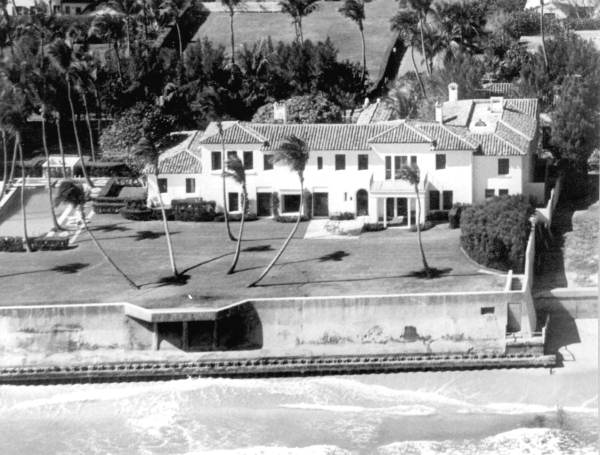
Aerial view of La Querida (c. 1965), the Winter White House of President John F. Kennedy

=== Native beginnings ===
Native Americans previously inhabited the island of Palm Beach, with the Jaega people arriving at least 3,000 years ago. Evidence for their inhabitation of the island are three pre-Columbian archaeological complexes. These complexes include a burial mound, six unmarked Native American cemeteries, and a more recent burial site, which suggests interaction between indigenous people and Europeans.

=== 1872–1900 ===
White settlers began arriving in modern-day Palm Beach by 1872. Hiram F. Hammon made the first homestead claim in 1873 along Lake Worth. At the time, the lake area had fewer than 12 people. By 1877, the Tustenegee Post Office was established in modern-day Palm Beach, becoming the lake area's first post office. Along the coast of Palm Beach, the Providencia wrecked in 1878 with a cargo of 20,000 coconuts, which were quickly planted. In 1880, Elisha Newton "Cap" Dimick converted his private residence to a hotel known as the Cocoanut Grove House. At the time of its opening, the Cocoanut Grove House was the only hotel along Florida's east coast between Titusville and Key West. A fire destroyed the hotel in October 1893. The Star Route, also known as the Barefoot Mailman route, began serving the area in 1885. Carriers delivered mail by foot or boat from Palm Beach and other nearby communities to as far south as Miami, a round trip of 136 miles (219 km). The first schoolhouse in southeast Florida (also known as the Little Red Schoolhouse) opened in Palm Beach in 1886.

Henry Flagler, a Standard Oil tycoon, made his first visit to Palm Beach in 1893, and described the area as a "veritable paradise". That same year, Flagler hired George W. Potter to plot 48 blocks for West Palm Beach, a city to house workers at his hotels, and construction began on the Royal Poinciana Hotel. The Royal Poinciana Hotel opened for business on February 11, 1894. Flagler, also the owner of the Florida East Coast Railway, extended the railroad southward to West Palm Beach by the following month. In 1896, Flagler opened a second hotel originally known as Wayside Inn, before being renamed Palm Beach Inn, and later becoming The Breakers. Fires later burned down the hotel in 1903 and 1925, but it was rebuilt each time. The Palm Beach Daily News began publication in 1897, originally under the name Daily Lake Worth News.

=== 1900–1940 ===
The first pedestrian bridge across the Intracoastal Waterway opened near the modern-day Flagler Bridge in 1901, replacing the original railroad spur. The beneficiaries of the Gilded Age bought Flagler's house lots. In 1902, Flagler himself built a Beaux-Arts mansion, Whitehall, designed by the New York-based firm Carrère and Hastings and helped establish the Palm Beach "winter season". Telephone service was established in Palm Beach in 1908, with 18 customers initially. Before the 1910s, many African Americans in the area lived in a segregated section of Palm Beach called the "Styx", with an estimated population of 2,000 at its peak. Between 1910 and 1912, though, African Americans were evicted from the Styx. Most of the displaced residents relocated to the northern West Palm Beach neighborhoods of Freshwater, Northwest, and Pleasant City.

In January 1911, it became known that West Palm Beach intended to annex the island of Palm Beach in the upcoming Florida legislative session. Residents objected and hired an attorney from Miami to become incorporated. Dimick, Louis Semple Clarke, and 31 other male property owners met at Clarke's house and signed a charter to officially incorporate the town of Palm Beach on April 17, 1911. Dimick became the first mayor, John McKenna became town clerk, and Joseph Borman became town marshal, while J. B. Donnelly, William Fremd, John Doe, Enoch Root, and J.J. Ryman served as the first council members. Also in 1911, Dimick built the Royal Park Bridge, with its first incarnation being a wooden structure. Passage from West Palm Beach to Palm Beach on the bridge originally required a toll – 25 cents per vehicle and 5 cents per pedestrian.

Between 1919 and 1924, American resort architect Addison Mizner designed 67 structures in Palm Beach. Some of Mizner's clients included Anthony Joseph Drexel Biddle Jr., Paul Moore Sr., Gurnee Munn, John Shaffer Phipps, Edward Shearson, Eva Stotesbury, Rodman Wanamaker, and Barclay Harding Warburton II. His designed works included the Costa Bella, El Mirasol, Everglades Club (in collaboration with Paris Singer), El Solano, La Bellucia, La Querida, Via Mizner, Villa Flora, and William Gray Warden House. Via Mizner was the first shopping complex along Worth Avenue, which was then a mostly residential street.

In February 1924, the town council allotted $100,000 to construct a new municipal building. Harvey and Clarke, an architectural firm, designed the building, while Newlon and Stephens built the structure after bidding $160,200 for the contract. The Palm Beach Town Hall opened on December 18, 1925, and is still used for town council meetings. Before its completion, the council meetings took place in a one-story wooden building on Royal Poinciana Way. Also in 1925, citywide construction revenue reached $14 million, attributed to the Florida land boom.

The 1928 Okeechobee hurricane made landfall in the town of Palm Beach, with sustained winds of 145 mph (235 km/h). High winds and storm surge damaged 610 businesses, 60 homes, and 10 hotels, as well as the Public Service Corporation and Ocean Boulevard. Damage in 1928 dollars totaled $10 million in Palm Beach.

=== 1940–1960 ===
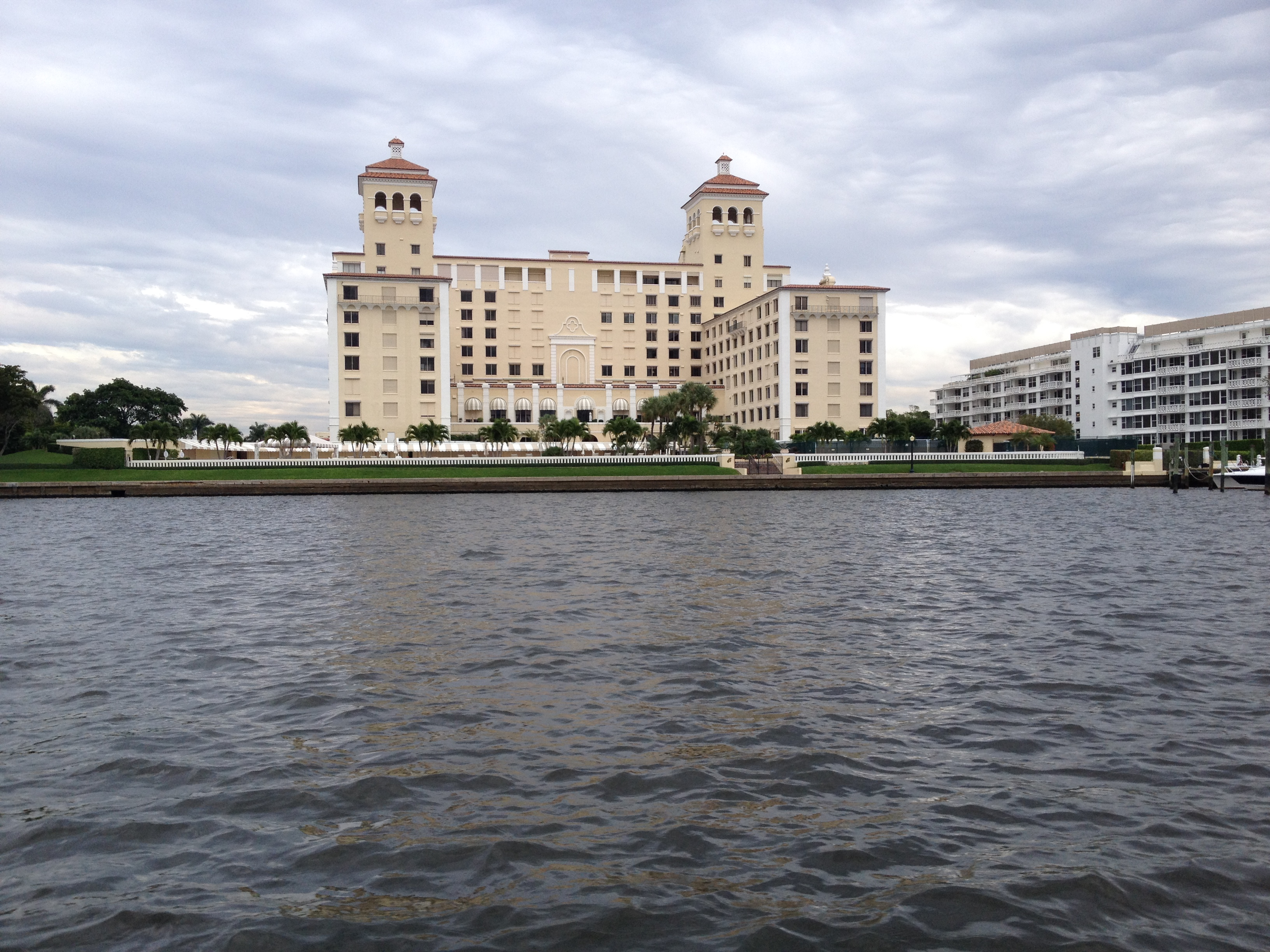
The Biltmore Hotel (now the Palm Beach Biltmore Condominiums), converted into a U.S. Naval Special Hospital and SPARS training school during World War II

Palm Beach's population grew from 1,707 in 1930 to 3,747 in 1940, a 119.5% increase. The Royal Poinciana Hotel, severely damaged in the 1928 hurricane, also suffered greatly during the Great Depression and was demolished in 1935. Around 4,000 people purchased the salvageable remains of the hotel. The Palm Beach-Post Times estimated some 500 homes could be built from the scraps of the hotel. Residents of Palm Beach established the Society of the Four Arts on January 14, 1936, with Hugh Dillman as the first president. The 1930s decade also saw the construction of the Flagler Memorial Bridge, the northernmost bridge linking Palm Beach and West Palm Beach, completed on July 1, 1938. Palm Beach mayor James M. Owens acted as master of ceremonies for the bridge's opening, while then–U.S. senator Charles O. Andrews and former U.S. senator Scott Loftin gave speeches during the event.

Early in World War II, the United States Army established a Ranger camp at the northern tip of the island, which could accommodate 200 men. The Palm Beach Civilian Defense Council ordered blackouts in Palm Beach beginning on April 11, 1942. Throughout the war, German U-boats sank 24 ships off Florida, with eight capsized off Palm Beach County between February and May 1942. The Army converted The Breakers into the Ream General Army Hospital, while the Navy converted the Palm Beach Biltmore Hotel into a U.S. Naval Special Hospital. The Biltmore Hotel would also become a training school for SPARS, the United States Coast Guard Women's Reserve.

On September 15, 1950, the Southern Boulevard Bridge opened, the third and southernmost bridge linking Palm Beach and West Palm Beach. Palm Beach residents elected Claude Dimick Reese (son of former mayor T.T. Reese and grandson of Dimick) as mayor in 1953. He became the only native-born mayor of Palm Beach in its history. In the 1950s, the town's population grew around 56%, from 3,866 in 1950 to 6,055 in 1960.

=== 1960–1990 ===
John F. Kennedy was elected President of the United States in 1960, and selected as his Winter White House La Querida, which his father bought in 1933. In December 1960, police in Palm Beach averted a retired postal worker's attempt to assassinate then president-elect Kennedy. The president also spent the last weekend of his life in Palm Beach, several days before his assassination in November 1963. Yvelyne "Deedy" Marix became the first woman elected to the town council in February 1970, and later became the first woman elected mayor of Palm Beach in 1983. Between 1971 and 1977, Earl E.T. Smith served as mayor of Palm Beach. He was previously an Ambassador of the United States to Cuba.

Preservationist Barbara Hoffstot published a book titled Landmark Architecture in Palm Beach in 1974. She personally photographed and summarized many older buildings in the town. The book also called for more awareness of and improvements to a system for protecting historic landmarks. The town council responded in 1979 by approving an ordinance establishing the Landmarks Preservation Commission, which identifies and works to protect historic structures.

General Foods and Post Cereals heiress Marjorie Merriweather Post bequeathed Mar-a-Lago to the United States upon her death in 1973, hoping it would be used as a Winter White House. The residence was returned to the Post family in 1981, before being purchased by Donald Trump in 1985 for roughly $10 million. He converted the estate into a club by 1995 and would later use Mar-a-Lago as a Winter White House during his presidency from 2017 to 2021, and again during his second term. A nor'easter in November 1984 caused the Mercedes I to crash into the seawall of Mollie Wilmot's estate. Wilmot's staff served the ten sailors sandwiches and freshly brewed coffee in her gazebo and offered martinis to journalists reporting on the incident.

=== 1990–2010 ===
On October 31, 1991, the Perfect Storm produced waves 20 feet (6.1 m) in height in Palm Beach. About 1,200 feet (370 m) of seawall at Worth Avenue was destroyed. At the same time, some parts of the town experienced coastal flooding, especially along Ocean Boulevard. By that afternoon, police allowed only residents to enter the town. The trial of William Kennedy Smith, a member of the Kennedy family, drew international media attention in 1991. Smith had been accused of committing rape at La Querida, but a trial at the Palm Beach County Court resulted in his acquittal on December 11, 1991. Another notable mayor, Paul Ilyinsky, son of Grand Duke Dmitri Pavlovich of Russia and heiress Audrey Emery, was elected to the office in February 1993. The town's population peaked at 10,468 people in the 2000 census. In March 2005, the Palm Beach Police Department – under the guidance of Police Chief Michael Reiter – began the first inquiry into the crimes committed by sex trafficker Jeffrey Epstein, leading to his arrest and indictment in July 2006. Despite an FBI investigation discovering at least 40 victims, the state attorney of Palm Beach County only charged Epstein with soliciting a prostitute and soliciting a minor for prostitution in June 2008. He pleaded guilty on both counts and received a controversial plea deal.

=== 2010–present ===
The town had a population of 8,348 people in 2010, a decrease of 20.3% from the previous census. Palm Beach celebrated its centennial on April 17, 2011. About 1,200 people attended a parade that began at the Flagler Museum (Whitehall). Between February and December 2015, the Town Square, which includes the Addison Mizner Memorial Fountain and the town hall, underwent a $5.7 million restoration. The fountain's restoration was named "project of the year" by the American Public Works Association's Florida chapter.

The FBI conducted a search warrant at Mar-a-Lago on August 8, 2022, approved by Magistrate Judge Bruce Reinhart after a criminal referral by the National Archives and Records Administration relating to classified documents. Although former president Donald Trump surrendered 235 classified documents by June 2022, the search at Mar-a-Lago yielded another 102 such documents. This discovery, along with allegations that Trump transported documents to his golf club in New Jersey and showed them to some guests there, led a grand jury at the United States District Court for the Southern District of Florida to indict him on 37 felony counts relating to the mishandling of classified documents on June 8, 2023.

=== Name ===
The January 1878 wreck of the Providencia is credited with giving Palm Beach its name. The Providencia was traveling from Havana to Cádiz, Spain, with a cargo of coconuts harvested in the Crown Colony of Trinidad and Tobago in the British West Indies, when the ship wrecked near Palm Beach. Many of the coconuts naturalized or were planted along the Palm Beach coast. A lush grove of palm trees soon grew on what was later named Palm Beach.

== Geography ==
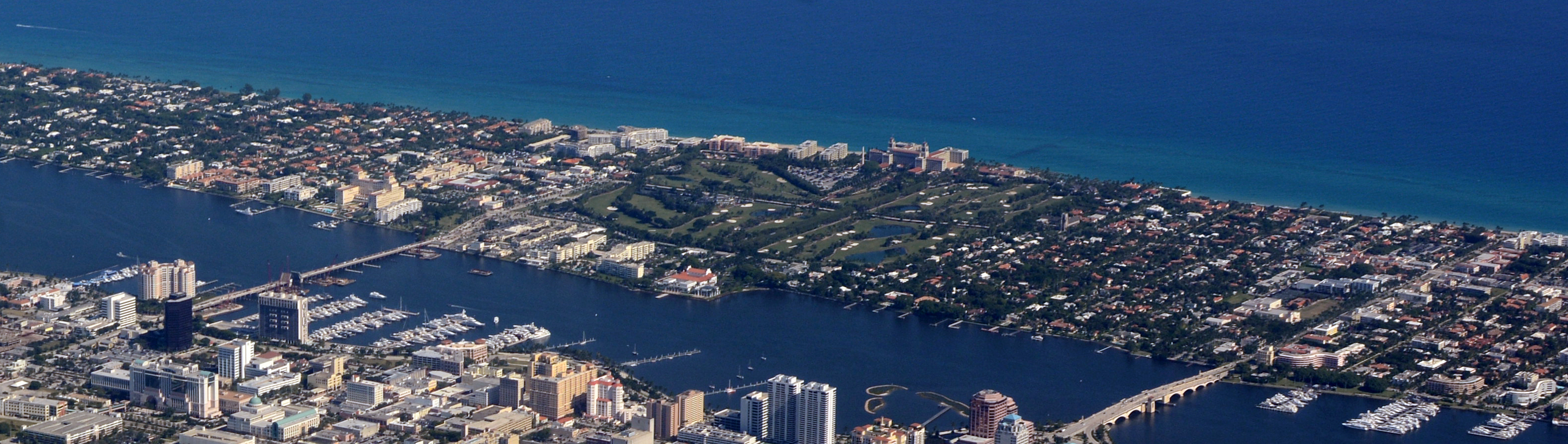
An aerial view of Palm Beach, looking northeast from downtown West Palm Beach in November 2014

Palm Beach is one of the easternmost towns in Florida, though the state's easternmost point is in Palm Beach Shores, just north of Lake Worth Inlet. The town is on an 18-mile (29 km) long barrier island between the Intracoastal Waterway (locally known as the Lake Worth Lagoon) on the west and the Atlantic Ocean on the east. At no point is the island wider than three-quarters of a mile (1.2 km), and in places it is only 500 feet (150 m) wide. The northern boundary of Palm Beach is the Lake Worth Inlet, though it adjoined with Singer Island until the permanent dredging of the inlet in 1918. To the south, a section of Lake Worth Beach occupies the island in the vicinity of State Road 802, though an exclave of Palm Beach extends farther southward until the northern limits of South Palm Beach. According to the U.S. Census Bureau, the town has an area of 8.12 mi^{2} (21.0 km^{2}), with land accounting for 4.20 mi^{2} (10.9 km^{2}) and water covering the remaining 3.92 mi^{2} (10.2 km^{2}). The average elevation of the town is 7 ft (2.1 m); the highest point is 30 ft (9.1 m) above sea level on the golf course at the Palm Beach Country Club.

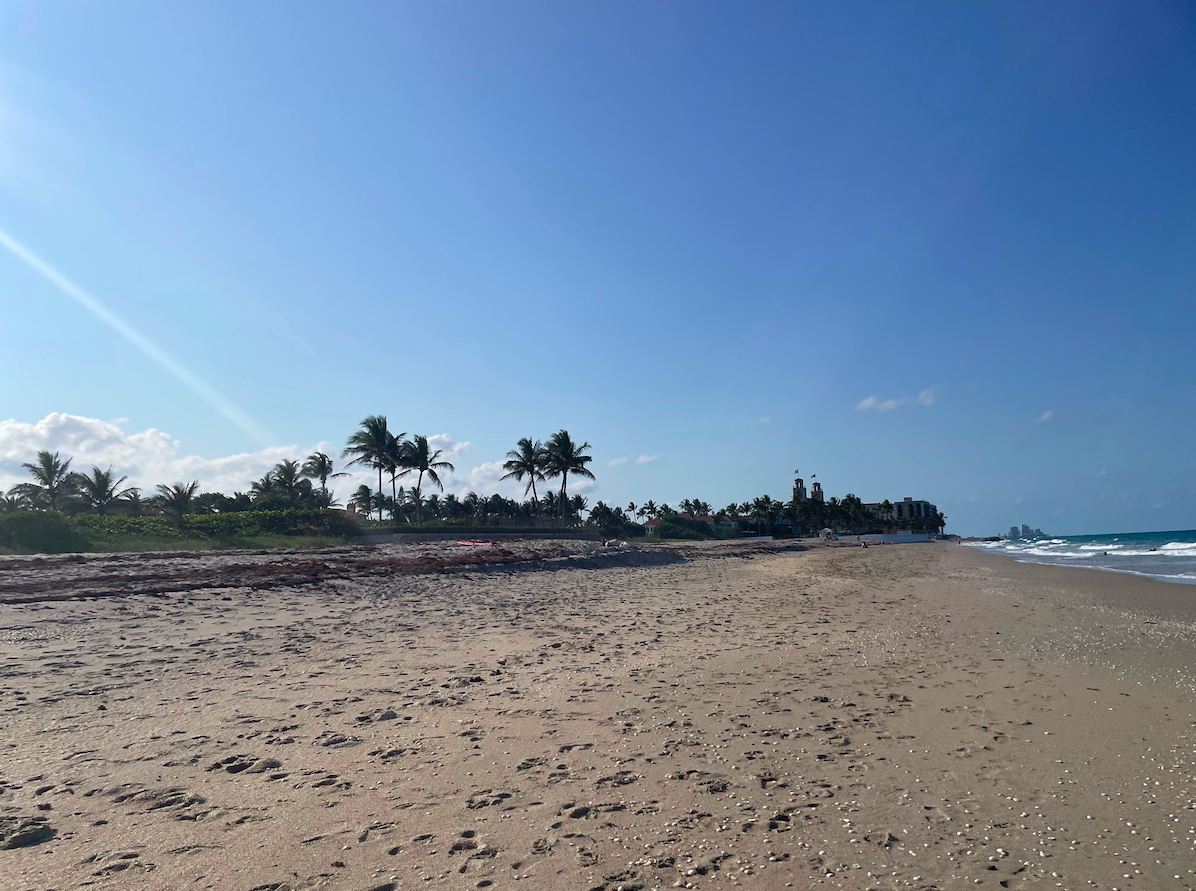
Clarke Avenue Beach in Palm Beach, Florida

Geologically, the island is a sand-covered ridge of coquina rock. Before settlement, the island was a pronounced coastal ridge bordering the Atlantic Ocean. The Intracoastal Waterway coast was primarily low-lying and swampy; marshy sloughs generally lay between the two features, though an oolitic limestone ridge stood along some parts of the island's westward side. Since 1883, the environment has been significantly altered by developing land, the filling of the sloughs, and a receding coastline due to erosion, but the Atlantic ridge is still the dominating topographical feature of the island and acts as a seaward barrier. The former slough areas are flood-prone.

The town and entire barrier island are within Evacuation Zone B, and evacuations are often ordered if a hurricane is forecast to impact the area, most recently in anticipation of Hurricane Dorian in 2019. Palm Beach town officials may deploy law enforcement officers to strategically place roadblocks to limit access to the island during unsafe conditions.

As of 2016, land use of the town is 60% residential, 13% rights-of-way, 10% private group uses, 3% recreational, 3% commercial, 2% public uses, 1% hotels (not including The Breakers), and less than 1% conservation, while The Breakers is a planned unit development accounting for 6% of land use. The remaining 2% of land was vacant. Palm Beach does not have any land dedicated to agricultural or industrial purposes. The town is essentially built out and cannot extend its boundaries.

Conservation is mainly confined to Bingham Island, Fishermen's Island, and Hunter's Island. Functioning as bird sanctuaries and rookeries, the islands are leased by the National Audubon Society, though state trustees of the Internal Improvement Fund and the Blossom Estate hold the titles to the islands. A part of Blossom Estate Subdivision just south of Southern Boulevard is also designated a conservation area.

=== Climate ===
According to the Köppen climate classification, Palm Beach has a tropical rainforest climate (Af) with hot, humid summers and warm, drier winters. The annual average precipitation is 62.3 in (1,580 mm), most of which occurs from May through October. In the wet summer season, short-lived heavy afternoon thunderstorms are common. Palm Beach reports more than 2,900 hours of sunshine annually. Although tropical cyclones can impact Palm Beach, strikes are rare, with the last direct hit in 1928.

The wet season is from May to October, when convective thunderstorms and downpours are common. Average high temperatures in Palm Beach are 83 to 91 °F (28 to 33 °C) with lows of 68 to 76 °F (20 to 24 °C), though low temperatures at or above 80 °F (27 °C) are not uncommon. During this period, more than half of the summer days bring occasional afternoon thunderstorms and seabreezes that somewhat cool the rest of the day. The dry season (winter) brings dryer, sunny, and much less humid weather. Between December and March, average high temperatures range from 74 to 82 °F (23 to 28 °C) and low temperatures average between 57 and 68 °F (14 and 20 °C). High temperatures occasionally drop below 70 °F (21 °C), while at other times highs occasionally reach 90 °F (32 °C) in mid-winter. The highest recorded temperature, 101 °F (38 °C), occurred on July 21, 1941, while the lowest observed temperature, 24 °F (−4 °C), occurred on December 29, 1894, during the Great Freeze. In some years, the dry season can become quite dry, and water restrictions are imposed.

Climate data for Palm Beach International Airport (West Palm Beach, Florida)
Month	Jan	Feb	Mar	Apr	May	Jun	Jul	Aug	Sep	Oct	Nov	Dec	Year
Record high °F (°C)	89 (32)	90 (32)	95 (35)	99 (37)	99 (37)	100 (38)	101 (38)	97 (36)	97 (36)	95 (35)	92 (33)	90 (32)	101 (38)
Mean daily maximum °F (°C)	75 (24)	77 (25)	79 (26)	82 (28)	86 (30)	88 (31)	90 (32)	90 (32)	88 (31)	85 (29)	80 (27)	76 (24)	83 (28)
Mean daily minimum °F (°C)	57 (14)	59 (15)	62 (17)	66 (19)	71 (22)	74 (23)	76 (24)	76 (24)	75 (24)	72 (22)	66 (19)	60 (16)	68 (20)
Record low °F (°C)	26 (−3)	27 (−3)	26 (−3)	38 (3)	45 (7)	60 (16)	64 (18)	65 (18)	61 (16)	46 (8)	36 (2)	24 (−4)	24 (−4)
Average precipitation inches (mm)	3.13 (80)	2.82 (72)	3.66 (93)	4.59 (117)	4.51 (115)	8.30 (211)	5.76 (146)	7.95 (202)	8.35 (212)	5.13 (130)	4.75 (121)	3.38 (86)	62.33 (1,585)
Source: National Weather Service

== Demographics ==
Historical population
Census	Pop.	Note	%±
1920	1,135		—
1930	1,707		50.4%
1940	3,747		119.5%
1950	3,886		3.7%
1960	6,055		55.8%
1970	9,086		50.1%
1980	9,729		7.1%
1990	9,814		0.9%
2000	10,468		6.7%
2010	8,348		−20.3%
2020	9,245		10.7%
2024 (est.)	9,493	▲	2.7%
U.S. Decennial Census; 1920–1970 1980 1990; 2000 2010 2020 2024

The town's population peaked at 10,468 people in the 2000 census but fell by 20.3% to 8,348 people in 2010. However, during the "winter season", defined as November through April, the population of Palm Beach swells to around 25,000. The town's affluence and its recreational facilities, shops, restaurants, social scene, and "community-oriented sensibility" were cited when it was selected in June 2003 as America's "Best Place to Live" by Robb Report magazine.

=== Racial and ethnic composition ===
Historical demographics	2020	2010	2000	1990	1980
White (non-Hispanic)	91.5%	94.0%	93.8%	96.4%	96.5%
Hispanic or Latino	4.6%	3.9%	2.6%	2.7%	2.5%
Black or African American (non-Hispanic)	0.5%	0.5%	2.5%	0.5%	0.7%
Asian (non-Hispanic)	1.5%	1.0%	0.5%	0.4%	0.4%
Native American (non-Hispanic)	0.0%	< 0.1%	< 0.1%	< 0.1%	0.4%
Some other race (non-Hispanic)	0.3%	0.1%	0.1%	< 0.1%	0.4%
Two or more races (non-Hispanic)	1.5%	0.3%	0.5%	N/A	N/A
Population	9,245	8,348	10,468	9,814	9,729

=== 2020 census ===
As of the 2020 census, Palm Beach had a population of 9,245. The median age was 68.3 years. 6.6% of residents were under the age of 18 and 56.8% of residents were 65 years of age or older. For every 100 females there were 84.0 males, and for every 100 females age 18 and over there were 84.1 males age 18 and over.

100.0% of residents lived in urban areas, while 0.0% lived in rural areas.

There were 9,256 housing units in Palm Beach, of which 5,051 were occupied and 4,205 were vacant. Of all occupied units, 6.7% had children under the age of 18 living in them, 48.1% were married-couple households, 15.6% were households with a male householder and no spouse or partner present, and 31.9% were households with a female householder and no spouse or partner present. About 40.1% of households were made up of individuals and 28.7% had someone living alone who was 65 years of age or older. The homeowner vacancy rate was 3.2% and the rental vacancy rate was 16.8%.

In the 2020 census, 92.6% of residents were White, 0.5% were Black or African American, 1.5% were Asian, 4.6% were of two or more races, and 4.6% were Hispanic or Latino of any race.

=== Demographic characteristics ===
Demographic characteristics	2020	2010	2000	1990	1980
Households	9,256	9,091	9,948	5,421	5,141
Persons per household	1.00	0.92	1.05	1.81	1.89
Sex Ratio	84.0	81.3	79.3	76.5	77.9
Ages 0–17	6.6%	6.9%	9.4%	6.7%	8.2%
Ages 18–64	36.6%	37.4%	38.0%	40.7%	45.3%
Ages 65 +	56.8%	55.8%	52.6%	52.6%	46.6%
Median age	68.3	67.4	66.6	66.2	63.2
Population	9,245	8,348	10,468	9,814	9,729

=== Income and poverty ===
Economic indicators
2017–21 American Community Survey	Palm Beach	Palm Beach County	Florida
Median income	$74,638	$36,431	$34,367
Median household income	$168,787	$68,874	$61,777
Poverty Rate	3.9%	11.6%	13.1%
High school diploma	97.9%	89.1%	89.0%
Bachelor's degree	68.6%	38.0%	31.5%
Advanced degree	35.0%	15.0%	11.7%

Palm Beach ranked as the 27th-wealthiest place in the United States in 2016 according to Bloomberg News. In the following year, Forbes reported the town had 30-plus billionaires.

=== Language and nativity ===
Language spoken at home (Note: Language spoken at home among residents at least five years old; only languages (or language groups) which at least 2% of residents have spoken at any time since 1980 are mentioned)	2015 (Note: Refers to 2013–2017 American Community Survey data; the last Decennial Census where language data was collected was in the 2000 census)	2010 (Note: Refers to 2008–2012 American Community Survey data; the last Decennial Census where language data was collected was in the 2000 census)	2000	1990	1980
English	89.2%	85.6%	84.0%	84.2%	86.9%
Spanish or Spanish Creole	3.7%	3.7%	3.8%	3.7%	3.5%
French or Haitian Creole	1.8%	4.7%	4.3%	N/A (Note: Not counted separately; aggregated into "Other" category)	2.7%
German	N/A	0.8%	2.3%	N/A	2.3%
Other Languages	5.3%	5.2%	5.6%	12.1%	4.7%

Nativity	2015 (Note: Refers to 2013–2017 American Community Survey data; the last Decennial Census where foreign-born population data was collected was in the 2000 census)	2010 (Note: Refers to 2008–2012 American Community Survey data; the last Decennial Census where foreign-born population data was collected was in the 2000 census)	2000	1990	1980
% population native-born	86.5%	83.1%	84.6%	86.3%	86.2%
... born in the United States	85.3%	81.2%	83.2%	N/A	85.8%
... born in Puerto Rico or Island Areas	0.7%	0.0%	0.1%	N/A	0.5%
... born to American parents abroad	0.5%	1.9%	1.3%	N/A	0.5%
% population foreign-born (Note: Only countries of birth which at least 7% of residents were born in at any time since 1980 are mentioned; no countries meet this criterion for the town of Palm Beach so none of them are mentioned)	13.5%	16.9%	15.4%	13.7%	13.8%
... born in other countries	10.8%	10.6%	10.7%	N/A	N/A

=== 2000 census ===
Palm Beach had the 40th-highest percentage of Russian residents in the United States in 2000, with 10.30% of the populace – tied with Pomona, New York, and the township of Lower Merion, Pennsylvania. It also had the 26th highest percentage of Austrian residents in the United States, at 2.10% of the town's population, tied with 19 other municipalities in the United States.

In 2000, the town's household income was $109,219. Males had a median income of $71,685 versus $42,875 for females; 5.3% of the population and 2.4% of families were below the poverty line. About 4.6% of those under the age of 18 and 2.9% of those 65 and older were living below the poverty line. Palm Beach had a median household income of $124,562 and a median family income of $137,867.

== Economy ==
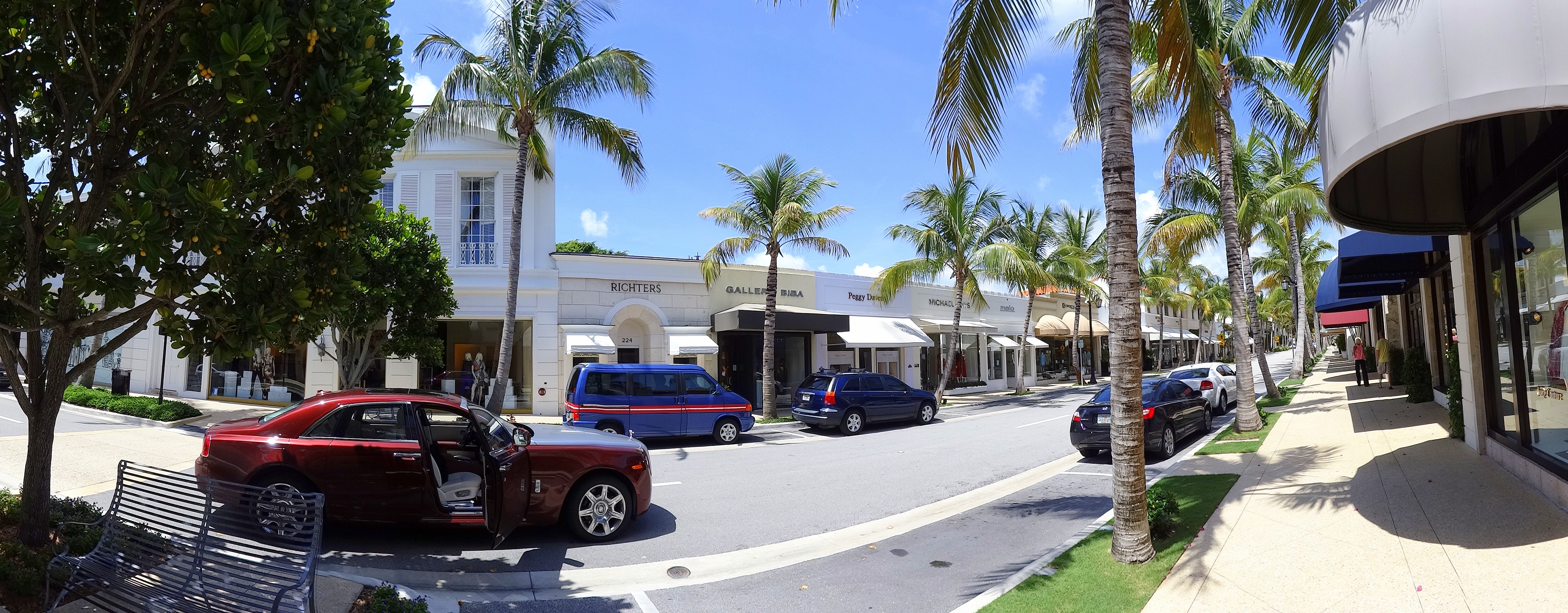
Worth Avenue

In 2018, the town of Palm Beach had an estimated labor force of 2,788 people. Palm Beach had an unemployment rate of just 2.3%, although 66% of the town's population was not in the labor force. The most common professions among the town's labor force are finance, insurance, real estate, rental, and leasing (24.1%); professional, scientific, management, administrative, and waste management services (23.6%); retail (12.2%); and educational services, health care, and social assistance (10.5%). However, as of 2017, only 4.1% of jobs in Palm Beach were held by residents of the town, with the most common other home destinations being West Palm Beach (15.4%), Palm Beach Gardens (3.9%), Lake Worth Beach (3.7%), Wellington (3.3%), and Greenacres (3.1%).

Tourism is a major industry in the town, bringing in around $5 billion in annual revenue. Palm Beach has several historical and luxurious hotels and lodgings, most notably The Brazilian Court, The Breakers, the Palm Beach Hotel (now the Palm Beach Hotel Condominium), the Tideline Ocean Resort & Spa, and the Vineta Hotel. The Breakers alone employs more than 2,200 people from around the world. The town of Palm Beach also contains Worth Avenue, an upscale shopping and dining district. Known for selling high-quality merchandise since the 1920s, Worth Avenue includes about 250 high-end shops, boutiques, restaurants, and art galleries. Other commercial districts of note include Royal Poinciana Plaza and Royal Poinciana Way Historic District, with the latter being listed on the National Register of Historic Places in 2015 due to its status as "the town's original Main Street", as noted by the Palm Beach Daily News.

== Arts and events ==
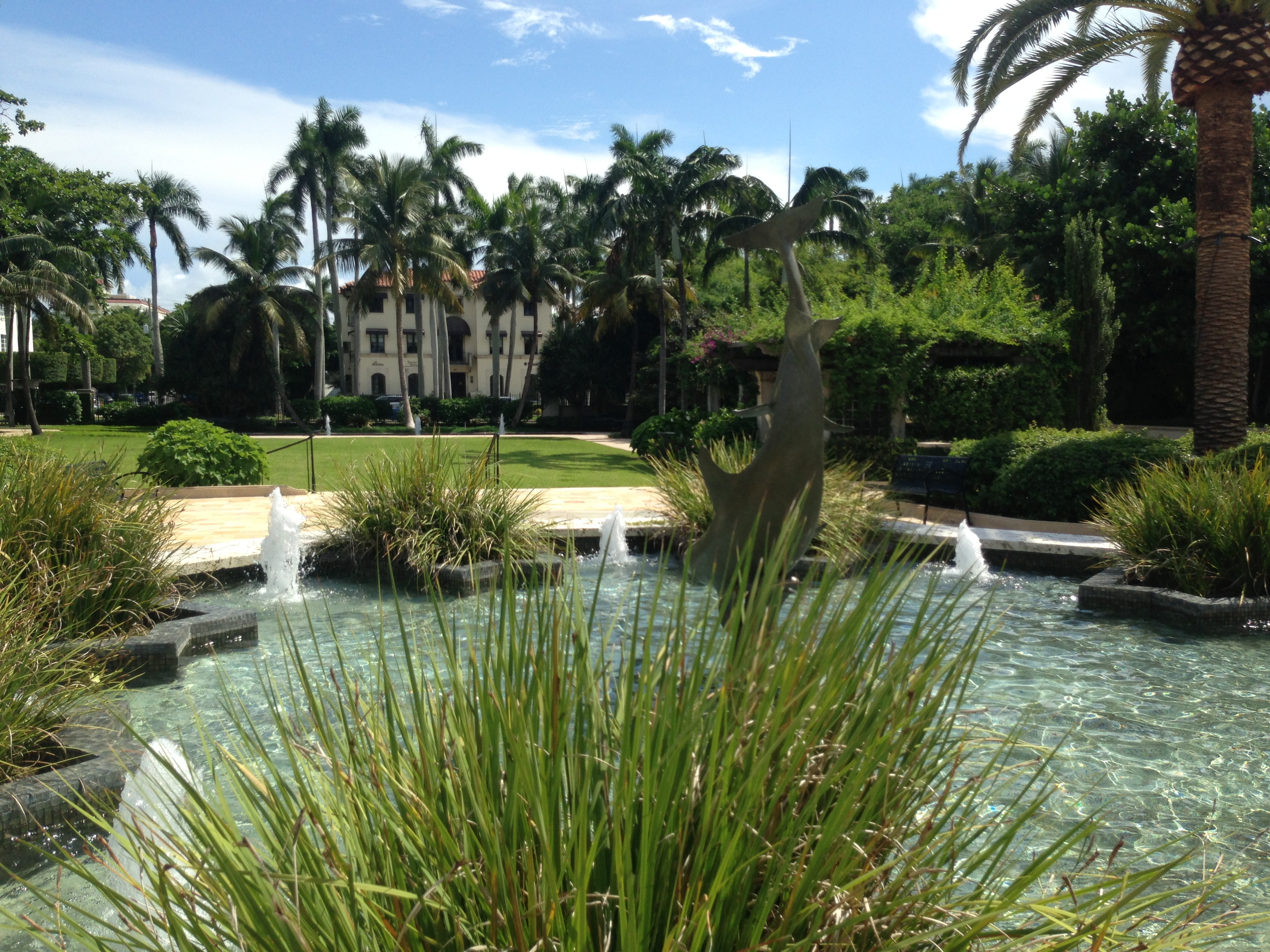
A botanical garden at the Society of the Four Arts

The Society of the Four Arts is a nonprofit charity organization established in 1936. Located on the north side of Royal Palm Way near the Royal Park Bridge, the Four Arts Plaza has an art gallery, a concert hall auditorium, two libraries, a botanical garden, and a sculpture garden. The two libraries serve as public libraries for the town of Palm Beach, one a children's library and the other a general public library. Officially named the Gioconda and Joseph King Library, the town's general public library has more than 70,000 items, including books, audiobooks, DVDs, and periodicals. The Dixon Education Building features art studio and classrooms, as well as an apartment for an artist visiting the Society of the Four Arts.

Royal Poinciana Playhouse, near Cocoanut Row and Royal Poinciana Way, formerly hosted ballets, Broadway plays, opera, and other cultural events. Although the venue has been closed since 2004, it remains structurally sound. Up Markets acquired control of the playhouse in 2014 via a long-term lease. In December 2022, extensive renovations began on the building's interior, which will have a capacity of about 400 people upon its expected completion in 2024.

Worth Avenue and its vicinity also has several art galleries, including DTR Modern Galleries, Evey Fine Art Gallery, Galeria of Sculpture, Gallerie Y, and the John H. Surovek Gallery. Additionally, the Norton Museum of Art and its sculpture gardens are just across the Intracoastal Waterway in West Palm Beach.

The Hope for Depression Research Foundation hosts an annual 5K run/walk known as the Race of Hope to Defeat Depression. In 2020, the event raised about $400,000 for depression research. The Palm Beach International Film Festival had been hosted in the town in the months of March and April since 1996. However, the festival has been on hiatus since 2018, following the resignation of CEO Jeff Davis. Various events are hosted on Worth Avenue, including historical walking tours held year-round. Once a year, the Palm Beach Charity Register magazine publishes a guide to charitable events held in the town and other nearby localities. The magazine promoted 186 charity galas, luncheons, and parties scheduled between the fall of 2019 and summer of 2020.

== Attractions ==
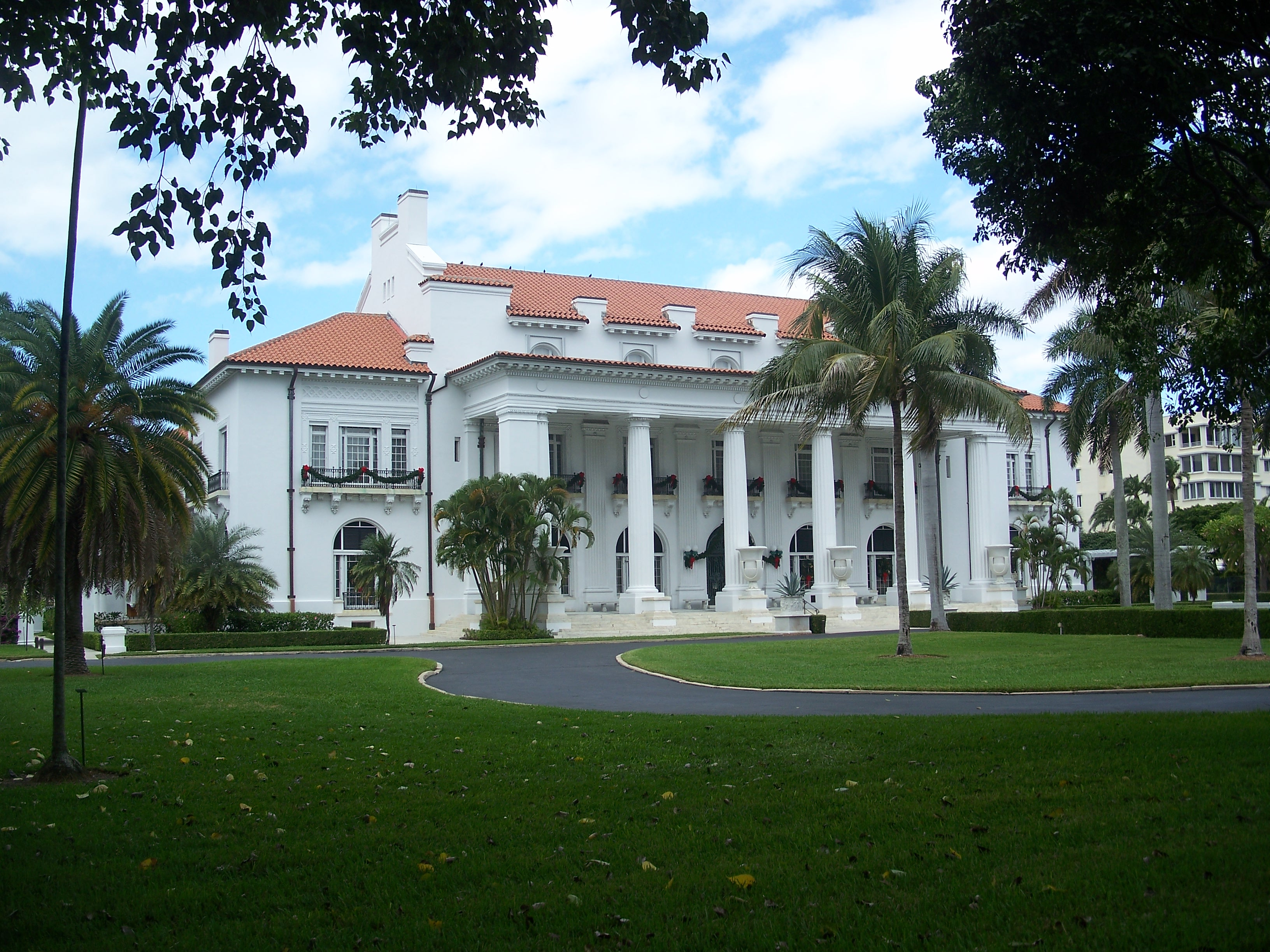
Whitehall, also known as Flagler Museum

Whitehall reopened as the Flagler Museum on February 6, 1960, after Henry Flagler's granddaughter, Jean Flagler Matthews, purchased the property in 1959 to prevent its demolition. Listed on the National Register of Historic Places in 1972 and the National Historic Landmark list in 2000, the museum replicates the original appearance of the house and has exhibits about Flagler himself, Flagler's personal railcar (built in 1886), the Florida East Coast Railway, life in the Gilded Age, and the early history of Palm Beach. Almost 100,000 people visit the museum annually. Adjacent to the Flagler Museum and behind the Royal Poinciana Chapel is a giant, almost 200-year old kapok tree, which also attracts visitors.

The Preservation Foundation of Palm Beach established Pan's Garden in 1994 along Hibiscus Avenue between Chilean Avenue and Peruvian Avenue. The garden has a statue of Pan (originally designed in 1890 by Frederick William MacMonnies), the ancient Greek god who protects and guards flocks. Another significant feature is the Casa Apava wall, a 1920s tile wall from the remnants of the Casa Apava estate. Encompassing approximately 0.5 acres (0.20 ha), the garden also features many endangered species of native vegetation.

Bethesda-by-the-Sea, originally a mostly wooden structure built from lumber from the beach in April 1889, is the oldest church in Palm Beach. The church opened at its current location by Christmas 1926. Bethesda-by-the-Sea has hosted the weddings of a few notable individuals, including Donald and Melania Trump in 2005 and Michael Jordan and Yvette Prieto in 2013.

=== Other points of interest ===
The Palm Beach Chamber of Commerce identifies several other points of interest in the town, including:

- Major Alley - Located on Peruvian Avenue just one block north of the western terminus of Worth Avenue, Major Alley (named after architect Howard Major) has six Georgian revival-style cottages built in the 1920s.
- Royal Poinciana Chapel - Built in 1897 by Henry Flagler, he intended for the interdenominational chapel to be used by guests at his hotels. The chapel expanded to 400 seats about a year later. It is adjacent to the Whitehall property.
- Seagull Cottage - Situated between the Royal Poinciana Chapel and Whitehall, Seagull Cottage is the oldest surviving home in the Palm Beach, constructed in 1886 by R.R. McCormick, a railroad and land developer from Denver. Flagler purchased Seagull Cottage from McCormick in 1893 for $75,000, and it remained his winter residence until 1902, when Whitehall was completed.
- Phipps Plaza Historic District - Described by the Palm Beach Daily News as a "picturesque ensemble" of buildings, the Phipps Plaza Historic District is a tight ring of structures built between the 1920s and the 1940s. Located just north of the intersection of Royal Palm Way and South County Road, the buildings at Phipps Plaza were mostly constructed by the Palm Beach Company, with the assistance of Addison Mizner and Marion Sims Wyeth.
- The Colony Hotel Palm Beach - A British Colonial-style hotel at South County Road and Hammond Avenue, just one block south of Worth Avenue. Opened in 1947, the six floor hotel has eighty-nine rooms and three penthouses.
- Addison Mizner Memorial Fountain - Erected by Mizner himself in 1929, the fountain is in the middle of South County Road directly north of the town hall and to the west of the police department headquarters. The fountain is constructed of double-bowl cast stone. In 2017, the restoration of the fountain was named the project of the year by the American Public Works Association's Florida chapter.

== Parks and recreation ==
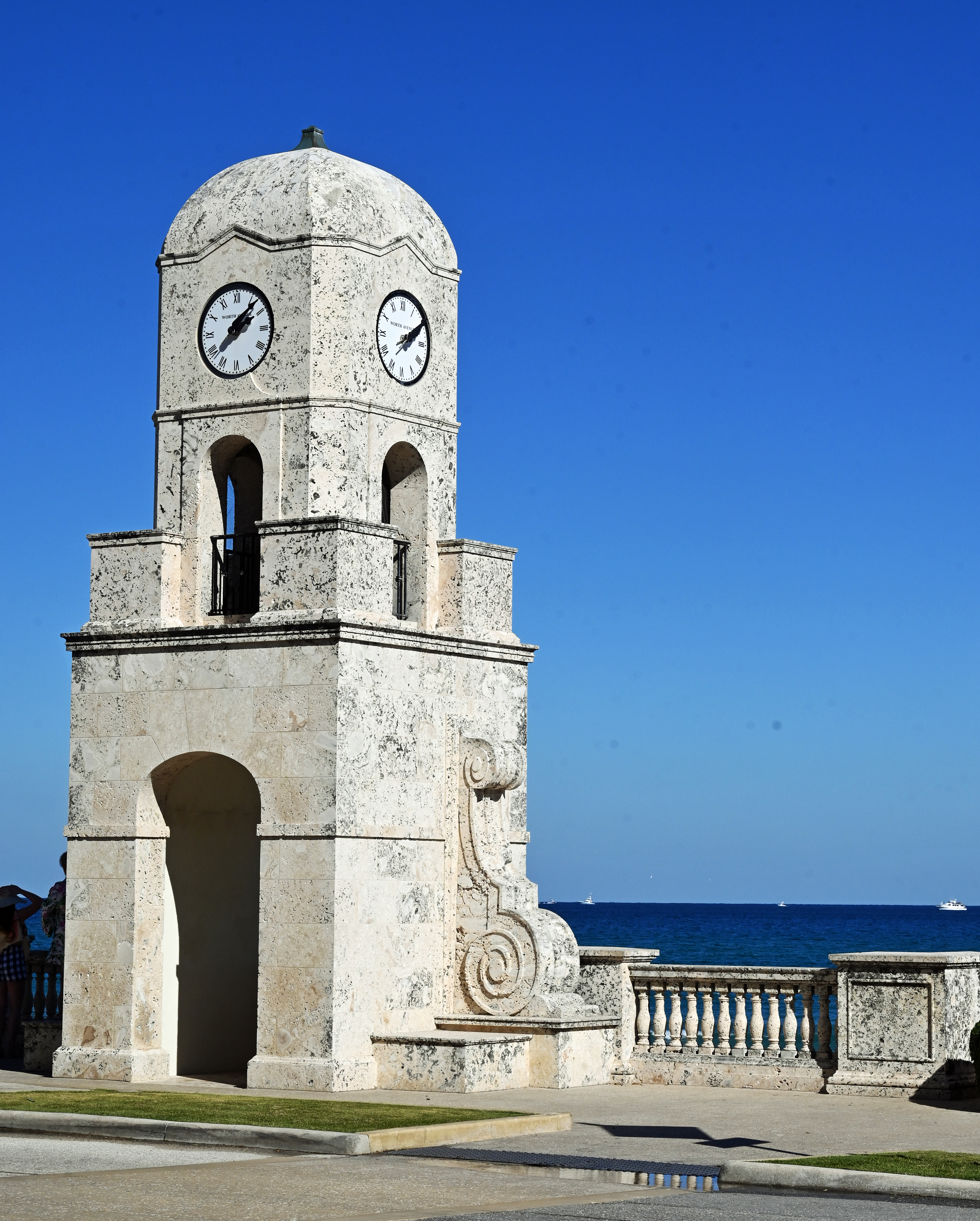
Clock tower at the municipal beach and east end of Worth Avenue

The Recreation Department of Palm Beach oversees several public recreation facilities, including the Morton and Barbara Mandel Recreation Center, Palm Beach Docks, Par 3 Golf Course, and many tennis centers. The only public marina in the town, the Palm Beach Docks opened in the 1940s and is along the Intracoastal Waterway between the Royal Palm Bridge and Worth Avenue. Palm Beach Docks has three main docks and eighty-eight boat slips, along with many accommodations for boaters.

There are three public beaches in the town, the Palm Beach Municipal Beach, Phipps Ocean Park, and R. G. Kreusler Park. The former, also known as Midtown Beach, has metered parking spots along South Ocean Boulevard from Royal Palm Way southward to Hammon Avenue. Phipps Ocean Park includes the Little Red Schoolhouse, the first school building in southeast Florida (built in 1886), restored and moved from its original location near where the Flagler Memorial Bridge stands today. The town also has many private beaches, while R. G. Kreusler Park (owned and operated by Palm Beach County) lies directly north of the Lake Worth Municipal Beach. In addition to Pan's Garden, the Preservation Foundation of Palm Beach also owns the Ambassador Earl T. Smith Memorial Park and Fountain, a small, 0.24 acre (0.097 ha) park near the town hall.

The town has three bicycling and pedestrian paths. The Lake Trail is a 4.7 mile (7.6 km) path along the Intracoastal Waterway from Worth Avenue to near the Lake Worth Inlet. Another trail, the County Road Pedestrian Path/Bicycle Lane is around 1.1 miles (1.8 km) in length from Kawama Lane to Bahama Lane along North County Road. The third path is the Southern Pedestrian/Bicycle Path, running from Sloan's Curve to the town's southern boundaries along State Road A1A, a distance of roughly 3.5 miles (5.6 km).

Palm Beach has several social and golf clubs, most notably the Everglades Club and Mar-a-Lago. The former, built by Addison Mizner and Paris Singer in 1918, had the original purpose of being a hospital for soldiers injured in World War I. However, the war soon ended and the facilities were restructured into a private club which opened in January 1919. Some of the amenities include a golf course, tennis courts, and reception halls. Everglades Club has nearly 1,000 members. The club, which is very exclusive, does not have a website and prohibits cellphones. Mar-a-Lago is 126-room, 62,500-square-foot (5,810 m^{2}) mansion that features many hotel-style amenities. Built between 1924 and 1927, General Foods and Post Cereals heiress Marjorie Merriweather Post originally owned the estate, but willed it to the United States government prior to her death in 1973 in hopes the residence would be used as a Winter White House. Mar-a-Lago was returned to the Post family in 1981, before being sold to future United States president Donald Trump in 1985 for approximately $10 million.

== Government ==
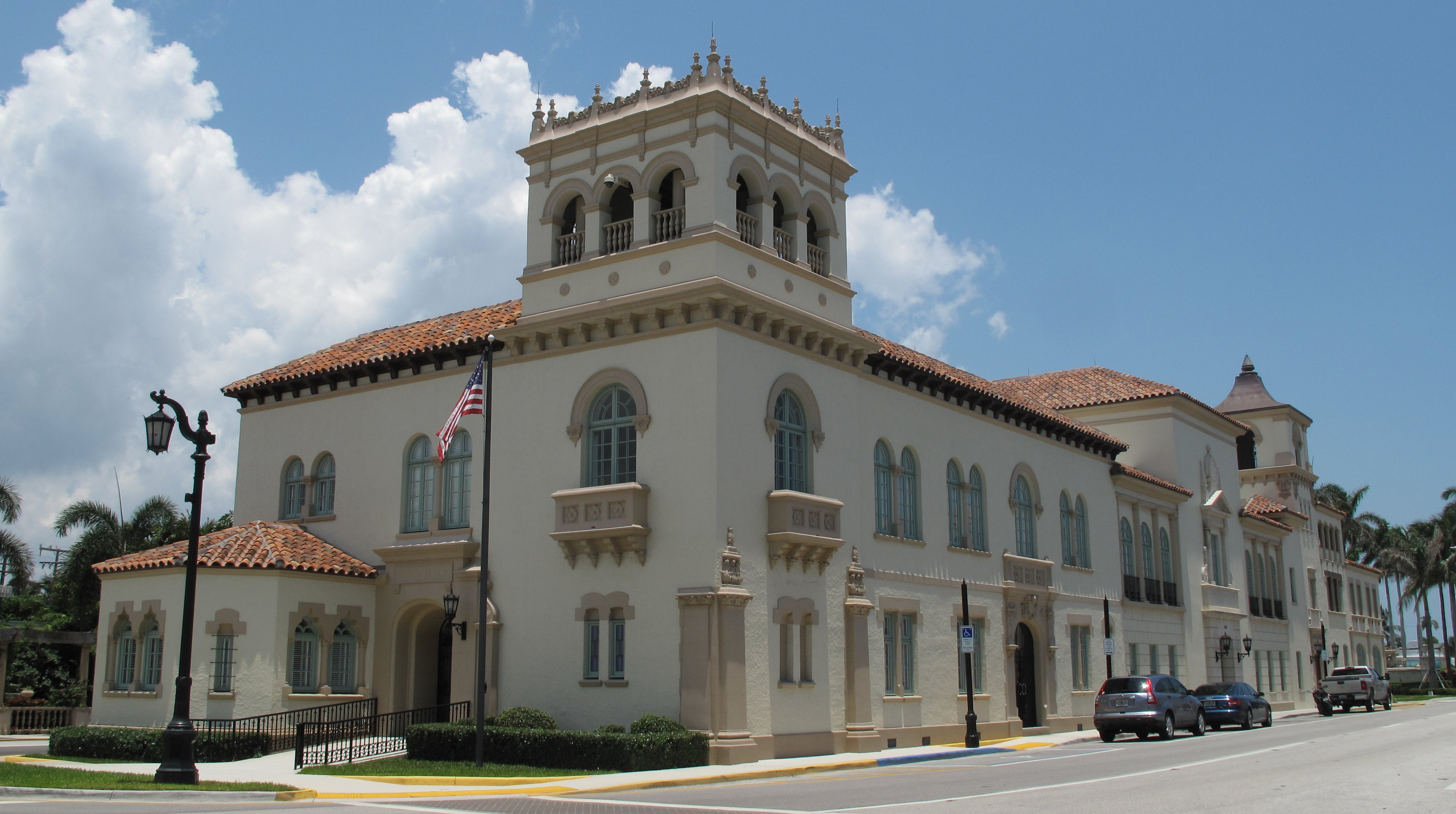
Palm Beach Town Hall

Palm Beach operates under a council–manager form of government. The town's legislative body, the town council, is composed of five members, who serve two-year terms and seek office in staggered, at-large, non-partisan elections. Once a month, the town council meets at the Palm Beach Town Hall, though special meetings may be conducted as needed. The mayor, also elected to two year terms, acts as ombudsman and an intergovernmental figure. Danielle Moore, a former three-term member of the town council, has served as mayor since April 13, 2021. Additionally, a town manager has the authority to appoint and supervise the senior management team, including the deputy town manager and department directors. The officeholder of town manager is appointed annually by the town council. Kirk Blouin, a former Palm Beach chief of police and later Director of Public Safety, has served as town manager since February 13, 2018.

Palm Beach is part of Florida's 22nd congressional district, which has been represented by Democrat Lois Frankel since 2023. The town at the state level is part of the 89th district of the Florida House of Representatives, which covers many of the immediate coastal cities in Palm Beach County from Palm Beach Shores southward. Palm Beach is also part of the 30th district of the Florida Senate, which includes northeastern and some of east-central Palm Beach County. Two districts represent the town at the Palm Beach County Board of County Commissioners. The town north of Worth Avenue is part of the 1st district, while the 7th district covers areas south of Worth Avenue. Palm Beach is a generally Republican town. In 2016, Donald Trump received 3,231 votes and Hillary Clinton received 2,612 votes.

== Education ==
The School District of Palm Beach County operates one school in the town, Palm Beach Public Elementary School, on Cocoanut Row between Seaview Avenue and Royal Palm Beach and directly east of the Society of the Four Arts. Opened in 1929, Palm Beach Public Elementary School has a school grade of A and an attendance of 362. Palm Beach Day Academy is a private school in the area. It was formed in 2006 from a merger between Palm Beach Day School and the Academy of the Palm Beaches. The school has one campus in Palm Beach and another in West Palm Beach. Most public middle school students attend Conniston Community Middle School in West Palm Beach, while students who live in the southern portions of the town attend Lake Worth Middle School. Public high school students in northern Palm Beach attend Palm Beach Gardens Community High School and students residing elsewhere in the town attend Forest Hill Community High School. Palm Beach is also near Dreyfoos School of the Arts, though that school has no attendance boundaries.

There are no colleges or universities in Palm Beach. However, the nearby cities of Lake Worth Beach and West Palm Beach have a few public and private higher education institutes, including Keiser University, Palm Beach Atlantic University, and Palm Beach State College.

== Media ==
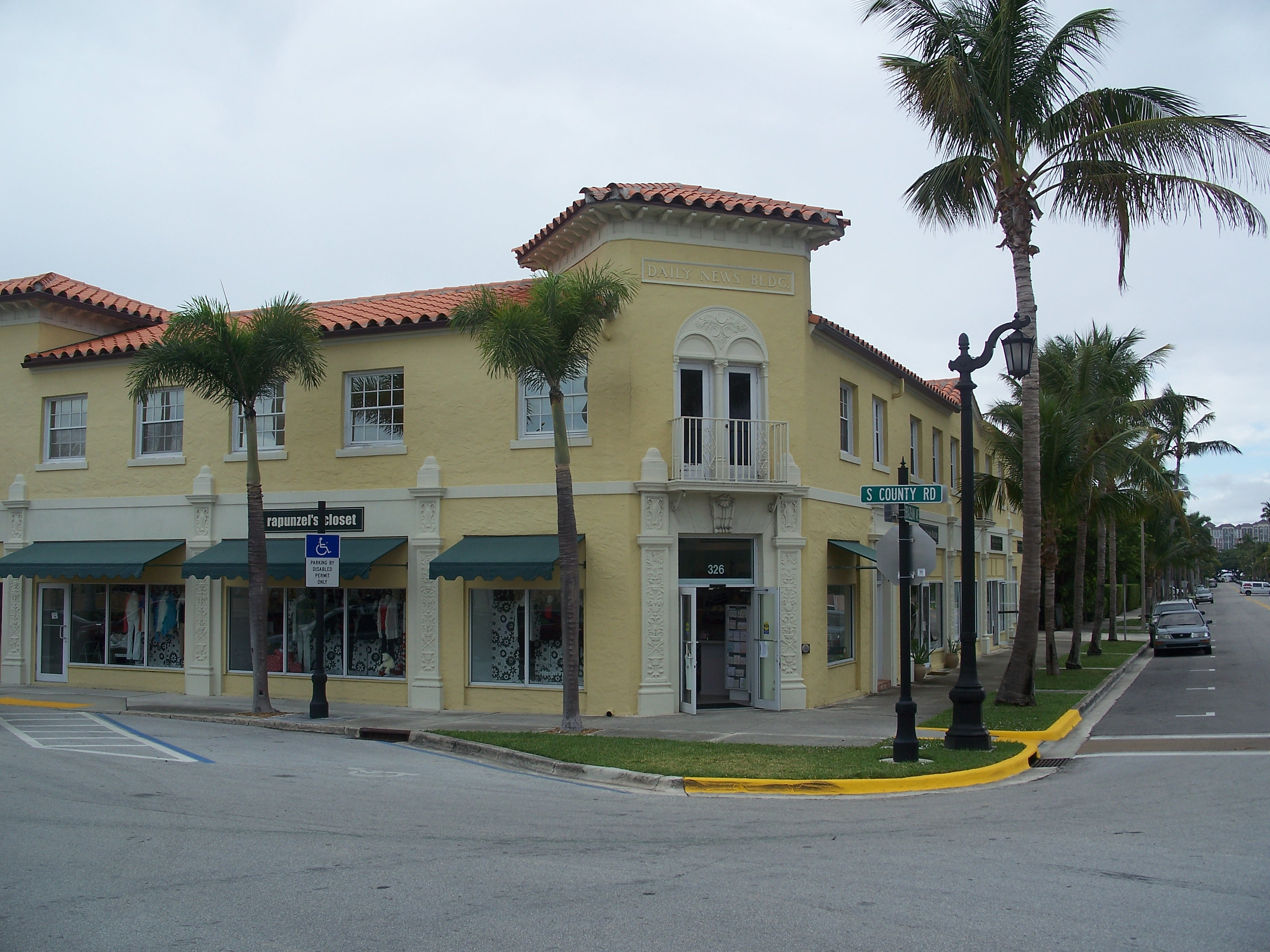
The building where the Palm Beach Daily News was published from 1925 to 1974

The town is served by the Palm Beach Daily News, with a daily circulation of approximately 4,500. The Palm Beach Daily News began publishing in 1897 under the name Daily Lake Worth News. Between 1925 and 1974, the newspaper was published in a building that has been listed on the National Register of Historic Places since 1985. Owned by Cox Enterprises since 1969, GateHouse Media purchased the newspaper and The Palm Beach Post in May 2018. The Palm Beach Daily News is also known as "The Shiny Sheet" due to its former heavy, slick newsprint stock.

Residents of the town are also served by The Palm Beach Post, which is actually published in West Palm Beach. The Palm Beach Post had the 5th largest circulation for a newspaper in Florida as of November 2017 and is served to subscribers throughout Palm Beach County and the Treasure Coast.

Palm Beach is part of the West Palm Beach–Fort Pierce television market, ranked as the 38th largest in the United States by Nielsen Media Research. The market is served by stations affiliated with major American networks including WPBT/2 (PBS), WPTV-TV/5 (NBC), WHDT/9 (Ind.), WPEC/12 (CBS), WPBF/25 (ABC), WFLX/29 (FOX), WTVX/34 (CW), WXEL-TV/42 (PBS), WTCN-CD/43 (MyTV), WWHB-CD/48 (Roar), WFGC/61 (CTN), WPXP-TV/67 (ION), as well as local channel WBWP-LD/57 (Ind.). Since 2017, the Palm Beach Civic Association has produced weekly video newscasts, known as Palm Beach TV, which have a weekly viewership of approximately 12,000.

Many radio stations are within range of the town. Radio stations WRMF (97.9 FM) and WPBV-LP (98.3 FM) are both based in the town of Palm Beach.

== Historic preservation ==
The Landmarks Preservation Commission (LPC), established by an ordinance approved by the town council in 1979, studies and protects historic structures in Palm Beach. The LPC has a list of 328 properties, sites, and vistas it works to protect under the 1979 ordinance. Similarly, the Preservation Foundation of Palm Beach is "dedicated to preserving the architectural and cultural heritage and the unique scenic quality of the Town of Palm Beach", according to its mission statement. The town of Palm Beach also conducts historic sites surveys in collaboration with preservation organizations, historians, and local officials, with the most recent survey completed in December 2020. The 2010 survey identified 50 structures that had been demolished since the previous survey in 2004 and others that had been altered significantly.

Federally, thirteen structures and one historic district have been listed on the National Register of Historic Places. However, two of the designated buildings have since been destroyed. A fire and subsequent burglaries at the Bingham-Blossom House likely contributed to the owner's decision to have it demolished in 1974, while construction crews razed the Brelsford House in 1975 after trustees at the Royal Poinciana Chapel (the property where the building was located) believed "the aging structure was more of a liability than an asset" and also cited its high costs of renovation for public use, according to The Palm Beach Post.

== Transportation ==
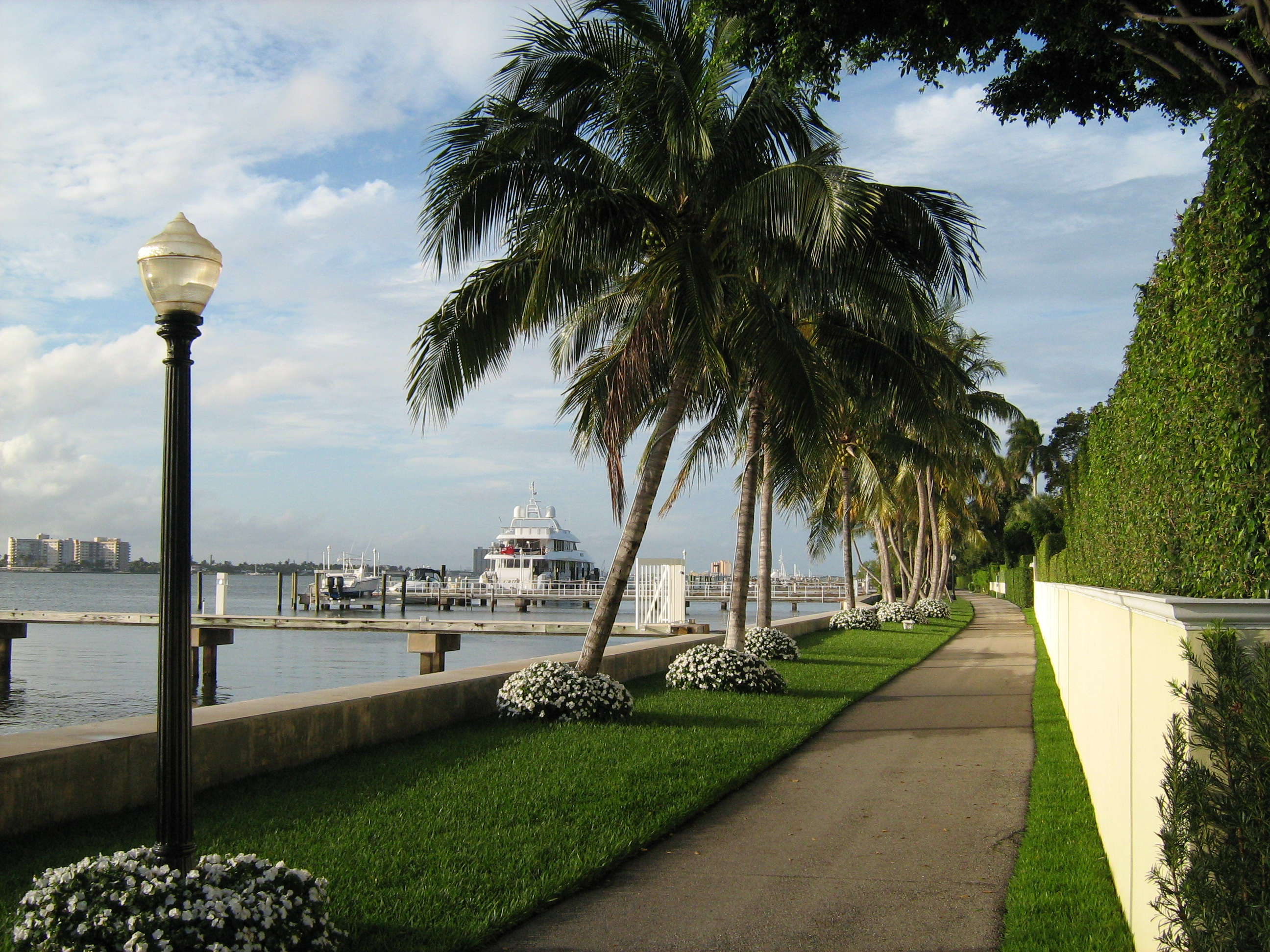
Lake Trail along the Intracoastal Waterway

Three bridges traverse the Intracoastal Waterway, linking Palm Beach and West Palm Beach by roadway. The northernmost bridge, the Flagler Memorial Bridge, is along State Road A1A, which is locally known as Royal Poinciana Way in Palm Beach and Quadrille Boulevard in West Palm Beach. First opening in 1938, the bridge underwent a 5-year reconstruction and renovation between 2012 and 2017 at a cost of $106 million. State Road 704, also known as Royal Palm Way in Palm Beach and Lakeview Avenue and Okeechobee Boulevard in West Palm Beach, is the location of the middle bridge. Named the Royal Park Bridge, it first opened in 1911 and was most recently replaced in 2005. The Southern Boulevard Bridge at the conjunction of U.S. Route 98 and State Road 80 (locally known as Southern Boulevard) is the southernmost bridge. First completed in 1950, the bridge underwent a $97 million replacement project between April 2017 and September 2022.

State Road A1A also runs northward through much of Palm Beach, beginning at the southern limits of the town as South Ocean Boulevard until being redirected onto South County Road, which later becomes North County Road. At Royal Poinciana Way, A1A turns westward onto that road and across the Flagler Memorial Bridge. State Roads 80 and 704 and U.S. Route 98 all terminate shortly after entering the town after intersecting with A1A. The town has no interstate highways, though Interstate 95 passes through the nearby city of West Palm Beach. Private vehicles and taxis are the predominant means of transport in Palm Beach. Incidents of profiling of lower-cost cars and minorities have occurred, sometimes resulting in tense relations between visitors and the town.

The nearby city of West Palm Beach has two train stations. Tri-Rail and Amtrak serve the Tamarind Avenue station, while the higher speed Brightline serves the Evernia Street station. Palm Beach is about 4.5 miles (7.2 km) east of President Donald J. Trump International Airport. The northern and central portions of Palm Beach are served by Palm Tran Route 41, which travels to places in the town such as the Lake Worth Inlet, North County Road and Wells Road, Publix (Bradley Place and Sunrise Avenue), Royal Palm Way (State Road 704) and South County Road (State Road A1A), and various points between. The route returns to the Intermodal Transit Center in West Palm Beach, which connects to several other bus routes and is adjacent to the train station on Tamarind Avenue.

== Emergency services ==
=== Police ===
The town has its own police department, established on October 17, 1922. Prior to then, town marshal Joseph Borman served in the capacity of chief law enforcer as outlined in the 1911 charter. The department employed 61 officers in 2018. With a population of 8,295 people in 2018 according to the Florida Bureau of Economic and Business Research, this translated to 7.35 officers per 1,000 people, compared to the Florida average of 2.49 officers per 1,000 people. In the same year, the department made 2,039 arrests – equal to about 24,581 arrests per 100,000 people, the highest arrest rate in Florida and over sevenfold the state average. However, many arrests were in relation to non-violent crimes, such as those involving auto theft, criminal traffic citations, fraud, and scams. The police department reported no rapes or homicides in Palm Beach in 2018.

=== Firefighting ===
In its early days, the town of Palm Beach depended heavily on the city of West Palm Beach for firefighting efforts. The Flagler Alerts, a volunteer firefighting group which later became the West Palm Beach Fire Department, responded to fires in Palm Beach by traversing the Intracoastal Waterway via ferry or railroad. Delayed response times and high insurance rates eventually led Palm Beach to establish its own fire-rescue department in December 1921. Today, the Palm Beach Fire Rescue has three stations, retains 82 employees – 75 full-time and 7 part-time, and annually responds to approximately 2,600 calls.

== Utilities ==
Florida Power & Light (FPL) provides electricity to the town of Palm Beach, along with much of the state's east coast. As of December 31, 2019, FPL serves 5 million customers statewide, which is approximately 10 million people. Much of the electricity supplied by FPL is sourced from natural gas, followed by nuclear energy. The nearest FPL power plant is in Riviera Beach, while the closest nuclear power station is the St. Lucie Nuclear Power Plant, on Hutchinson Island. Palm Beach officials have considered undergrounding at least since commissioning a 2006 study on the burial of electrical lines. In the subsequent years, undergrounding projects were initially performed by neighborhood on a "as requested" basis. However, following a 2014 town council meeting with FPL workers and a related voter-approved ballot question in 2016, it was decided a town-wide undergrounding project would be undertaken at a cost of approximately $90 million. The project is ongoing as of March 2020.

The town government provides and oversees sewage systems and wastewater treatment. Sewage is collected via 41 miles (66 km) of mainline pipes at the more than 40 pumping stations, which are capable of transporting over 100,000 US gallons (380,000 L; 83,000 imp gal) of water each minute. The sewage is then pumped into a regional wastewater treatment facility in West Palm Beach. Tap water has been supplied by the city of West Palm Beach since 1955, when the city purchased Palm Beach's water system, then owned by the Flagler Water Company. West Palm Beach provided tap water services to the town at no cost until the beginning of 1995.

Recycling and garbage collection services are also provided by the town of Palm Beach. The former is taken to a transfer station, where the Palm Beach County Solid Waste Authority transports the garbage to a landfill in West Palm Beach. Vegetative yard trash is taken to two different sites in West Palm Beach.

== Notable people ==
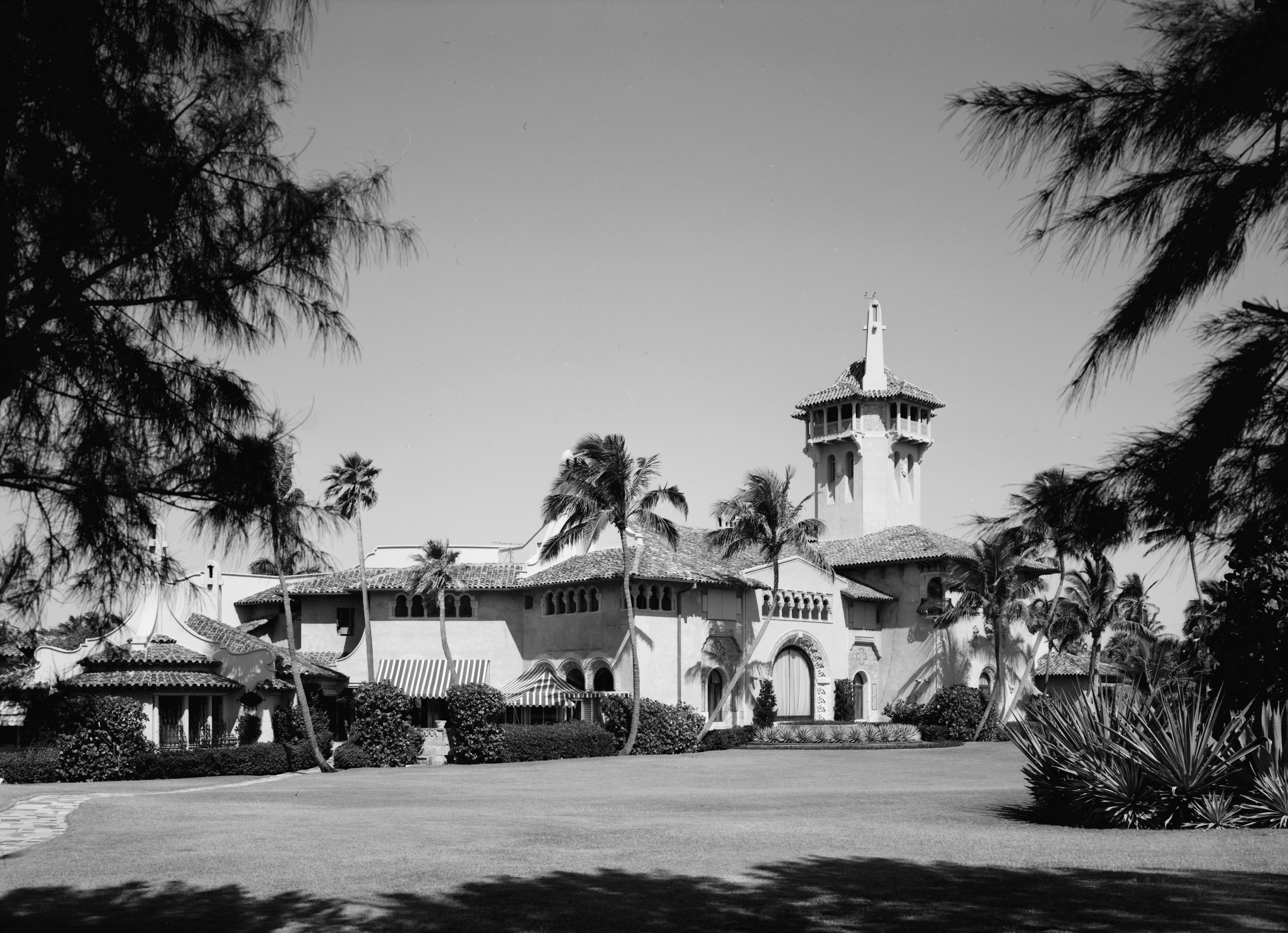
Mar-a-Lago, the residence of president Donald Trump

The town of Palm Beach is also known for its many famous part-time and full-time residents. Prior to the arrival of Henry Flagler in the 1890s, a few wealthy or otherwise notable people already resided in Palm Beach, including businessman and Autocar Company founder Louis Semple Clarke and scientist Thomas Adams, a pioneer of the chewing gum industry. Earl E. T. Smith and Paul Ilyinsky, both of whom formerly held the office of Mayor of Palm Beach, were notable for other reasons. Smith previously served as an Ambassador of the United States to Cuba, while Ilyinsky was the son of Grand Duke Dmitri Pavlovich of Russia and heiress Audrey Emery.

Two United States Presidents have been part-time residents, John F. Kennedy and Donald Trump, with both designating their respective Palm Beach properties as a Winter White House. Kennedy's Winter White House, La Querida, was built by Addison Mizner in 1923 and previously owned by department store magnate Rodman Wanamaker of Philadelphia before Joseph P. Kennedy Sr. purchased the property in 1933. Trump has owned Mar-a-Lago since 1985, purchasing the property from the family of the late Marjorie Merriweather Post, heiress of Post cereal. In October 2019, Trump and first lady Melania Trump filed to switch their primary domicile from New York City to Mar-a-Lago, officially establishing residency in Palm Beach. Following the conclusion of his first term as president in January 2021, Donald and Melania Trump resided at Mar-a-Lago amidst a dispute from some neighbors about the legality of them taking up permanent residence at the club. Donald Trump used Mar-a-Lago as a Winter White House again when his second, non-consecutive term as President of the United States began in January 2025. Additionally, former Canadian prime minister Brian Mulroney was a resident of Palm Beach from 1997 until his death in 2024.

== In popular culture ==
The 2024 American television miniseries Palm Royale, a period comedy-drama, portrays the upscale society of Palm Beach in 1969 as insulated from the Vietnam War and the counterculture of the 1960s.
