= Tideline Ocean Resort & Spa =

Tideline Ocean Resort and Spa - Palm Beach
- Interactive map of the Tideline Ocean Resort and Spa - Palm Beach area

General information
- Location: 2842 South Ocean Boulevard; Palm Beach, Florida, United States
- Coordinates: 26.620583°N 80.038749°W
- Opening: 2009
- Owner: Jeff Greene

Other information
- Number of rooms: 134
- Number of restaurants: 1

Tideline Ocean Resort and Spa - Palm Beach, formerly named Omphoy Ocean Resort, is a luxury hotel that opened in Palm Beach, Florida, United States during the summer of 2009. The Tideline Ocean Resort & Spa is a 134-room property situated on South Ocean Blvd.

The Tideline Ocean Resort and Spa is the first new hotel development in Palm Beach since 1990. The luxury hotel features one beachfront restaurant, Brandon's and a full service spa.

Developed by Obadon Hotels, and decorated by Leslie Schlesinger, the Tideline features 134 guest rooms and suites and is built on a direct beach front property.

In 2011 the Tideline was acquired by Jeff Greene for $42 million.

== Controversies ==
In January 2010, Palm Beach town council ordered the hotel to remove a cabana that it had erected on the beach without the town's permission. It also turned down the hotel's request for permission to add a beach house.
