= William Gray Warden House =

Historic house in Florida, United States

- U.S. National Register of Historic Places
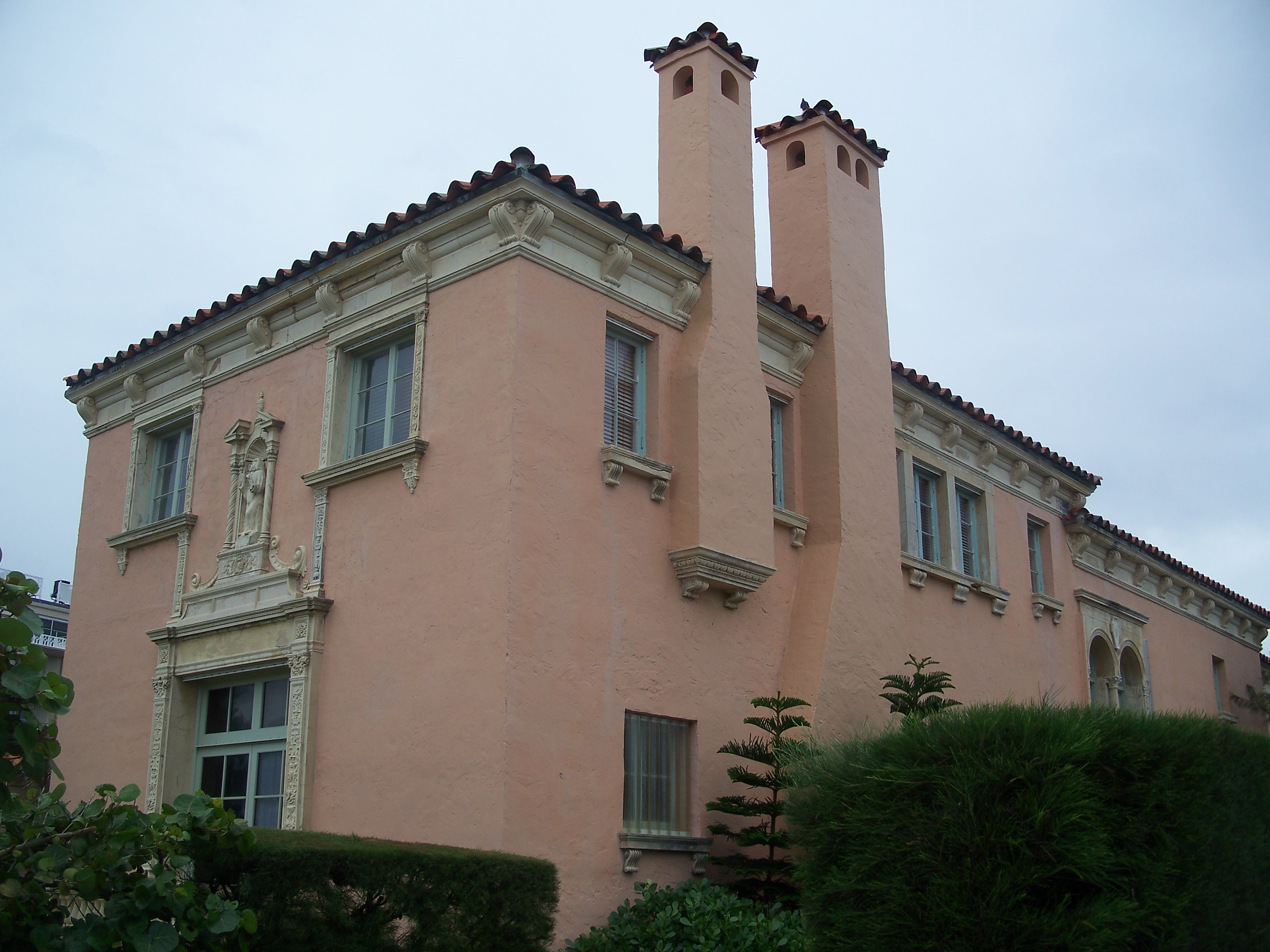

- Location within Florida Location within the United States
- Location: Palm Beach, Florida
- Coordinates: 26°43′17″N 80°2′8″W
- Architect: Addison Mizner
- Architectural style: Mediterranean Revival-Spanish Colonial Revival
- NRHP reference No.: 84000940
- Added to NRHP: August 1, 1984

The William Gray Warden House (also known as the Warden House) is a historic home in Palm Beach, Florida. It is located at 112 Seminole Avenue. On August 1, 1984, it was added to the U.S. National Register of Historic Places.

The residence was designed by renowned architect Addison Mizner in 1922, in the Mediterranean Revival-Spanish Colonial Revival styles.
