= Katherine Wilson =

Katherine or Catherine Wilson may refer to:

- Catherine Wilson (1822–1862), British woman hanged for murder
- Catherine Wilson (philosopher) (born 1951), British philosopher
- Catherine Stubblefield Wilson (born 1939), American child pornography distributor
- Katherine Austen (née Wilson; 1629–c. 1683), writer
- Katherine Sheppard (née Wilson; 1848–1934), suffragette in New Zealand
- Katie Wilson (Katherine Barrett Wilson; born 1982), American politician and activist
- Kathy Y. Wilson (died 2022), American journalist and writer
- Marie Wilson (American actress) (Katherine Elisabeth Wilson; 1916–1972), American radio, film actress

== See also ==
- Kate Wilson (disambiguation)
- Kathleen Wilson (1911–2005), American actress
- Wilson (surname)
