= Palm Beach Town Hall =

- U.S. National Register of Historic Places
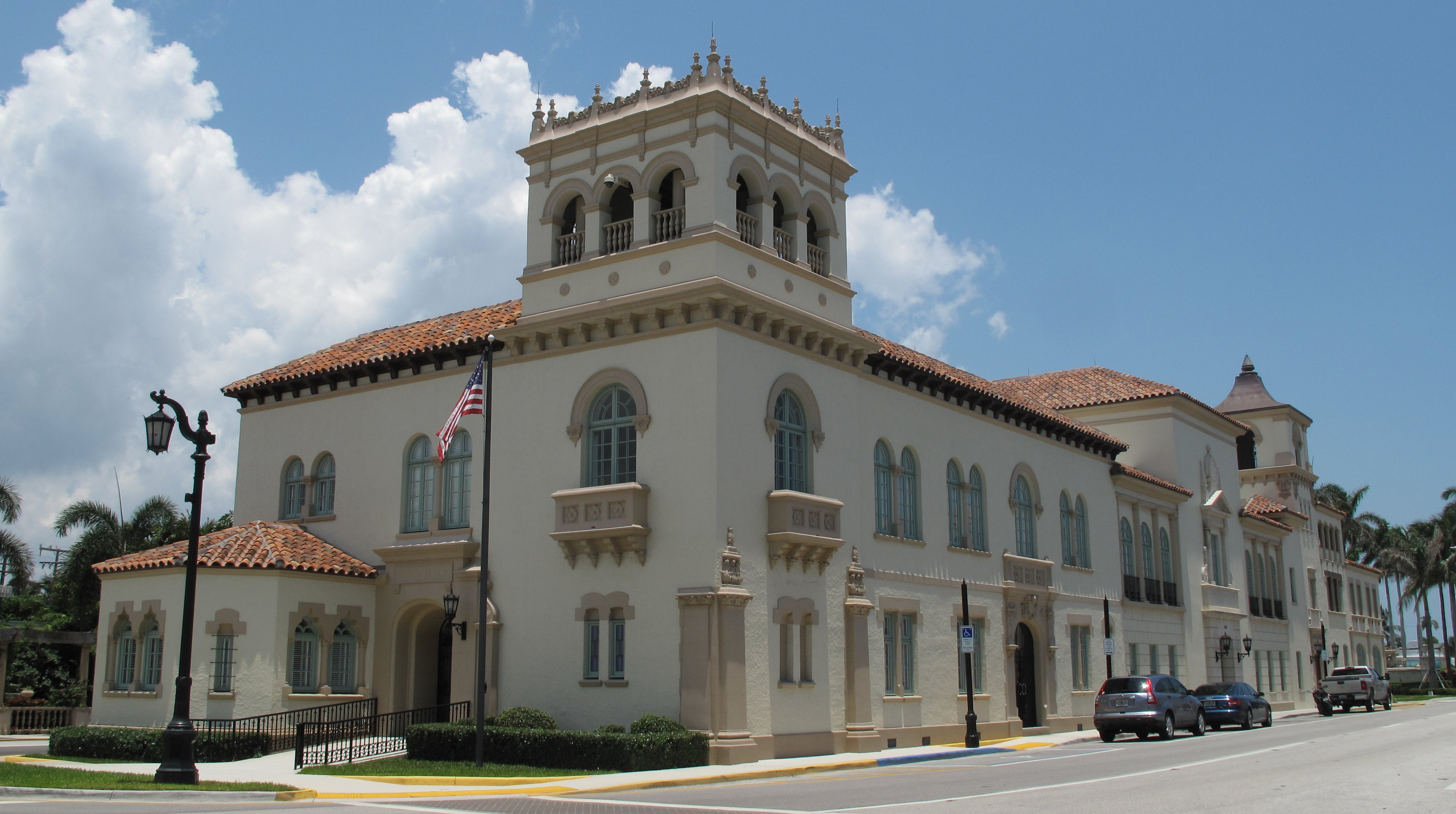
- Front of the Town Hall from the South East.

- Location within Florida Location within the United States
- Location: Palm Beach, Florida, U.S.
- Coordinates: 26°42′9″N 80°2′12″W
- Built: 1925
- Architectural style: Spanish Revival
- NRHP reference No.: 04001571
- Added to NRHP: January 28, 2005

The Palm Beach Town Hall is a historic site in Palm Beach, Florida, located at 360 South County Road. A Spanish Colonial Revival-type structure, the building was designed by local architectural firm Harvey and Clarke and opened in 1925. Since then, it has served as the Town Hall for Palm Beach. Architect John L. Volk and contractor E.B. Walton made a major modification to the property in 1967, filling in a courtyard and combining what was originally two separate buildings. The government of Palm Beach has listed this building as a town landmark since 1979 and as an anchor of the Town Hall Square historic district since 1990, around the time when a significant restoration project occurred. On January 28, 2005, the Palm Beach Town Hall was added to the U.S. National Register of Historic Places.

== History and description ==
The town of Palm Beach, Florida, was incorporated in 1911. Before this building opened in 1925, the town government functioned within a single-floor wooden structure on Royal Poinciana Way. In February 1924, the town council approved a bond issue, which included an allocation of $100,000 to construct a new government building. At the time, The Palm Beach Post stated that "for many years, the citizens of Palm Beach have wished for a Town Hall to accommodate the different departments of the town government and in harmony with the high standards of architectural beauty prevalent in the resort." The council also agreed to place the new municipal building in the middle of South County Road (then known as Palm Beach Avenue). The new location also placed the center of town government much closer to the socialite activity occurring at the Everglades Club and on Worth Avenue.

In October 1924, the town of Palm Beach hired Harvey and Clarke, a local architectural firm that designed several notable structures, while Newlon and Stephens was awarded the contract to construct the building. Bennett, Parsons, & Frost of Chicago, a consulting firm hired by the town, criticized the decision to place the building in the middle of South County Road in a 1930 report, but ultimately recommended against constructing another Town Hall or relocating it. On December 18, 1925, the Town Hall was completed. A Spanish Colonial Revival-type structure located at 360 South County Road, the building features some sections with two-stories and others with three-stories and initially housed the fire and police departments. The 1925 Town Hall was also originally two buildings, with a courtyard separating them. However, in 1967, seeing the need to add office space, the town decided to fill in the courtyard, hiring architect John L. Volk and contractor E.B. Walton to complete this task.

Jane S. Day and Carl Shiver of the Florida Bureau of Historic Preservation noted that "during the 1970s and 1980s, Town Hall suffered some inappropriate alterations and the usual wear and tear of regular use." Consequently, in 1988, the Preservation Foundation of Palm Beach began collecting funds to restore the building, ultimately raising approximately $600,000. Firms and organizations participating in the renovation, which occurred in 1990, received an American Institute of Architects Award of Excellence and a Florida Trust Award. For example, Keystone Restoration, Inc. "restored the entire exterior and major portions of the interior including: major ornamental cast stone and masonry work; restoration and replication of all doors, windows, transoms, installation of new cathedral glass, ornamental iron work, entrance gates, railings and details; installation of new air conditioning, lightning and hurricane protection system; sidewalks, historic lighting fixtures, drywall, partition, plaster, structural concrete, hardware, restoration of historic day barrel till roofing, new copper roof and ornamental copper finials."

On January 28, 2005, the Palm Beach Town Hall was listed on the National Register of Historic Places. Previously, the town of Palm Beach had declared the Town Hall a landmark on July 11, 1979. Additionally, the Town Hall anchors Town Hall Square, a locally-designated (in 1990) historic district. Town Hall Square is composed of 17 structures, most of them designed by Harvey and Clarke, Treanor and Fatio, and Addison Mizner.

== Gallery ==
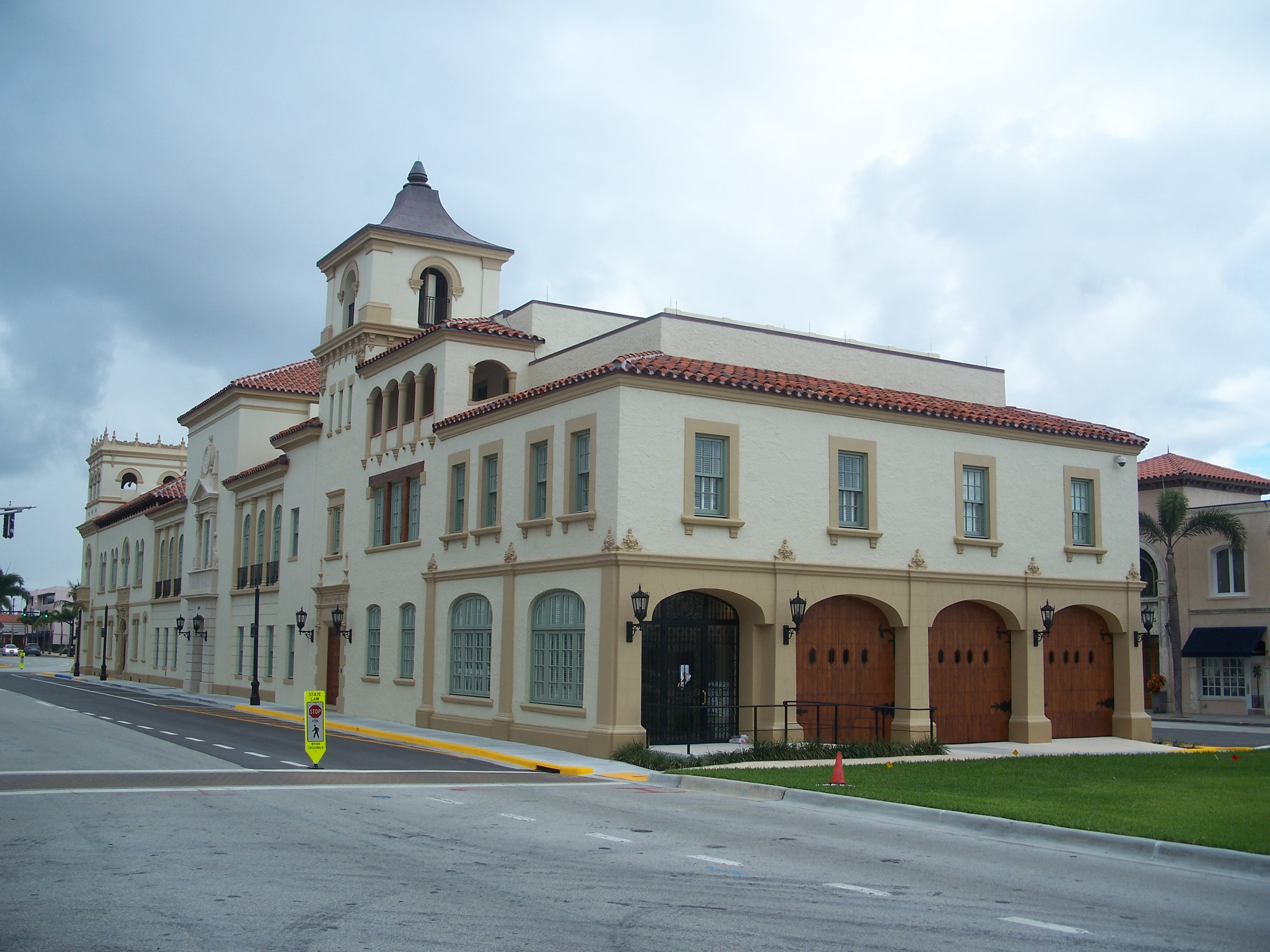
Town Hall from the North, with the doors from the now removed Fire Department.

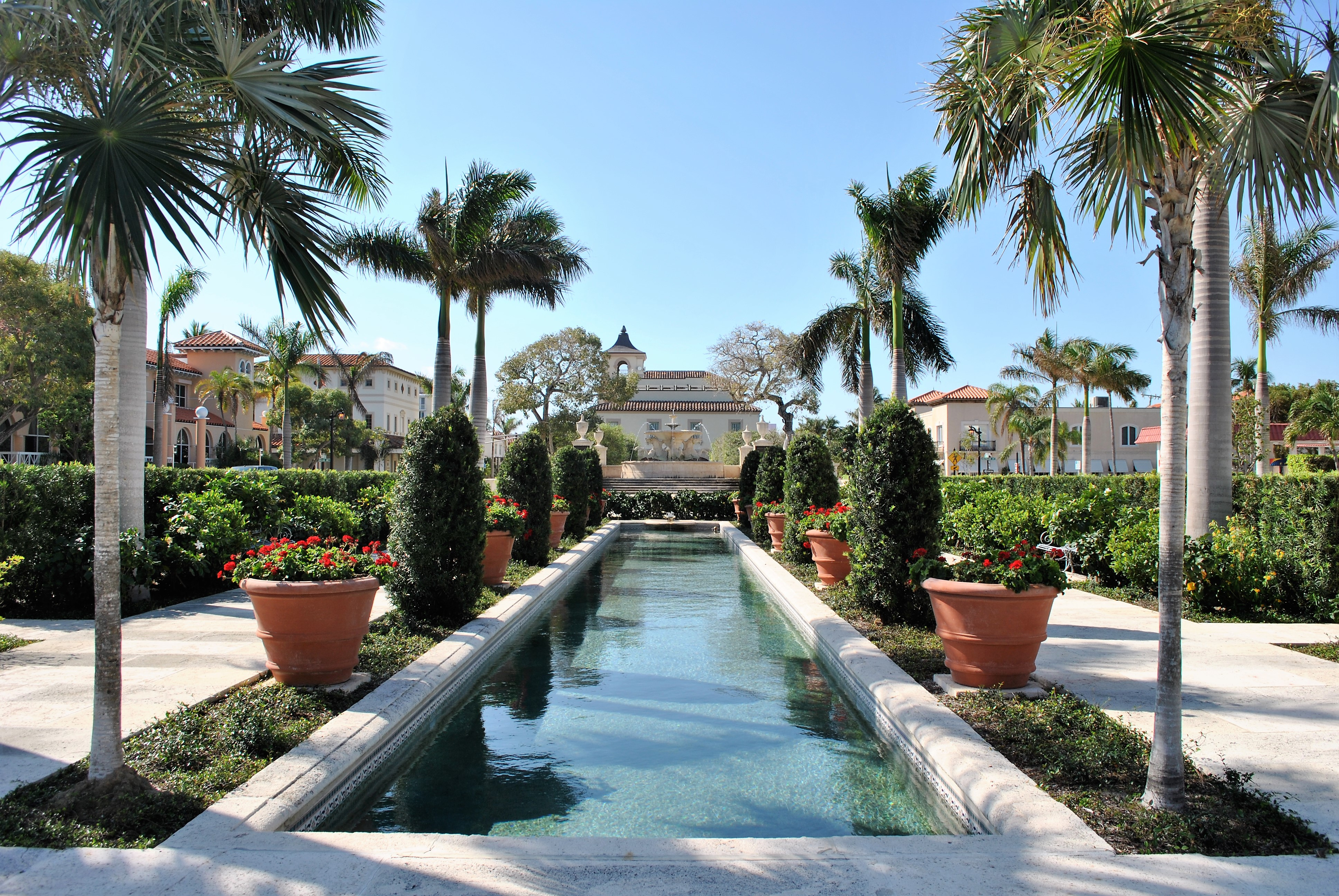
Memorial Park and pool behind the Town Hall, recently renovated

== See also ==
- National Register of Historic Places listings in Palm Beach County, Florida
