= Sarah Wilson (dog trainer) =

- Born: 1960 (age 65–66); Wellesley, Massachusetts
- Occupations: Author, dog trainer, speaker
- Website: sarahwilsondogexpert.com

Sarah Wilson (born 1960) is an American author, dog trainer, and international speaker. She is the author of eight books about subjects related to pet ownership.

== Early life ==
Sarah Wilson was born in 1960 in Wellesley, Massachusetts and raised in the western suburbs of Boston. She graduated from Amherst College with a liberal arts degree. and from Lesley University with a Master's degree focused on the human-animal relationship. She was formerly married to Brian Kilcommons, with whom she has written several books on various subjects related to pet ownership. As of 2013, she lives in St. Louis, Missouri.

== Career ==
Wilson began her professional career as a pet dog trainer in New York City teaching in Prospect Park. In the next two decades, she trained all dogs from celebrity pets to tracking dogs to service animals. Consulting for Guiding Eyes for the Blind since 1995, she presented for them at American Council of the Blind. She is an international speaker on dog training, behavior, and the human/animal bond. Her experience includes managing kennels (large and small), assisting veterinarians and groomers, helping shelters and rescues, and training for various dog sports.

== Awards ==
Wilson and Kilcommons have been honored with the Dr Steve Kritsick Memorial Award from the New York State Veterinary Medical Society and the Dr. A. Wayne Mountain Memorial Media Award from the Pennsylvania Veterinary Medical Association. They have also been nominated twice for the Humane Society of the United States Genesis Award for their Parade Magazine cover articles.

== Television appearances ==
- Nature: "Why We Love Cats and Dogs"
- CBS News: "New breed of grandparents fawn over grandpuppies"

== Published works ==
- Kilcommons, Brian; and Sarah Wilson (1994). Childproofing Your Dog: A Complete Guide to Preparing Your Dog for the Children in Your Life, Grand Central Publishing, 96 pages. ISBN 978-0446670166
- Kilcommons, Brian; and Sarah Wilson (1995). Good Owners, Great Cats, Grand Central Publishing, 224 pages. ISBN 978-0446518079
- Kilcommons, Brian; and Sarah Wilson (1997). Tails From the Bark Side, Warner Books, 256 pages. ISBN 978-0446521505
- Kilcommons, Brian; and Sarah Wilson (1999). Good Owners, Great Dogs, Grand Central Publishing, 288 pages. ISBN 978-0446675383
- Kilcommons, Brian; and Sarah Wilson (1999). Paws to Consider: Choosing the Right Dog for You and Your Family, Grand Central Publishing, 272 pages. ISBN 978-0446521512
- Kilcommons, Brian; and Sarah Wilson (2001). Metrodog: The Essential Guide to Raising Your Dog in the City, Warner Books, 320 pages. ISBN 978-0446526036
- Kilcommons, Brian; and Sarah Wilson (2006). My Smart Puppy: Fun, Effective, and Easy Puppy Training, Grand Central Publishing, 352 pages. ISBN 978-0446578868
- Croke, Vicki; and Sarah Wilson (2008). Dogology: What Your Relationship with Your Dog Reveals about You, Rodale, Inc., 256 pages. ISBN 978-1594869204
- Wilson, Sarah (2014). "My Smart Puppy Guide: How to Train Your Dog to Come", Sarah Wilson, 80 pages. ISBN 978-0991469413
