= Sara E. Wilson =

American biomechanical engineer

Sara Ellen Wilson is an American biomechanical engineer whose publication topics include ergonomics, applications of control theory in understanding the coordination of the human musculoskeletal system, the effects of occupational disorders on the spine and lower back, and engineering education. She is an associate professor of mechanical engineering at the University of Kansas, the former chair of the Bioengineering Division of the American Society of Mechanical Engineers, and vice-chair of the National Institute for Engineering Ethics.

== Education and career ==
Wilson was an undergraduate at the Rensselaer Polytechnic Institute, where she received a bachelor's degree in biomedical engineering in 1992. Continuing her studies at the Massachusetts Institute of Technology, she received a master's degree in mechanical engineering in 1994, and completed her Ph.D. in medical engineering in 1999. Her doctoral dissertation, Analysis of the forces on the spine during a fall with applications towards predicting vertebral fracture risk, was supervised by Elizabeth R. (Betsy) Myers of the Harvard Medical School.

Wilson was a postdoctoral researcher at the University of Virginia, working there with Kevin Granata. Next, she joined the University of Kansas in 2001, and was tenured there in 2007. She directed the Bioengineering Graduate Program from 2010 until 2018, and chaired the ASME Bioengineering Division for the 2015–2016 term.

== Recognition ==
The University of Kansas named Wilson as a 2006 W. T. Kemper Fellow for Teaching Excellence. She was elected as an ASME Fellow in 2017.
