= Kate Wilson (scientist) =

British Molecular Biologist

Katherine Wilson
- Born: Shipton, United Kingdom.
- Scientific career
- Workplaces: Office of Environment and Heritage (New South Wales)

Katherine Wilson is a molecular biologist and a marine scientist. She is also the executive director of the science division at the Office of Environment and Heritage (OEH), New South Wales. Wilson is responsible for the delivery of OEH's science program, which provides technical analysis, expert advice and research to support the NSW government's policy and program objectives in environmental management. As a member of the OEH Executive, Wilson guides delivery of services ranging from energy efficiency programs to management of national parks. Wilson is also a Board Member of the Low Carbon Living Cooperative Research Centre and Chair of the External Advisory Committee, Australian Rivers and Wetlands Centre, University of New South Wales.

== Career ==
Wilson's research interests began in molecular biology and application to aquaculture and agricultural problems in rhizobial ecology. Prior to joining the Office of Environment and Heritage, Wilson was Director of the Wealth from Oceans Flagship at the CSIRO. In this position Wilson was leading and managing Australia's largest marine research portfolio, driving research from coastal to deep-sea ecosystems and from marine ecology to offshore industries. She was co-founder of the Centre for the Application of Molecular Biology to International Agriculture (Canberra), and research leader in tropical aquaculture at the Australian Institute of Marine Science, Townsville.

Wilson has held previous board positions for the Marine and Coastal Committee (a COAG subcommittee); Western Australian Marine Science Institution; CRC Torres Strait; the Centre for the Application of Molecular Biology to International Agriculture and was an editorial board member for the Marine Biotechnology journal, published by Springer-Verlag.

Wilson was previously Chair of the Research and Development Working Group for the Marine and Coastal Committee and the governing council of the Australian-New Zealand Consortium for the International Ocean Drilling Program. Wilson has held an Adjunct Senior Lecturer position at the School of Life Science, University of Queensland, the School of Biomedical and Molecular Science, James Cook University and the Department of Biochemistry and Molecular Biology, Australian National University.

Wilson studied gus-a-bearing plasmids in plants.

== Education ==
Wilson completed her doctorate in Molecular Genetics at Harvard University and holds a Bachelor of Arts with First Class Honours from Cambridge University. Wilson was born in a small village in the United Kingdom called Shipton (or Shipton-by-Beningbrough) just outside York.
