= Dogs in Canada =

Print magazine by the Canadian Kernel Club

- The June 2005 edition of Dogs in Canada
- Founded: 1889
- First issue: February 1889
- Final issue: 2012
- Company: Apex Publishing, Ltd.
- Country: Canada
- Language: English

Dogs in Canada was a print magazine published by the Canadian Kennel Club (CKC) from 1889 to 2012. The publication went through different title changes, starting with Canadian Kennel Gazette, then Kennel and Bench, and finally Dogs in Canada. Issues were published monthly, along with an annual edition.

== History ==
Founded in 1889, Dogs in Canada was one of the oldest continually published magazines in Canada. It began as a newsletter by Apex Publishing Ltd., a subsidiary of the Canadian Kennel Club. The magazine originally focused purely on pedigree dogs and dog shows.

Due to a change in editorial direction, Dogs in Canada abandoned its focus on dog breeding and became a general-interest dog magazine aimed at pet owners.

In 2011, the Canadian Kennel Club decided to close its publishing arm, Apex Publishing Ltd., citing the worsening financial state of the publishing industry. The December 2011 edition and 2012 annual were the final publications of Dogs in Canada.

== Contents ==
Dogs in Canada published the columns reporting on subjects such as nutrition, behavior, health basics, breed lines, and letters to the editor. Features mainly focused on animal health and welfare, sporting activities, human-animal bond, travel and lifestyle, and breeding history and arts.
