= Sarah Kate Wilson =

American electrical engineer

Sarah Kate (Katie) Wilson is an American electrical engineer focusing on communications, including channel estimation for orthogonal frequency-division multiplexing and optical wireless communications She is a professor emerita in the Department of Electrical and Computer Engineering at Santa Clara University in California.

== Education and career ==
Wilson majored in mathematics at Bryn Mawr College, graduating in 1979. After working in industry as a computer programmer and engineer, she returned to graduate study in electrical engineering at Stanford University, earning a master's degree in 1987 and completing her Ph.D. in 1994.

She became an assistant professor in electrical engineering at Purdue University in 1994, and in 1999 moved to the Luleå University of Technology in Sweden. After several years alternating between industry work and academic research in Sweden and California, she joined the faculty at Santa Clara University in 2006. She served as president of the university's faculty senate from 2018 to 2019.

From 2009 to 2011 she was editor-in-chief of IEEE Communications Letters. She founded the IEEE Women's Workshop on Communications and Signal Processing in 2012, and has served in multiple other leadership roles in the IEEE Communications Society.

== Recognition ==
Wilson was elected as an IEEE Fellow in 2014, "for contributions to orthogonal frequency division multiplexing". In the same year, she was the recipient of the IEEE Communications Society Women in Communication Engineering Outstanding Service Award. She was the 2017 recipient of the IEEE Communications Society Joseph LoCicero Award for Exemplary Service to Publications, and the 2018 recipient of the IEEE Education Society Harriett B. Rigas Award, "for excellence and outstanding leadership in signal processing, education, and mentoring".
