= Palm Beach Daily News =

Newspaper in Palm Beach, Florida

- The March 11, 2009 front page of The Palm Beach Daily News
- Type: Daily newspaper
- Format: Broadsheet
- Owner: USA Today Co.
- Publisher: Tim Burke
- Editor: Carol Rose
- Founded: 1897 as Lake Worth Daily News
- Headquarters: 2751 S. Dixie Highway, West Palm Beach, FL 33405
- Circulation: 3,019
- OCLC number: 55506588
- Website: palmbeachdailynews.com

The Palm Beach Daily News is a newspaper serving the town of Palm Beach in Palm Beach County in South Florida. It is also known as "The Shiny Sheet" because of its heavy, slick newsprint stock.

== History ==
The newspaper was founded in 1897 as the Lake Worth Daily News, and it covers the news and social affairs of the residents on the island of Palm Beach itself. Previously owned by Cox Enterprises, it has been a sister publication of The Palm Beach Post since 1948, when Florida newspaper owner John Perry, owner of The Post, bought the Daily News as well. Cox acquired all of Perry's properties in the Palm Beaches in 1969.

On October 31, 2017, Cox Media Group announced its plans to sell the Palm Beach Daily News and Palm Beach Post. In 2018, it was announced that GateHouse Media would buy the newspapers for $49.25 million, with the deal closed in May.

== See also ==
- List of newspapers in Florida
