= National Register of Historic Places listings in Palm Beach County, Florida =

Location of Palm Beach County in Florida

This is a list of the National Register of Historic Places listings in Palm Beach County, Florida.

This is intended to be a complete list of the properties and districts on the National Register of Historic Places in Palm Beach County, Florida, United States. The locations of National Register properties and districts for which the latitude and longitude coordinates are included below, may be seen in a map.

There are 75 properties and districts listed on the National Register in the county, including 2 National Historic Landmarks. Another 5 properties were once listed on the Register but have been removed.

This National Park Service list is complete through NPS recent listings posted November 13, 2026.

Contents: Counties in Florida (non-linked contain no National Register listings)
Alachua - Baker - Bay - Bradford - Brevard - Broward - Calhoun - Charlotte - Citrus - Clay - Collier - Columbia - DeSoto - Dixie - Duval - Escambia - Flagler - Franklin - Gadsden - Gilchrist - Glades - Gulf - Hamilton - Hardee - Hendry - Hernando - Highlands - Hillsborough (Tampa) - Holmes - Indian River - Jackson - Jefferson - Lafayette - Lake - Lee - Leon - Levy - Liberty - Madison - Manatee - Marion - Martin - Miami-Dade (Miami) - Monroe - Nassau - Okaloosa - Okeechobee - Orange - Osceola - Palm Beach - Pasco - Pinellas - Polk - Putnam - St. Johns - St. Lucie - Santa Rosa - Sarasota - Seminole - Sumter - Suwannee - Taylor - Union - Volusia - Wakulla - Walton - Washington

== Current listings ==
| | Name on the Register | Image | Date listed | Location | City or town | Description |
|---|---|---|---|---|---|---|
| 1 | Administration Buildings | Administration Buildings | June 27, 1985 (#85001372) | Dixie Highway and Camino Real; 26°20′24″N 80°05′22″W | Boca Raton | Built by Addison Mizner. |
| 2 | Fred C. Aiken House | Fred C. Aiken House | September 24, 1992 (#92001271) | 801 Hibiscus Street; 26°21′10″N 80°06′10″W | Boca Raton | |
| 3 | American National Bank Building | American National Bank Building | October 8, 1997 (#97001217) | 114 South Olive Avenue; 26°42′42″N 80°03′12″W | West Palm Beach | |
| 4 | Old Belle Glade Town Hall | Old Belle Glade Town Hall | October 8, 2014 (#14000827) | 33 W. Ave. A 26°41′10″N 80°40′08″W | Belle Glade | |
| 5 | Big Mound City | | May 24, 1973 (#73000596) | Address Restricted | Canal Point | |
| 6 | Boca Raton Fire Engine No. 1 | Boca Raton Fire Engine No. 1 | November 1, 2001 (#01001195) | 100 South Ocean Boulevard; 26°20′59″N 80°04′13″W | Boca Raton | |
| 7 | Boca Raton Old City Hall | Boca Raton Old City Hall | October 16, 1980 (#80000958) | 71 North Federal Highway; 26°21′03″N 80°05′13″W | Boca Raton | Houses Boca Raton History Museum and Welcome Center. Original design by Addison Mizner. |
| 8 | Boynton School | Boynton School | March 7, 1994 (#94000139) | 141 East Ocean Avenue; 26°31′38″N 80°03′48″W | Boynton Beach | |
| 9 | Boynton Woman's Club | Boynton Woman's Club | April 26, 1979 (#79000686) | 1010 South Federal Highway; 26°31′07″N 80°03′30″W | Boynton Beach | |
| 10 | Breakers Hotel Complex | Breakers Hotel Complex | August 14, 1973 (#73000598) | South County Road; 26°42′54″N 80°02′02″W | Palm Beach | |
| 11 | Central Park Historic District | Central Park Historic District | July 28, 1999 (#99000898) | Roughly along State Road 805 and South Olive Avenue from Monroe Drive to Southern Boulevard; 26°40′37″N 80°03′06″W | West Palm Beach | |
| 12 | Clematis Street Historic Commercial District | Clematis Street Historic Commercial District | October 8, 1998 (#98001230) | 500 block of Clematis Street; 26°42′47″N 80°03′22″W | West Palm Beach | |
| 13 | College Park Historic District | College Park Historic District | February 9, 2001 (#01000078) | Roughly bounded by Maryland Drive, North Federal Highway, 19th Avenue North, and North Dixie Highway; 26°38′24″N 80°03′17″W | Lake Worth | |
| 14 | Comeau Building | Comeau Building | September 6, 1996 (#96000975) | 319 Clematis Street; 26°42′48″N 80°03′09″W | West Palm Beach | |
| 15 | Alfred J. Comeau House | Alfred J. Comeau House | March 24, 2000 (#00000238) | 701 Flamingo Drive; 26°41′46″N 80°03′32″W | West Palm Beach | |
| 16 | Delray Beach Schools | Delray Beach Schools | March 10, 1988 (#88000210) | Block 68; 26°27′45″N 80°04′21″W | Delray Beach | |
| 17 | Eastover | Eastover | December 23, 2002 (#02001694) | 1100 South Ocean Boulevard; 26°34′13″N 80°02′25″W | Manalapan | |
| 18 | El Cid Historic District | El Cid Historic District | August 31, 1995 (#95001064) | Roughly bounded by Flamingo Drive, South Flagler Drive, Dyer Road, and South Dixie Highway; 26°41′31″N 80°03′05″W | West Palm Beach | |
| 19 | J. B. Evans House | J. B. Evans House | March 28, 2002 (#02000265) | 142 South Ocean Boulevard; 26°27′29″N 80°03′35″W | Delray Beach | |
| 20 | Ferndix Building | Ferndix Building | July 22, 1999 (#99000861) | 401 Fern Street; 26°42′38″N 80°03′15″W | West Palm Beach | |
| 21 | Henry Morrison Flagler House: Whitehall | Henry Morrison Flagler House: Whitehall | December 5, 1972 (#72000345) | Whitehall Way; 26°42′49″N 80°02′38″W | Palm Beach | |
| 22 | Flamingo Park Historic Residential District | Flamingo Park Historic Residential District | July 14, 2000 (#00000785) | Roughly bounded by Park Place, Parker Avenue, Belvedere Road, and Florida Avenue; 26°41′33″N 80°03′38″W | West Palm Beach | |
| 23 | Florida East Coast Railway Passenger Station | Florida East Coast Railway Passenger Station | October 24, 1980 (#80000959) | Off State Road 808; 26°20′33″N 80°05′21″W | Boca Raton | Houses Boca Express Train Museum. |
| 24 | Grandview Heights Historic District | Grandview Heights Historic District | July 8, 1999 (#99000795) | Roughly bounded by Park Place, Alabama Avenue, M Street, and South Lake Avenue; 26°42′00″N 80°03′29″W | West Palm Beach | |
| 25 | Guaranty Building | Guaranty Building | December 10, 1998 (#98001483) | 120 South Olive Avenue; 26°42′44″N 80°03′04″W | West Palm Beach | |
| 26 | Gulf Stream Hotel | Gulf Stream Hotel | January 11, 1983 (#83001435) | 1 Lake Avenue; 26°36′55″N 80°02′56″W | Lake Worth | |
| 27 | Hatch's Department Store | Hatch's Department Store | April 14, 1994 (#94000348) | 301-307 Clematis Street; 26°42′49″N 80°03′08″W | West Palm Beach | |
| 28 | Historic Old Town Commercial District | Historic Old Town Commercial District | September 22, 2001 (#01001011) | Bounded by FEC, M Street, Lucerne Avenue, and 1st Avenue S 26°36′56″N 80°03′11″W | Lake Worth | |
| 29 | House at 1240 Cocoanut Road | House at 1240 Cocoanut Road | August 17, 2001 (#01000888) | 1240 Cocoanut Road; 26°19′56″N 80°04′36″W | Boca Raton | |
| 30 | Hurricane of 1928 African American Mass Burial Site | Hurricane of 1928 African American Mass Burial Site | September 12, 2002 (#02001012) | Junction of 25th Street and Tamarind Avenue; 26°44′09″N 80°03′42″W | West Palm Beach | |
| 31 | Jupiter Inlet Historic and Archeological Site | Jupiter Inlet Historic and Archeological Site | November 5, 1985 (#85003486) | Address Restricted | Jupiter | |
| 32 | Jupiter Inlet Lighthouse | Jupiter Inlet Lighthouse | October 15, 1973 (#73000597) | Junction of the Loxahatchee River and Jupiter Sound; 26°56′50″N 80°04′47″W | Jupiter | |
| 33 | Kelsey City City Hall | Kelsey City City Hall | September 3, 1981 (#81000195) | 535 Park Avenue; 26°47′57″N 80°04′17″W | Lake Park | |
| 34 | Lavender House | Lavender House | February 24, 1995 (#95000165) | 875 Alamanda Street; 26°21′04″N 80°06′15″W | Boca Raton | |
| 35 | Lofthus (shipwreck) | Lofthus (shipwreck) | January 6, 2004 (#03001363) | ¾ mile north of Boynton Inlet, 175 yards offshore 26°33′47″N 80°02′23″W | Boynton Beach | |
| 36 | Loxahatchee Battlefield | Loxahatchee Battlefield | April 5, 2024 (#100007672) | 9060 Indiantown Rd. 26°55′52″N 80°10′37″W | Jupiter | |
| 37 | Mango Promenade Historic District | Mango Promenade Historic District | July 8, 1999 (#99000801) | Roughly bounded by South Dixie Highway, Austin Lane, Coconut Lane, and Cranesnest Way; 26°41′51″N 80°03′12″W | West Palm Beach | |
| 38 | Mar-a-Lago National Historic Landmark | Mar-a-Lago National Historic Landmark | December 23, 1980 (#80000961) | 1100 South Ocean Boulevard; 26°40′40″N 80°02′10″W | Palm Beach | |
| 39 | Marina Historic District | Marina Historic District | June 2, 2014 (#14000268) | Bounded by E. Atlantic Ave., Marine Way, SE 4th Str, SE 7th Ave. 26°27′30″N 80°03′56″W | Delray Beach | |
| 40 | Mickens House | Mickens House | April 11, 1985 (#85000769) | 801 4th Street; 26°43′02″N 80°03′36″W | West Palm Beach | |
| 41 | Milton-Myers American Legion Post No. 65 | Milton-Myers American Legion Post No. 65 | April 20, 1995 (#95000471) | 263 Northeast 5th Avenue; 26°27′57″N 80°04′05″W | Delray Beach | |
| 42 | Northboro Park Historic District | Northboro Park Historic District | February 20, 2007 (#07000059) | Bounded by 40th N., Flagler Drive, 36th Street, and Broadway; 26°44′51″N 80°03′16″W | West Palm Beach | |
| 43 | Northwest Historic District | Northwest Historic District | January 22, 1992 (#91002005) | Roughly bounded by Tamarind Avenue, Eleventh Street, Rosemary Avenue, and Third Street; 26°43′09″N 80°03′34″W | West Palm Beach | |
| 44 | Ann Norton House and Sculpture Gardens | Ann Norton House and Sculpture Gardens | July 26, 1990 (#90001106) | 253 Barcelona Road; 26°41′42″N 80°03′03″W | West Palm Beach | Formerly just "Norton House"; a boundary increase and renaming were approved April 11, 2025. |
| 45 | Old Lake Worth City Hall | Old Lake Worth City Hall | May 18, 1989 (#89000432) | 414 Lake Avenue; 26°36′57″N 80°03′18″W | Lake Worth | |
| 46 | Old Northwood Historic District | Old Northwood Historic District | April 14, 1994 (#94000368) | Roughly bounded by Broadway, North Dixie Highway, and 26th and 35th Streets; 26°44′28″N 80°03′17″W | West Palm Beach | |
| 47 | Old Lucerne Historic Residential District | Old Lucerne Historic Residential District | June 4, 2001 (#01000526) | Roughly along North Lakeside Drive, North Palmway Street, and North O Street, from Lake Avenue to 7th Avenue, N. 26°37′10″N 80°03′04″W | Lake Worth | |
| 48 | Old Palm Beach Junior College Building | Old Palm Beach Junior College Building | May 30, 1991 (#91000601) | 813 Gardenia Avenue; 26°42′34″N 80°03′38″W | West Palm Beach | |
| 49 | Old School Square Historic District | Old School Square Historic District | March 14, 2018 (#100002095) | Bounded by Lake Ida Rd. NE 1st Ave., SW 2nd St. & N Swinton Ave. 26°27′48″N 80°04′21″W | Delray Beach | |
| 50 | Old West Palm Beach National Guard Armory | Old West Palm Beach National Guard Armory | June 11, 1992 (#92000142) | 1703 South Lake Avenue; 26°41′53″N 80°03′41″W | West Palm Beach | |
| 51 | Osborne School | Osborne School | August 1, 2003 (#03000701) | 1718 South Douglas Street; 26°35′39″N 80°03′22″W | Lake Worth | Part of the Florida's Historic Black Public Schools MPS |
| 52 | Pahokee High School | Pahokee High School | November 15, 1996 (#96001334) | 360 Main Street; 26°49′30″N 80°39′48″W | Pahokee | |
| 53 | Palm Beach Daily News Building | Palm Beach Daily News Building | December 24, 1985 (#85003121) | 204 Brazilian Avenue; 26°42′13″N 80°02′13″W | Palm Beach | |
| 54 | Palm Beach Hotel | Palm Beach Hotel | April 21, 2010 (#10000212) | 235-251 Sunrise Ave. 26°43′13″N 80°02′23″W | Palm Beach | |
| 55 | Palm Beach Mercantile Company | Palm Beach Mercantile Company | January 28, 1994 (#93001552) | 206 Clematis Street; 26°42′46″N 80°03′08″W | West Palm Beach | |
| 56 | Palm Beach Town Hall | Palm Beach Town Hall | January 28, 2005 (#04001571) | 360 South County Road; 26°42′09″N 80°02′12″W | Palm Beach | |
| 57 | Paramount Theatre Building | Paramount Theatre Building | December 12, 1973 (#73000599) | 145 North County Road; 26°43′09″N 80°02′14″W | Palm Beach | |
| 58 | Pearl City National Register Historic District | | December 7, 2023 (#100009609) | Bounded by NE 15th Terr., N. Federal Hwy, NE 10th St & N Dixie Hwy; 26°21′44″N 80°05′01″W | Boca Raton | |
| 59 | Pine Ridge Hospital | Pine Ridge Hospital | January 26, 2001 (#00001675) | 1401 Division Avenue; 26°43′31″N 80°03′39″W | West Palm Beach | |
| 60 | Professional Building | Professional Building | October 24, 1996 (#96001187) | 310 South Dixie Highway; 26°42′39″N 80°03′13″W | West Palm Beach | |
| 61 | Prospect Park-Southland Park Historic District | Prospect Park-Southland Park Historic District | April 8, 2011 (#11000181) | Bounded by Lake Worth, S Dixie HWY, Monceaux Rd, Monroe Dr, 26°41′03″N 80°03′05″W | West Palm Beach | |
| 62 | Clifton Rice House | Clifton Rice House | April 26, 1996 (#96000466) | 714 Claremore Drive; 26°41′40″N 80°03′34″W | West Palm Beach | |
| 63 | Royal Poinciana Way Historic District | Royal Poinciana Way Historic District | September 17, 2015 (#15000588) | Bounded by 207-283 Royal Poinciana Way, 95-118 N. Cty. Rd. 184-280; 26°43′06″N 80°02′22″W | Palm Beach | |
| 64 | Seaboard Air Line Dining Car-6113 | Seaboard Air Line Dining Car-6113 | April 5, 2001 (#01000334) | 747 South Dixie Highway; 26°20′32″N 80°05′22″W | Boca Raton | Florida's Historic Railroad Resources MPS |
| 65 | Seaboard Air Line Lounge Car-6603 | Seaboard Air Line Lounge Car-6603 | April 5, 2001 (#01000335) | 747 South Dixie Highway; 26°20′32″N 80°05′22″W | Boca Raton | Florida's Historic Railroad Resources MPS |
| 66 | Seaboard Airline Railroad Station | Seaboard Airline Railroad Station | September 4, 1986 (#86002172) | 1525 West Atlantic Avenue; 26°27′49″N 80°05′27″W | Delray Beach | |
| 67 | Seaboard Coastline Railroad Passenger Station | Seaboard Coastline Railroad Passenger Station | June 19, 1973 (#73000600) | Tamarind Avenue at Datura Street; 26°42′44″N 80°03′44″W | West Palm Beach | |
| 68 | John and Elizabeth Shaw Sundy House | John and Elizabeth Shaw Sundy House | January 16, 1992 (#91001910) | 106 South Swinton Avenue; 26°27′33″N 80°04′25″W | Delray Beach | |
| 69 | US Post Office | US Post Office | July 21, 1983 (#83001436) | 95 North County Road; 26°43′05″N 80°02′18″W | Palm Beach | |
| 70 | Grant Van Valkenburg House | Grant Van Valkenburg House | August 2, 1999 (#99000860) | 213 Rosemary Avenue; 26°42′41″N 80°03′26″W | West Palm Beach | |
| 71 | Vedado Historic District | Vedado Historic District | October 15, 2010 (#10000821) | Roughly bounded Merril Ave, Southern Blvd, Parker Ave & Paseo Morella; 26°40′39″N 80°03′54″W | West Palm Beach | |
| 72 | Via Mizner | Via Mizner | April 1, 1993 (#93000256) | 337-339 Worth Avenue; 26°42′04″N 80°02′26″W | Palm Beach | |
| 73 | Vineta Hotel | Vineta Hotel | August 21, 1986 (#86001724) | 363 Cocoanut Row; 26°42′10″N 80°02′28″W | Palm Beach | |
| 74 | William Gray Warden House | William Gray Warden House | August 1, 1984 (#84000940) | 112 Seminole Avenue; 26°43′17″N 80°02′08″W | Palm Beach | |
| 75 | West Palm Beach Fishing Club | West Palm Beach Fishing Club | June 13, 2016 (#16000360) | 201 5th St. 26°43′05″N 80°03′03″W | West Palm Beach | |

== Former listings ==
| | Name on the Register | Image | Date listed | Date removed | Location | City or town | Description |
|---|---|---|---|---|---|---|---|
| 1 | Bingham-Blossom House | Bingham-Blossom House | December 5, 1972 (#72000344) | January 4, 2012 | 1250 South Ocean Boulevard; 26°40′19″N 80°02′28″W | Palm Beach | Demolished in 1984. |
| 2 | Brelsford House | Brelsford House | May 3, 1974 (#74000653) | January 4, 2012 | 1 Lake Trail; 26°42′35″N 80°02′16″W | Palm Beach | Demolished in August 1975 |
| 3 | Dixie Court Hotel | Dixie Court Hotel | August 21, 1986 (#86001723) | January 4, 2012 | 301 North Dixie Highway; 26°43′10″N 80°03′13″W | West Palm Beach | Demolished in 1990. |
| 4 | Hibiscus Apartments | Hibiscus Apartments | May 10, 1984 (#84000935) | January 4, 2012 | 619 Hibiscus Street; 26°42′31″N 80°03′30″W | West Palm Beach | Destroyed by fire May 1, 1989. Macy's built on site. |
| 5 | Palm Beach Winter Club | | August 1, 1980 (#80000960) | January 4, 2012 | U.S. Route 1; 26°49′34″N 80°03′43″W | North Palm Beach | Demolished in 1984. |

== See also ==
- History of Palm Beach County, Florida
- List of National Historic Landmarks in Florida
- National Register of Historic Places listings in Florida
