= Clematis Street Historic Commercial District =

Historic district in Florida, United States

- U.S. National Register of Historic Places
- U.S. Historic district
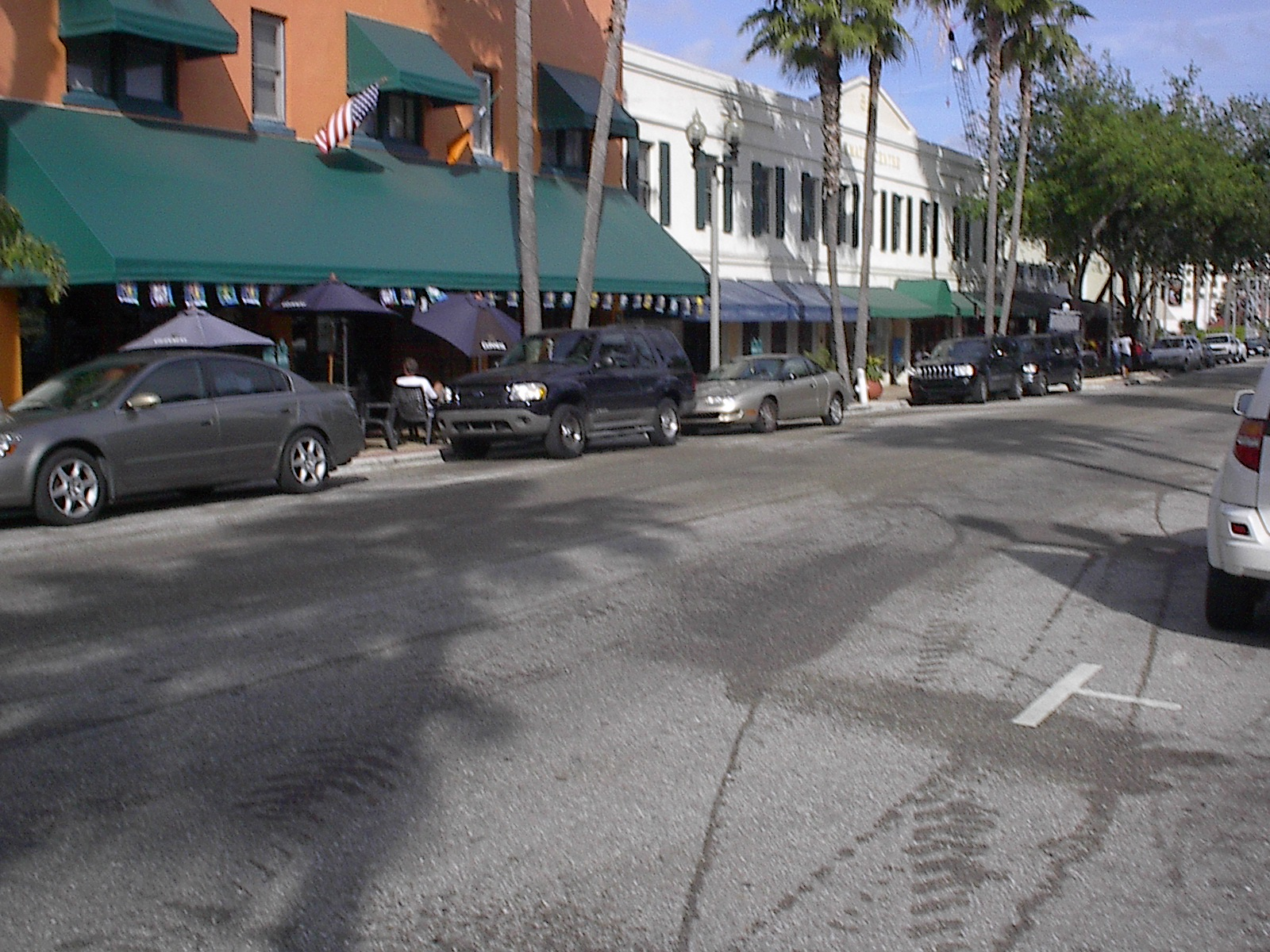
- Looking east along the north side of the 500 block of Clematis Street.

- Location within Florida Location within the United States
- Location: West Palm Beach, Florida
- Coordinates: 26°42′47″N 80°3′22″W
- Area: less than 1-acre (4,000 m^{2})
- NRHP reference No.: 98001230
- Added to NRHP: October 8, 1998

The Clematis Street Historic Commercial District is a U.S. historic district (designated as such on October 8, 1998) located in West Palm Beach, Florida. The district runs along the 500 Block of Clematis Street. It contains 12 historic buildings.

== History ==
Early in the history of West Palm Beach, Clematis Street (then Clematis Avenue) became the city's "Main Street", with several businesses located along the east end of the street by the mid-1890s. While the eastside of Clematis Street grew rapidly into the 1900s decade, it would not be until the 1910s when commerce began expanding westward across the Florida East Coast Railway. A city directory from 1916 indicates that several grocery and mercantile businesses and homes existed in the 500 block of Clematis Street section. The Campbell Building, located at 535 Clematis Street, opened in January 1918 and is the oldest surviving structure in the district. Five stores soon occupied the first floor of the Campbell Building. The Fashion Store opened at 502 Clematis Street in November 1918, although it was demolished prior to the area's designation as a historic district. By 1919, The Palm Beach Post frequently reported on real estate speculation within Clematis Street's 500 block, with property prices rapidly increasing. Near the end of the year, Raymond C. Ketcham opened a dry goods store at 522 Clematis Street.

By 1920, prices for front property along the west end of Clematis Street averaged $400 per foot. Soon, decreasing construction costs and a land boom allowed property prices to continue to soar. The western portion of the street had become a "very desirable place to live and work" by the early 1920s, with the section possessing its own electrical and ice plants while also being located near the water and gas plants. The decade saw the completion of 10 out of 12 of the district's contributing properties, including Gruner's Department Store in 1920, St. James Rooming House and the W.E. Pope Building in 1921, Hotel Clematis and Suther's Market in 1922, the Jennings Building in 1924, the Sirkin Building in 1925, Sewell Hardware and 540 Clematis Street in 1928, and 517-519 Clematis Street in 1929. However, the end of the land boom and the beginning of the Great Depression left nine buildings vacant in the 500 block of Clematis Street alone by the end of the year. More buildings were vacated and construction along Clematis Street ceased as economic turmoil persisted.

A number of buildings in the 500 block of Clematis Street were demolished through the late 1990s. This included every building east of 513 Clematis Street, all structures west of 533-535 Clematis Street, and the building situated between 528-530 Clematis Street and 540 Clematis Street. On October 8, 1998, the Clematis Street Historic Commercial District officially became a listing on the National Register of Historic Places (NRHP), with 12 structures at the 500 block of Clematis Street being considered contributing and another being non-contributing. Two other structures have been demolished since the area was listed on the NRHP in 1998 – Hotel Clematis at 512 Clematis Street and Gruner's Department Store at 516 Clematis Street.

== Structures ==
=== Contributing ===
Twelve structures within the 500 block of Clematis Street are listed as contributing to the historic commercial district:

- Building at 512 Clematis Street. Also known as Hotel Clematis, this Mediterranean Revival style building was constructed in 1922. The two-story building featured seven bays, with three on the first floor and four on the second floor. However, this building has been demolished since the 1998 designation of the historic district, as an open lot now occupies the 512 Clematis Street site.
- Building at 516 Clematis Street. Designed by William O. Newlon and Thomas H. Stephens and completed in 1920, this building became known as Gruner's Department Store. The establishment was founded by Offin P. Gruner, who owned two other businesses in the 500 block of Clematis Street – the Fashion Store and Gruner's Dixie Cleaning and Tailoring. However, this building was also demolished post-1998 NRHP designation.
- 513-515 Clematis Street (St. James Rooming House)
- 517-519 Clematis Street
- 518-520 Clematis Street (Jennings Building)
- 522 Clematis Street (R.C. Ketcham Dry Goods)
- 525 Clematis Street (Campbell Building)
- 526 Clematis Street (Suther's Market)
- 528-530 Clematis Street
- Building at 531 Clematis Street. Named the W.E. Pope Building, this masonry vernacular structure was built around 1921. Originally constructed with one floor, the building was design in such a way to accommodate additional floors as necessary, with a second-story erected four years later. The structure has been occupied by O'Shea's Irish Pub since 1997. Between 1949 and 1997, the building's tenant was Bill's Tuxedo Rentals, which served notable clients including Robert and John F. Kennedy and some cast members of the B.L. Stryker show.
- Building at 533-535 Clematis Street. Also known as the Sirkin Building, this Renaissance Revival style structure is considered "the most architecturally significant building in the historic district". Harry Sirkin, a department store owner, hired the Harvey and Clarke architectural firm to design this three-story building, constructed in 1925 at a cost of $60,000.
- Building at 540 Clematis Street. A masonry vernacular structure built in 1928.

=== Non-contributing and others ===
- Building at 505 and 509 Clematis Street. Currently occupied by a Subculture Coffee shop located at the base of the multi-storied Clematis Parking Garage. This structure is not listed as being part of the historic commercial district.
- Building at 528A Clematis Street. Despite being constructed in 1923, the time period of the contributing structures, this building has been significantly altered and retains few of its former features. Therefore, it is listed as a non-contributing structure.

== See also ==
- National Register of Historic Places listings in Palm Beach County, Florida
- Other National Register of Historic Places listings on Clematis Street:
  - Comeau Building
  - Hatch's Department Store
  - Palm Beach Mercantile Company
