= Central Park Historic District =

Central Park Historic District may refer to:

in the United States

(by state then city)

- Central Park Historic District (West Palm Beach, Florida), listed on the NRHP in Florida
- Central Park-North Main Street Historic District, Charles City, Iowa, listed on the NRHP in Iowa
- Central Park Historic District (Hannibal, Missouri), listed on the NRHP in Missouri
- Central Park, New York, NY, listed as a historic district on the NRHP in New York City
- Central Park West Historic District, New York, NY, listed on the NRHP in New York City
- Central Park Historic District (Two Rivers, Wisconsin), listed on the NRHP in Wisconsin
