= Boca Raton station =

Boca Raton station can refer to:

- Boca Raton station (Tri-Rail), a Tri-Rail commuter rail station in Boca Raton, Florida
- Boca Raton station (Brightline), a Brightline inter-city rail station in Boca Raton, Florida
- Boca Express Train Museum, a historic Florida East Coast Railway station in Boca Raton, Florida
