= Old Palm Beach Junior College Building =

- U.S. National Register of Historic Places
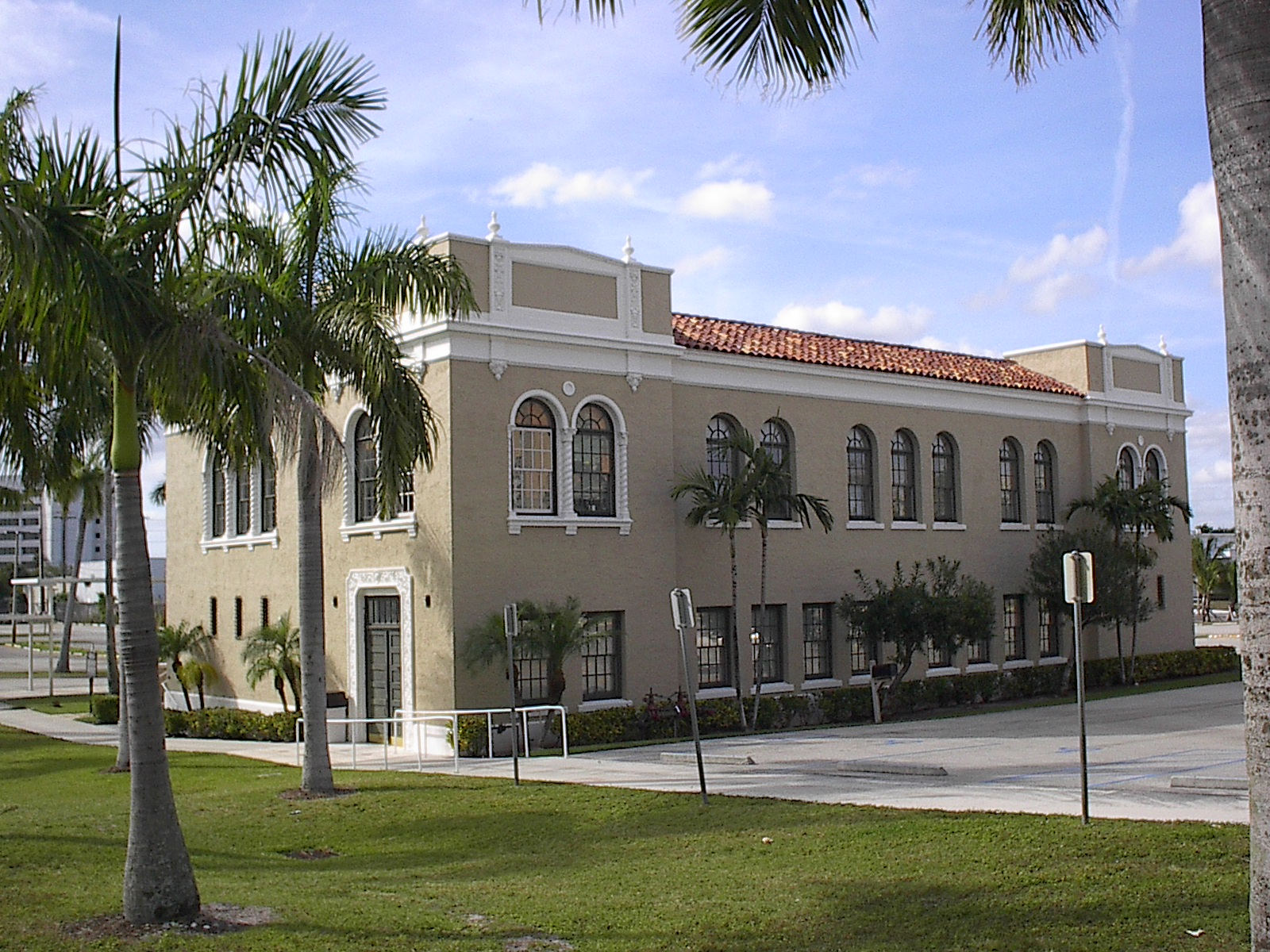
- The original Palm Beach Junior College Building is located on the campus of Dreyfoos School of the Arts, and is used by Palm Beach State College.

- Location within Florida Location within the United States
- Location: West Palm Beach, Florida
- Coordinates: 26°42′34″N 80°3′38″W
- NRHP reference No.: 91000601
- Added to NRHP: May 30, 1991

The Old Palm Beach Junior College Building (also known as the Science/Manual Training Building at Old Palm Beach High School) is a historic school building in West Palm Beach, Florida. A two-story, Mediterranean Revival and masonry-style structure, it is located at 813 Gardenia Avenue, on the campus of the Dreyfoos School of the Arts. As the name implies, the building served as the science and manual training building at Palm Beach High School (now Palm Beach Lakes Community High School) until 1933, when Palm Beach Junior College (PBJC; now known as Palm Beach State College) opened, becoming the first public junior college in Florida.

After PBJC relocated to the Lake Park Town Hall, the building reverted to being used by Palm Beach High School. On May 30, 1991, the Old Palm Beach Junior College Building was added to the U.S. National Register of Historic Places. Currently, the structure houses the Palm Beach State College Foundation.

== History and description ==
In 1927, Palm Beach High School's (now known as Palm Beach Lakes Community High School) fourth building was constructed, a 2-story, Mediterranean Revival and masonry-style structure located at 813 Gardenia Avenue. Designed by local architect William Manly King, the structure was originally used as the science/manual training building. Thus, this structure is also known as the Science/Manuel Training Building at Old Palm Beach High School. Julie T. Taylor of the Florida Bureau of Historic Preservation and Sarah B. Brack of Palm Beach Community College (previously known as Palm Beach Junior College and later as Palm Beach State College) noted in 1991 that, "its tower-like, parapeted, corner pavilions; arched windows; barrel tile roof; precast, decorative, architectural details and rusticated stucco exterior finish contribute to its stylistic character, which reflects the prevailing influence of Florida Boom period in which it was originally built."

Several private junior colleges (also known as two-year colleges) opened in Florida in the early 20th century, although they struggled financially and depended on support from churches and civic organizations. Further, nearly all established before 1930 operated in North Florida. However, in 1933, Palm Beach Junior College (PBJC) opened within this structure, now known as the Old Palm Beach Junior College Building, with funding from the Palm Beach County School Board. Therefore, PBJC was the first public junior college established in Florida. PBJC then began receiving state funding in 1947.

PBJC moved out of the building in 1948, reverting the structure to its original purpose of educating high school students. The college relocated to the then-recently decommissioned Morrison Field (now known as the Palm Beach International Airport), to the Lake Park City Hall in the early 1950s because Morrison Field was reactivated for the Korean War, and finally to the present site of its main campus in Lake Worth Beach in 1956. Since then, the college has added four campuses and been renamed twice, to Palm Beach Community College in 1988 and then Palm Beach State College (PBSC) in 2010.

Palm Beach High School closed in the late 1980s, by which time it was known as Twin Lakes High School. In 1990, Dreyfoos School of the Arts, originally called the Palm Beach County School of the Arts, opened at the site of the Palm Beach/Twin Lakes High School. On May 30, 1991, the Old Palm Beach Junior College Building was added to the U.S. National Register of Historic Places. PBSC currently owns the structure, using it to house the Palm Beach State College Foundation.

== See also ==
- National Register of Historic Places listings in Palm Beach County, Florida
