= Ferndix Building =

- U.S. National Register of Historic Places
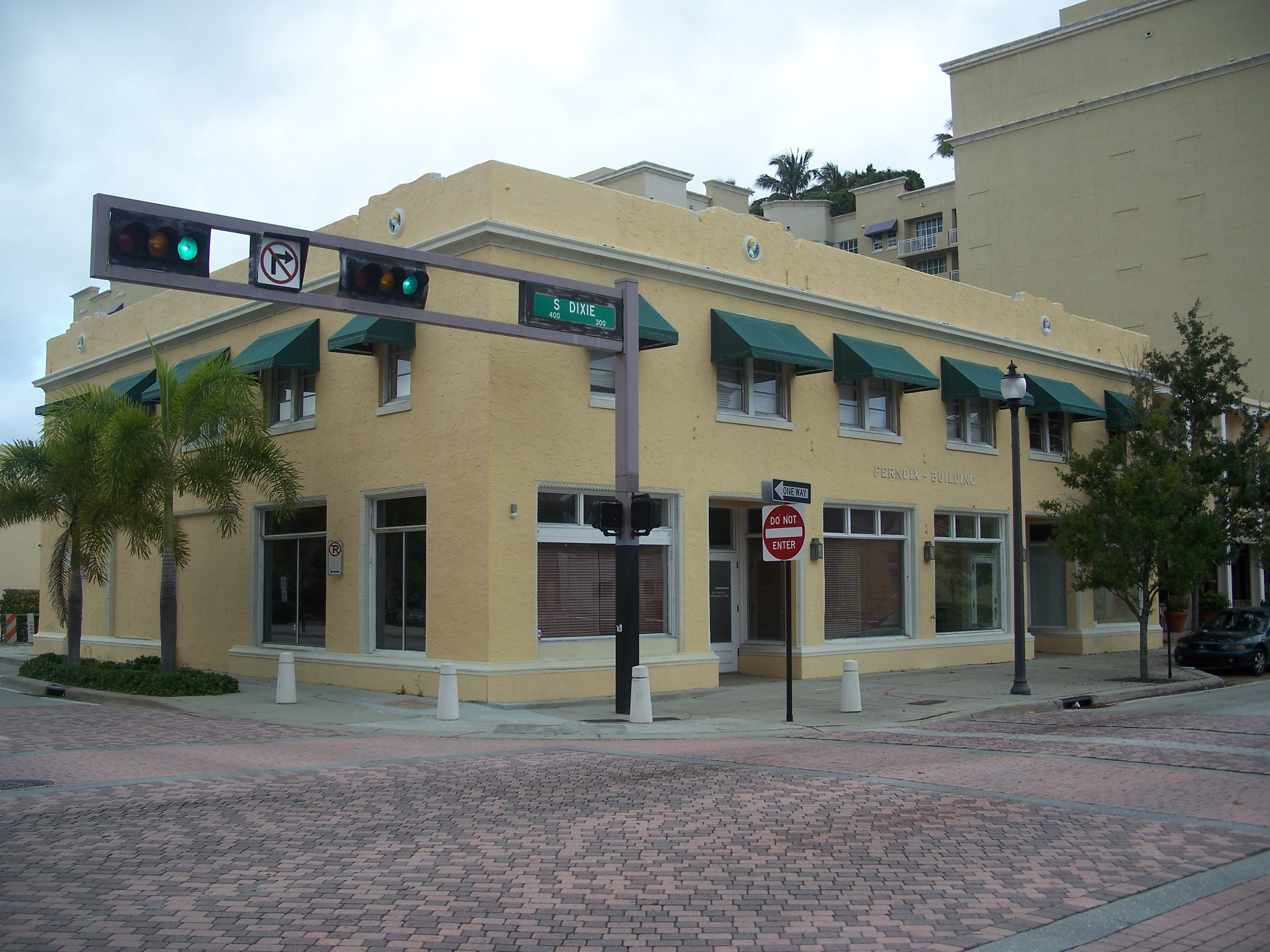

- Location within Florida Location within the United States
- Location: West Palm Beach, Florida
- Coordinates: 26°42′38″N 80°3′15″W
- Architectural style: Mission/Spanish Revival
- NRHP reference No.: 99000861
- Added to NRHP: July 22, 1999

The Ferndix Building is a historic site at 401 Fern Street, sometimes listed as 321 South Dixie Highway, in West Palm Beach, Florida, United States. A two-story commercial structure of Mission/Spanish Revival architecture, the building was envisioned around 1924 by David Forest "D.F." Dunkle, a developer and former mayor of West Palm Beach. As a commercial structure, the building has been occupied by several businesses, including a hotel from 1925 to the mid-1940s. On July 22, 1999, the Ferndix Building was listed on the National Register of Historic Places.

== History and description ==
Ferndix is a portmanteau of Fern Street and S. Dixie Highway, the intersection in West Palm Beach where the Ferndix Building is located. The 1920s Florida land boom brought many new businesses to the city, including the Professional Building just to the northeast around 1921. In September 1924, The Palm Beach Post reported on plans to construct a commercial building that would "supplant an old home on lot 10, block 19, at Dixie Highway and Fern Street," conceptualized by developer, Guaranty Company president, and former West Palm Beach Mayor David Forest "D.F." Dunkle. Earlier in the decade, nearly all structures in that section of West Palm Beach were residential.

Between 1924 and 1925, Wilcox Brothers Construction Co. built the Ferndix Building, whose address is sometimes listed as 321 South Dixie Highway or 401 Fern Street. A Mission/Spanish Revival-style structure, the Ferndix is "a two-story, six-bay wide by four-bay deep building constructed of hollow clay tile covered with smooth stucco. It sits on a continuous concrete foundation and is topped by a flat roof," according to Janet G. Murphy and Barbara Mattick of the Florida Bureau of Historic Preservation. The second floor served as a lodging facility known as the Ferndix Hotel. A department of a local Western Union location moved into the Ferndix Building in 1928 due to its main building on Clematis Street suffering severe damage from a hurricane. Until that year, Dunkle was both the owner and lessor of the Ferndix Building. He then suffered significant financial losses as the land boom ceased and the Great Depression started.

F.B. Pablicke and Eola Improvement Company purchased the property in 1929, but a legal dispute persisted for several years. Eventually, the latter acquired the Ferndix Building in 1935 for $14,000. Although the structure was nearly vacant in 1930 except for the hotel and a pharmacy, the building acquired several other businesses and a stable number of tenants later in the decade. The hotel's name changed to Central Hotel in 1931 and then Southland Hotel in 1933. However, from 1946 to 1947, architect Dillard Duff and construction workers converted the hotel into apartments. On July 22, 1999, the Ferndix Building was listed on the National Register of Historic Places. Lawrence Corning renovated the structure by the following January. Corning used the building as an art gallery, before selling the Ferndix Building to the Corradino Group in 2002 for $700,000. This led to another legal dispute between Corning, the Corradino Group, and the owners of a restaurant on the first floor. Currently, the Ferndix Building is occupied by Bliss Beauty Lounge.

== See also ==
- National Register of Historic Places listings in Palm Beach County, Florida
