= Hatch's Department Store =

- U.S. National Register of Historic Places
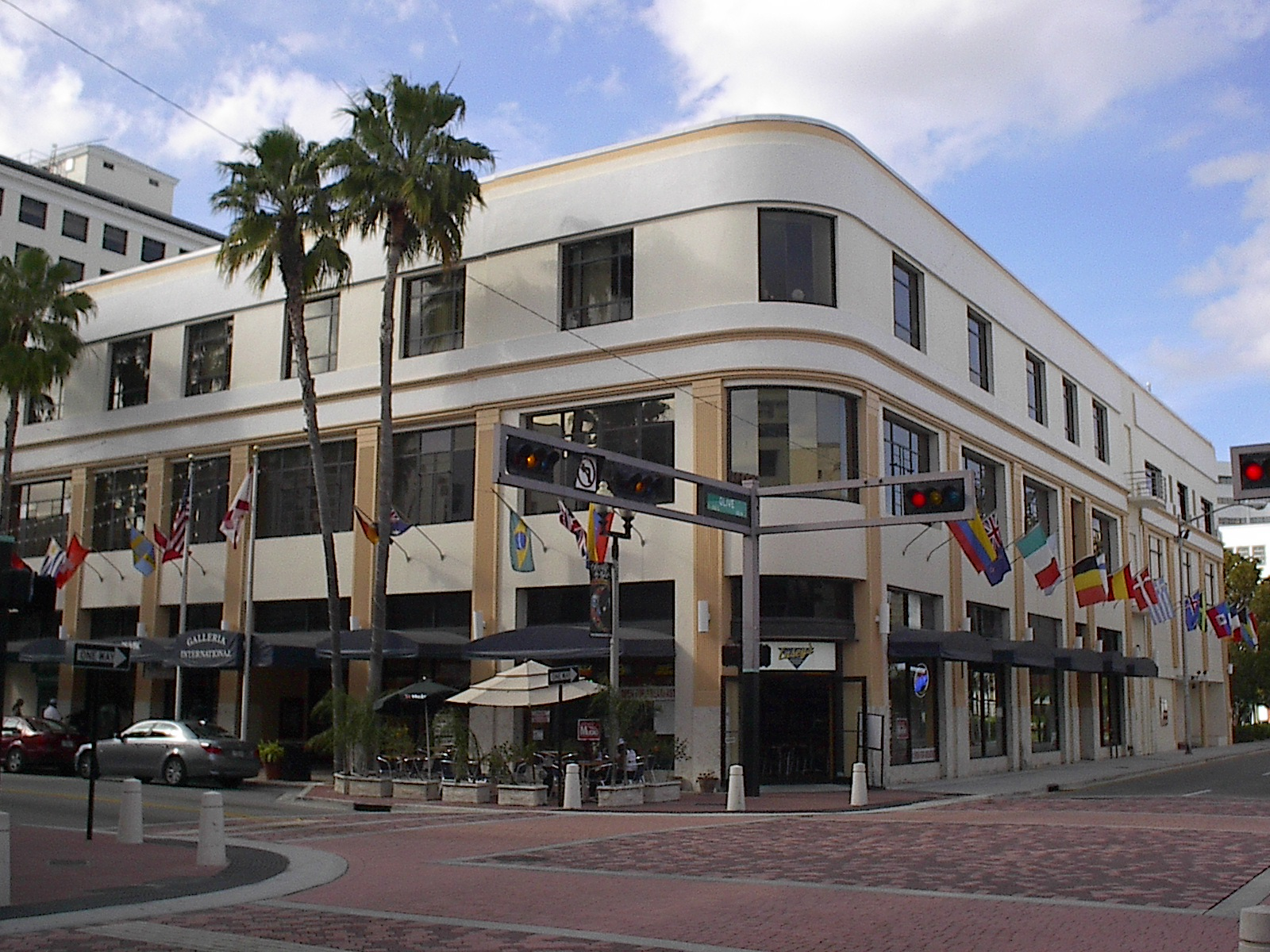

- Location within Florida Location within the United States
- Location: West Palm Beach, Florida
- Coordinates: 26°42′49″N 80°3′8″W
- Built: 1903, 1915
- Architect: John L. Volk
- Architectural style: Masonry Vernacular with Moderne elements
- NRHP reference No.: 94000348
- Added to NRHP: April 14, 1994

Hatch's Department Store is a historic U.S. building in West Palm Beach, Florida. The name is derived from businessman George Hatch, who moved to the city in 1911 and purchased the Palm Beach Dry Goods Company. It is located at 301-307 Clematis Street. Originally two separate buildings, Hatch's Department Store was unified as one structure by architect John L. Volk and contractor C.J. Trevail in 1936. A Masonry Vernacular structure with Moderne elements, the store served as a Burdines location from 1941 until they relocated to the Palm Beach Mall in 1979, leaving downtown West Palm Beach without a department store for about 20 years. On April 14, 1994, Hatch's Department Store was added to the U.S. National Register of Historic Places.

== History and description ==
The namesake of the building is George Hatch, who had experience in working at a dry goods business due to his father operating a mercantile store in the late 1870s in Rockledge, Florida. After running a store with N. P. Yowell in Orlando for about six years, Hatch moved to West Palm Beach in 1911 and purchased the Palm Beach Dry Goods Company. He and Yowell managed this retail outlet, renamed Hatch's Department Store, along Clematis Street near the waterfront. Hatch himself later described this first location as "just about half built up. The structures were just crude frame buildings." Hatch's Department Store was then moved to 307 Clematis Street in 1915.

The building where Hatch's Department Store is located in, 301-307 Clematis Street, was originally two structures – one erected in 1903 (known as the Italianate Metcalf Building) and the other in 1915 – that were later unified. Hatch's Department Store expanded significantly a few times in the 1920s due to structural changes, including the addition of a mezzanine and incorporating 305 Clematis Street's commercial bay. The unification of the buildings occurred in 1936, planned by architect John L. Volk and contracted to C.J. Trevail. Volk's designs completely gutted the interior and resulted in minor changes to external walls. These changes led Hatch's Department Store becoming a Masonry Vernacular structure with Moderne elements.

In April 1941, Burdines purchased the structure to use it as a store. Under the ownership of Burdines, new windows and internal features were added. A Belk's department store also opened there in 1954. The 1950s and 1960s marked significant development of the suburbs of West Palm Beach, including the establishment of the Palm Beach Mall. Consequently, Burdines relocated from Hatch's Department Store in 1979 to there. Downtown West Palm Beach would not have another department store until a Macy's location opened at CityPlace in 2000. A Designers and Decorators Center operated at 301-307 Clematis Street after Burdines migrated to the Palm Beach Mall, but they also ultimately moved out and were replaced by banks and offices. On April 14, 1994, Hatch's Department Store was added to the National Register of Historic Places.

== See also ==
- National Register of Historic Places listings in Palm Beach County, Florida
