= Mango Promenade Historic District =

Historic district in Florida, United States

- U.S. National Register of Historic Places
- U.S. Historic district
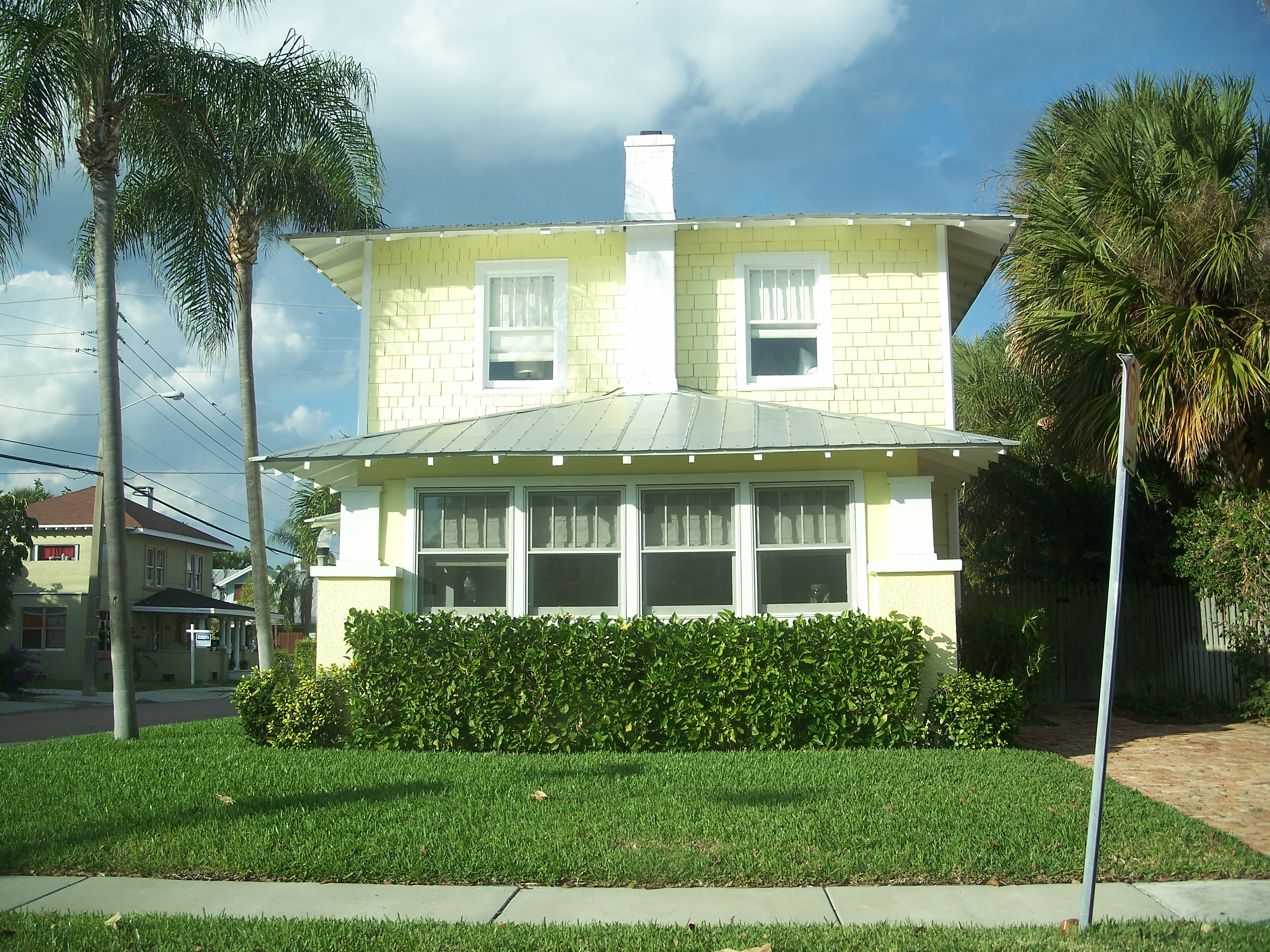

- Location within Florida Location within the United States
- Location: West Palm Beach, Florida
- Coordinates: 26°41′57″N 80°03′12″W
- Area: 300 acres (1.2 km^{2})
- NRHP reference No.: 99000801
- Added to NRHP: July 8, 1999

The Mango Promenade Historic District is a U.S. historic district (designated as such on July 8, 1999) located in West Palm Beach, Florida. The district is bounded by South Dixie Highway, Austin Lane, Coconut Lane, and Cranesnest Way. It contains 125 historic buildings.

== History ==
In 1875, Benjamin Lanehart became one of the first non-indigenous residents along the western shore of the Lake Worth Lagoon, settling near the north end of the present-day El Cid Historic District. Lanehart's homestead, primarily used for producing pineapples, extended from modern-day Okeechobee Boulevard southward to Belvedere Road by the following year. This land encompassed the Mango Promenade Historic District. However, local pioneer pineapple growers went out of business by the early 20th century due to pineapple diseases and increasing competition from Cuba. The oldest contributing and surviving structure – 318 Cranesnest Way – dates back to approximately 1910. Several other surviving homes in the district were built later in the 1910s.

The initial platting of the Mango Promenade Historic District occurred in 1913, at which time "the area began to change from a collection of large parcels into a pedestrian oriented neighborhood of single-family homes.", according to the district's National Register of Historic Places (NRPH) nomination form. Bror J. Carlberg, a West Palm Beach Chamber of Commerce charter member, filed that plat on November 18, 1913, in an area stretching from Poinsettia Street (South Dixie Highway) and Olive Street (South Olive Avenue) along Vallette Way. Carlberg extended the plat on March 31, 1914, adding Wildermere Road, and again on August 31 of that year, expanding Vallette Way east of Olive Street. Frederick M. Delavan, Minnie Josephine Anderson, and Bertha Falkenstein followed suit on October 2, 1914, filing a plat that included Sophia Drive and Victoria Road. Another plat was filed on February 27, 1917 by William Kuehner and F. L. Crane and encompassed the vicinity of Cranesnest Way. Palm Beach Realty Service, Inc. filed a plat on October 29, 1919, which included Croton Way.

Another plat was filed by the Matthams Park Corporation on May 15, 1924, which led to the development of Austin Lane and Tuxedo Lane, as well as a pedestrian walkway referred to as Orange Court. By 1926, about 89% of homes within the Mango Promenade Historic District had been built. Thereafter, the Great Depression almost completely halted further local construction, until President Franklin D. Roosevelt approved the Banking Act and Homeowners Refinancing Act. The Baldwin-Nichols Subdivision – Queens Court – became the final plat filed in the district in July 1936.

The Palm Beach Post noted that by the 1980s, the neighborhood had "only a reputation for an abundance of rundown houses plagued by crime and owned by absentee landlords." However, significant revitalization had occurred by the mid-1990s. Consequently, city commissioners designated the neighborhood as a local historic district in 1995, while it was later listed in the NRHP on July 8, 1999.

A bungalow at 1605 South Olive Avenue, constructed in 1919, fell into disrepair. Its owner, Palm Beach Atlantic University (PBA), obtained a permit from the city to demolish the dwelling and did so on January 21, 2008. An attorney for PBA claimed that full-scale preservation work would cost approximately $500,000. However, the West Palm Beach Historic Preservation Board accused PBA of making only superficial repairs on the structure while it was still standing and essentially neglected the home to justify its demolition. The board requested that a special magistrate investigate the demolition of the home, as PBA may have violated the "demolition by neglect" clause of West Palm Beach's preservation law, which includes a maximum fine of $15,000. In lieu of paying the fine, PBA agreed during negotiations with special magistrate Gary Brandenburg to spend the same amount to repaint the seven other historic residences in the district owned by the university. Residents of the Mango Promenade Historic District have also, at times, objected to the expansion of the Norton Museum of Art at least back to 2001, with the museum acquiring all homes on the north side of Cranesnest Way from 1992 until then.

== Flamingo Business District and Flamingo Park ==
The Mango Promenade Historic District also includes a section of the Flamingo Business District and one contributing site, Flamingo Park, both adjacent to South Dixie Highway. Royal Palm Realty Company president W. Harold Wilson platted a subdivision called Flamingo Park on May 11, 1921. Much of this subdivision became the Flamingo Park Historic Residential District, but the eastern edge is now part of the Mango Promenade Historic District. In 1951, the business district was defined as stretching from Okeechobee Boulevard to Belvedere Road. Workplaces of the Flamingo Business District listed within the Mango Promenade Historic District are located between the 1600 and 1900 blocks of South Dixie Highway. Of the nine contributing commercial structures, seven are of masonry vernacular and the other two are of Mediterranean revival styles of architecture, with all constructed from around 1920 until 1940.

Chris and Melanie Hill, owners of Kofski Antiques in Palm Beach, spent approximately $300,000 between 2003 and early 2004 to restore the Dove Building, a masonry vernacular structure built in 1925 at 1910 South Dixie Highway. However, in February 2004, the building shifted, severing a waterpipe and causing a 1 ft (0.30 m) crack to form in the façade. Due to significant damage, city constructed workers suggested that the building may have to be demolished, which occurred on March 20.

In 1884, George L. Marsteller purchased an 80 acres (32 ha) parcel of land for $100, part of which covers the site now occupied by the municipal Flamingo Park. From 1902 to 1921, the site served as Lakeside Cemetery, a burial place for African Americans, and has been a municipal park since 1921. The Lakeside Cemetery Association purchased land for a cemetery for $300 in 1902. The city unsuccessfully attempted to seize the land in 1913 to sell it to Henry Flagler for $1,200. Records indicated that approximately 100 people were buried in the cemetery between 1902 and 1913, with no evidence of the relocation of these bodies after the cemetery closed in 1921.
