= Clifton Rice House =

Historic house in Florida, United States

- U.S. National Register of Historic Places
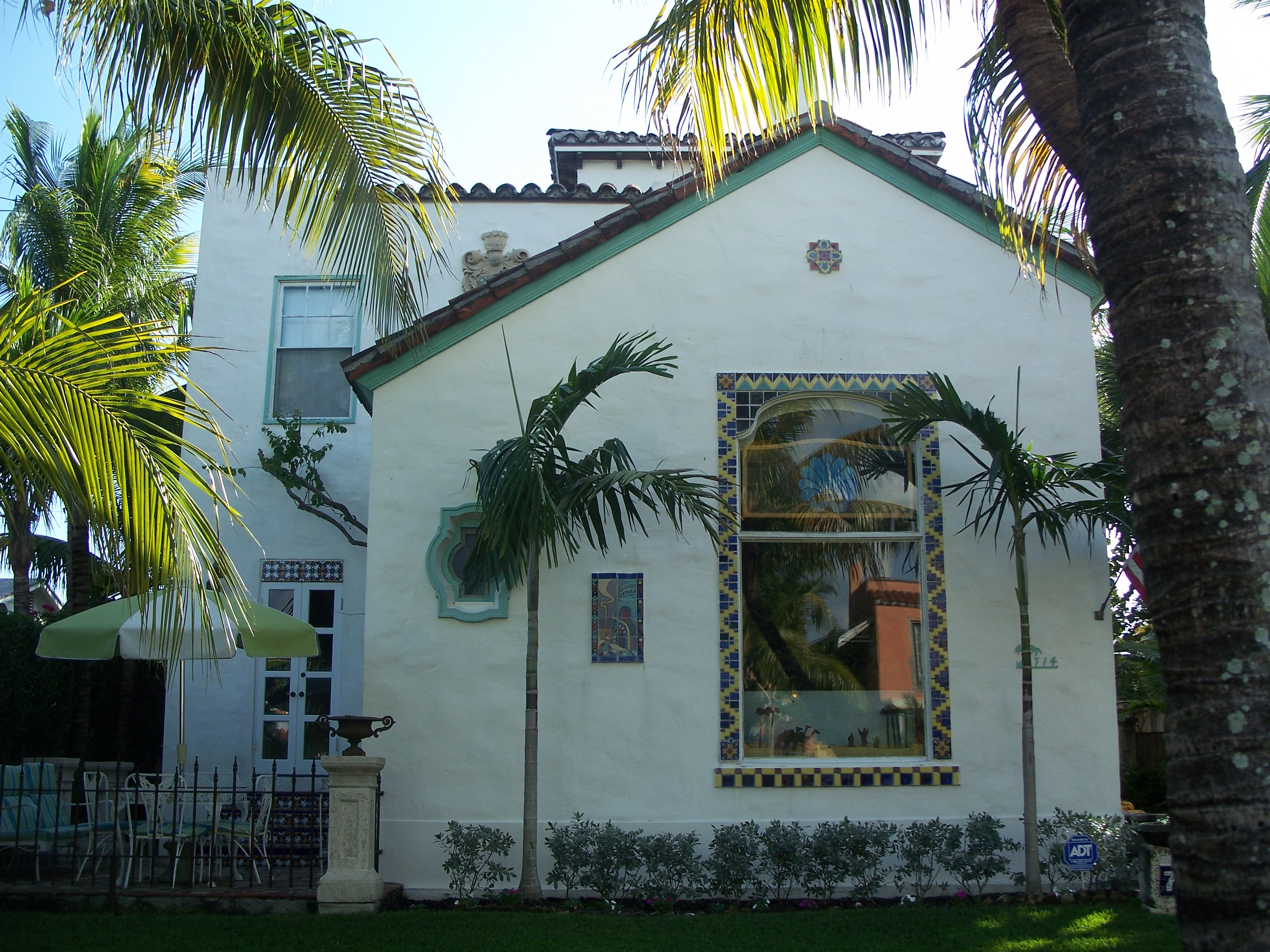

- Location within Florida Location within the United States
- Location: West Palm Beach, Palm Beach County, Florida
- Coordinates: 26°41′40″N 80°3′34″W
- Architectural style: Mission/Spanish Revival
- NRHP reference No.: 96000466
- Added to NRHP: April 26, 1996

The Clifton Rice House is a historic house located at 714 Claremore Drive in West Palm Beach, Florida.

== Description and history ==
It was added to the National Register of Historic Places on April 26, 1996, and is a contributing property to the Flamingo Park Historic Residential District.
