= Jeffrey Epstein's Palm Beach mansion =

House of Jeffrey Epstein in Palm Beach

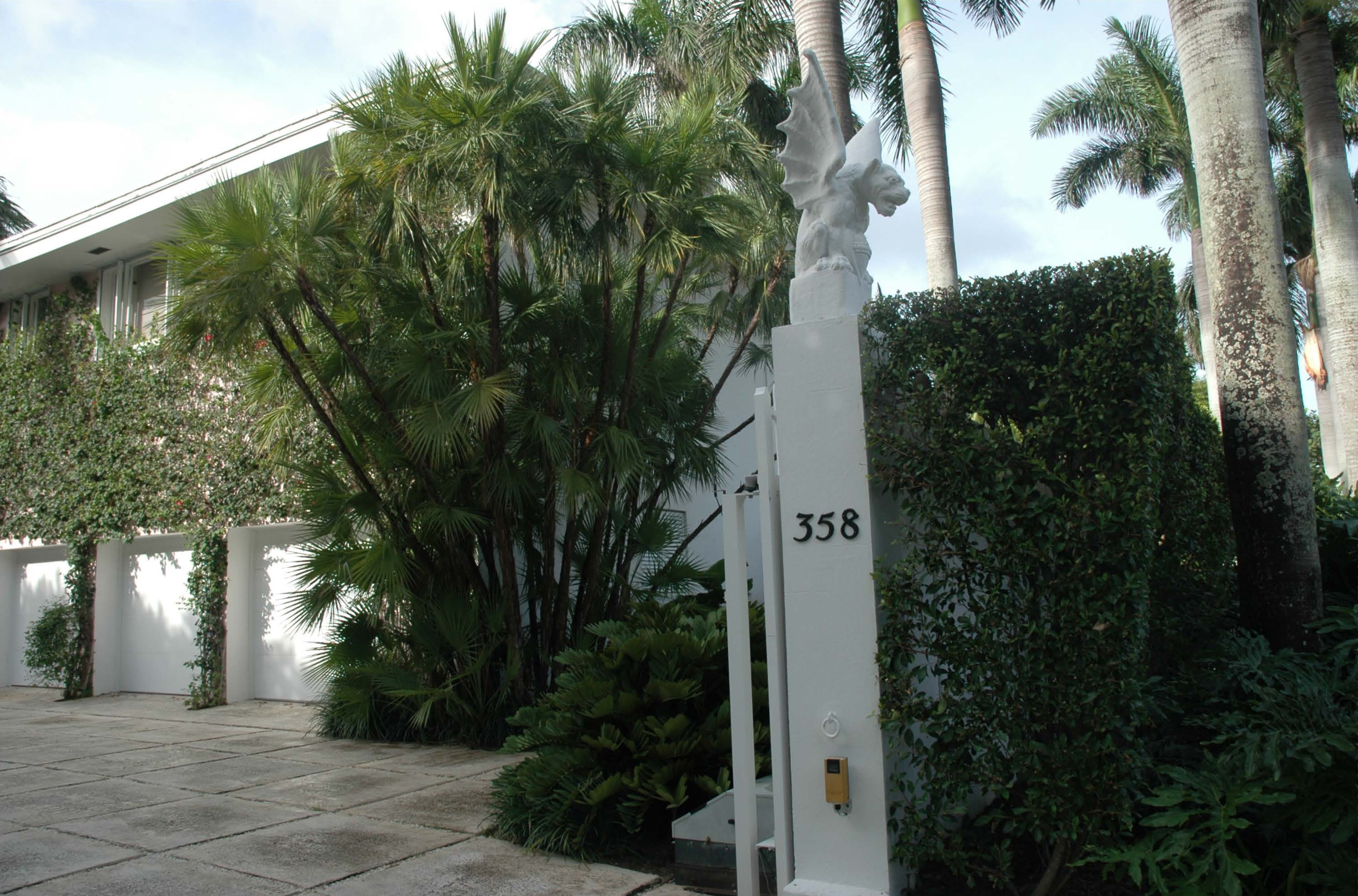
- A photograph taken during the police search of the mansion in 2005
- Interactive map of the Jeffrey Epstein's Palm Beach mansion area

General information
- Architectural style: West Indies
- Location: 358 El Brillo Way, Palm Beach, Florida, United States
- Coordinates: 26.6934°N 80.0386°W
- Completed: 1952
- Demolished: 2021
- Owner: Jeffrey Epstein

Technical details
- Size: 14,000 sq ft
- Floor count: 2

Design and construction
- Architect: John L. Volk

Jeffrey Epstein owned a large waterfront mansion in Palm Beach, Florida, United States, with the address 358 El Brillo Way. It became notorious as the site of his child sexual abuse. In 2005, the property was searched by Palm Beach police, launching what became known as the ongoing Epstein scandal. It was demolished in 2021 due to its association with the Epstein scandal.

== History ==
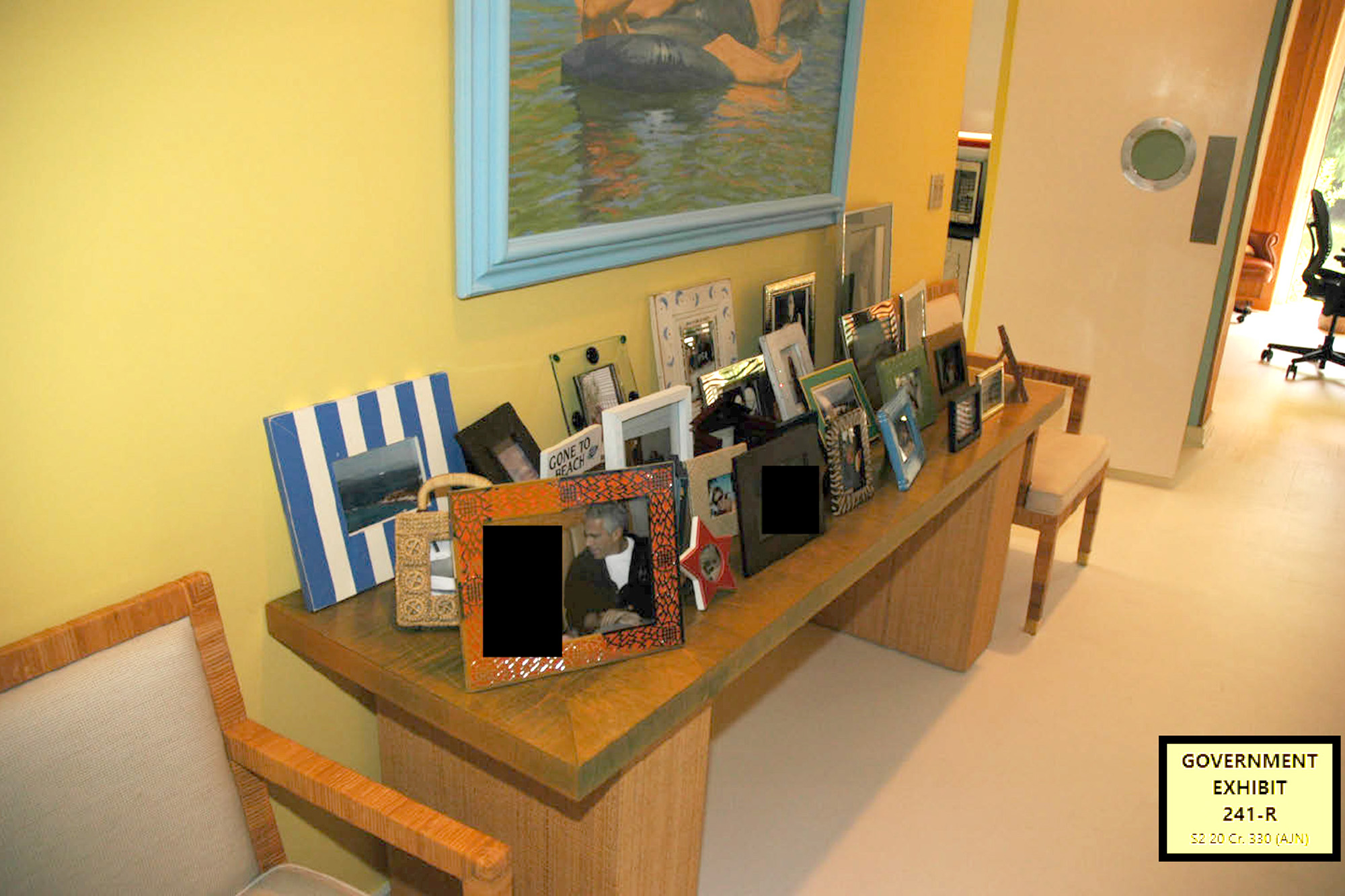
A photograph taken during the police search of the mansion in 2005

The house was built in 1952 in a West Indies style, designed by Palm Beach architect John L. Volk. Owen Ray Skelton, one of the founders of and a chief designer and engineer for Chrysler, owned the mansion until his death in Palm Beach in 1969. Epstein purchased the property in 1990 for $2.5 million.

In 2005, the property was searched by Palm Beach police, launching what became known as the Epstein scandal.

In 2013, Mette-Marit, Crown Princess of Norway stayed in the mansion for several days. She brought her personal guru to the mansion, which was called a "rape villa" in the media.

In February 2014, Epstein emailed an associate asking for "three motion detected hidden cameras" that could record video. The associate replied saying two such cameras had been purchased a day earlier from "the Spy Store in Fort Lauderdale" and the associate was "installing them into Kleenex boxes now." Abuse victims told police they feared they were being recorded.

=== Sale ===
After Epstein's death in August 2019 while awaiting trial, the mansion was sold by his estate for $18.5 million to property developer Todd Michael Glaser. Glaser applied to have the address changed to 360 El Brillo Way due to the mansion's notoriety, stating that "you can't imagine how many people drove down that dead-end street" to look at the house. Glaser found it impossible to sell the house.

=== Demolition and redevelopment ===
The mansion's infamy and irrevocable affiliation with Epstein and his crimes led to its demolition. In November 2020, a deal to demolish the mansion was agreed with it being finalized by December. Demolition began in April 2021 with Glaser overseeing the BG Group Demolition crew. He said, "Palm Beach is going to be very happy that it's gone". It was then sold as an empty lot. In 2022, the Palm Beach Architectural Commission approved plans for a new house to be built on site that would be two-story 10,000 square foot (929 m²) mansion. The new house was eventually built on site.

== See also ==
- Palm Beach Pete
