= John L. Volk =

American architect (1901–1984)

- Born: October 15, 1901; Graz, Austria
- Died: February 20, 1984 (aged 82); Freeport, Bahamas
- Education: Columbia University
- Occupation: Architect
- Spouse: Lillian Jane Kinney (married 1947-1984)

John Latham Volk (October 15, 1901 – February 20, 1984) was an Austrian-born American architect who designed public buildings and private residences in and around Palm Beach, Florida from the 1920s until his death in 1984. Although there is no particular style exclusively associated with Volk, he worked with many styles from Mediterranean Revival to Modern. Volk was among a group of architects considered the “Big Five,” along with Marion Sims Wyeth, Addison Mizner, Maurice Fatio, and Howard Major, who defined Palm Beach style in the early twentieth century.

== Early life and education ==
John L. Volk was born in Graz, Austria. His parents were John Volk (1878-1940) and Hedwig Cermely Volk (1882-1961). At the age of nine, Volk emigrated with his family to New York City and settled in New Rochelle, New York. Volk studied architecture at Columbia University and apprenticed with H.P. Knowles, a Masonic architect in New York where he worked as a draftsman and designer. After Knowles' death, Volk worked with Joseph H. Friedlander, another well-known New York architect.

== Palm Beach ==
After working on designs for the Rivoli and Capitol Theaters in New York, Volk came to Florida in 1925 with a commission to design a $1 million office building and bank in Key West. The deal fell apart due to the 1926 hurricane and the collapse of the Florida real estate boom. Volk, however, saw the opportunity for growth in Florida and decided to move to Palm Beach. By 1926, Volk had established his own practice in Palm Beach. Architect Gustav A. Maass joined as a partner from 1927 to 1937.

Volk's most significant commercial projects are the Royal Poinciana Plaza and additions and renovations to the First National Bank. Outstanding among his civic projects were the Parker Playhouse in Fort Lauderdale, the Royal Poinciana Playhouse, and additions and renovations to the Everglades Club and the Bath and Tennis Club. His residential projects ranged from estates for titans of the financial world to smaller homes in new subdivisions.

Volk was commissioned to design over 2,000 projects during his 60 years of practicing architecture in Palm Beach. His legacy can be found on almost every street in Palm Beach and throughout the United States and the Bahamas.

Volk's residence at South County Road, White Gables (1936), was one of the first Bermuda-style homes in Palm Beach. He lived there with his first wife, Beatrice Taylor Volk, for ten years. It was designated as a landmark in 1990. After divorcing Beatrice, Volk married Lillian Jane Kinney in 1947 and the couple resided in a house in Phipps Plaza. Jane was a recognized artist who was very involved in the social aspects of Palm Beach. She was also active in historic preservation and served as a chairman of the Landmarks Preservation Commission. The couple had one son in 1958, John Kinney Volk. Their residence in Phipps Plaza, known as Casa de los Arcos, was originally designed by architect Marion Sims Wyeth and remodeled by Volk. Because Casa de los Arcos was actually two buildings with an atrium connecting them, it served as both Volk's home and office.

In 2018, the John L. Volk Collection was donated to the Preservation Foundation of Palm Beach by John Volk Jr. The collection contains over 24,000 architectural drawings, 300 volumes from his personal library, 4,000 photographs, and a collection of Volk family correspondence and social history documentation.

== Projects ==
- Good Samaritan Hospital, West Palm Beach, Fla.
- Royal Poinciana Plaza, Palm Beach, Fla.
- Parker Playhouse, Fort Lauderdale, Fla.
- First National Bank, Palm Beach, Fla. (additions and renovations)
- Everglades Club, Palm Beach, Fla.
- Bath and Tennis Club, Palm Beach, Fla.
- White Gables, Palm Beach, Fla.
- La Ronda, Palm Beach, Fla. (demolished in 2004)
- Jeffery Epstein's mansion, Palm Beach, Fla.
