= Grant Van Valkenburg House =

Historic house in Florida, United States

- U.S. National Register of Historic Places
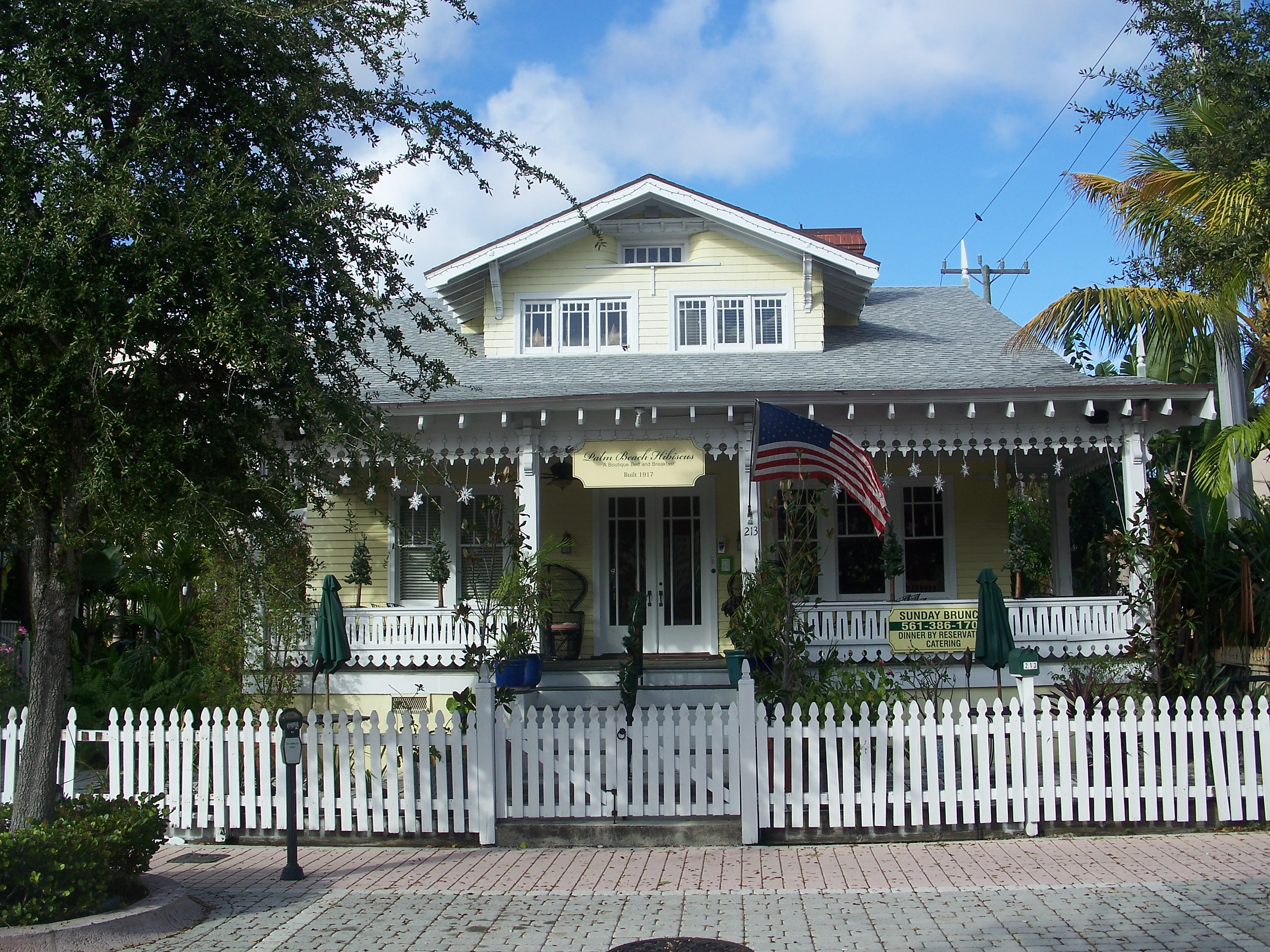

- Location within Florida Location within the United States
- Location: West Palm Beach, Palm Beach County, Florida
- Coordinates: 26°42′41″N 80°3′26″W
- Architectural style: Bungalow/Craftsman
- NRHP reference No.: 99000860
- Added to NRHP: August 2, 1999

The Grant Van Valkenburg House (also known as the Anderson House) is a historic home in West Palm Beach, Florida, United States. It is located at 213 Rosemary Avenue. It was added to the National Register of Historic Places in 1999.

It was deemed significant as "a fine example of a Craftsman bungalow with Victorian detailing. The 1 1/2-story, wood-frame dwelling sits on a raised concrete foundation and has a gabled roof with multi-planes and two gabled dormers, all with wide, overhanging eaves. The house is clad in three wood variations and has many decorative exterior features, including Victorian scroll-sawn woodwork. The interior of the Van Valkenburg House features many elements characteristic of Craftsman-style bungalows, including built-in furniture, leaded glass cabinet doors, wide baseboards, picture rails, coved ceilings, round arch openings, and carved woodwork. The house remains largely intact since its construction in 1918 and retains a high degree of architectural integrity. The house is architecturally significant as one of the last remaining Craftsman bungalows with Victorian detailing within the City of West Palm Beach."

The house was moved from 316 Hibiscus Street to its current location in 1996.
