= Kelsey City City Hall =

- U.S. National Register of Historic Places
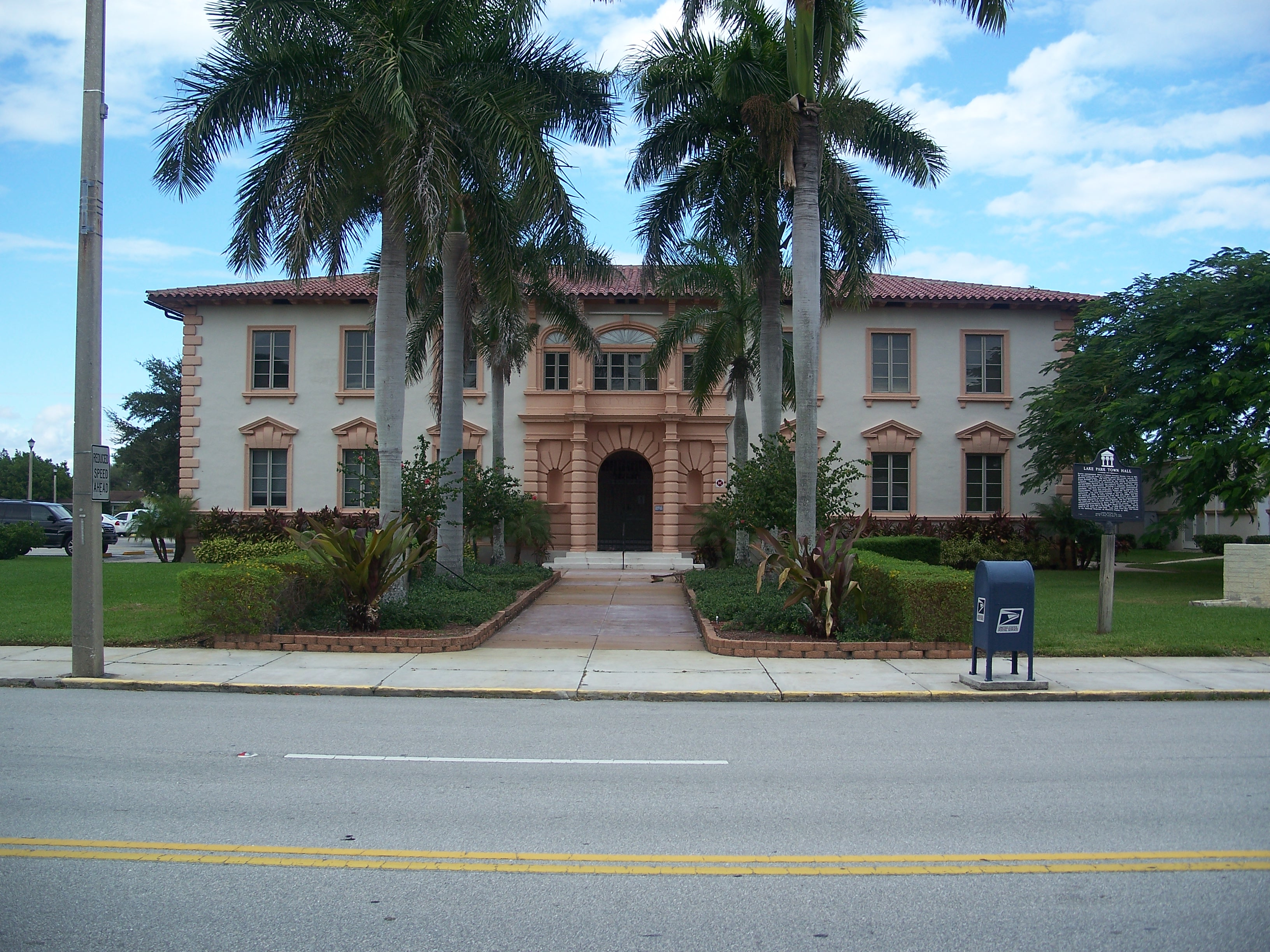

- Location within Florida Location within the United States
- Location: Lake Park, Florida
- Coordinates: 26°47′57″N 80°4′17″W
- NRHP reference No.: 81000195
- Added to NRHP: September 3, 1981

The Kelsey City City Hall (also known as the Lake Park Town Hall) is a historic site in Lake Park, Florida. The two-story, Mediterranean Revival Style building has served as city hall since opening in 1928, when the municipality was known as Kelsey City. It has undergone a few restorations, including as a project of the Works Progress Administration. More recently, a $15,281 matching grant was approved in 2025 for its renovation. The only remaining structure in Lake Park constructed in the 1920s, it is located at 535 Park Avenue. On September 3, 1981, Kelsey City City Hall was added to the U.S. National Register of Historic Places.

== History and description ==
A post office was established at Kelsey City (renamed Lake Park in 1939) in 1921, named after developer and restaurateur Harry S. Kelsey from Boston. Two years later, Kelsey City was incorporated as a town. He also developed Kelsey City after buying about 30,000 acres (12,000 ha) of land along the Lake Worth Lagoon and acquiring farmland nearby. However, Kelsey struggled financially after a series of hurricanes, the collapse of the 1920s Florida land boom, and the start of the Great Depression, leading him to sell many of his assets. With Kelsey City initially lacking a city hall, plans were completed in April 1927, drawn up by architect Bruce Kitchell of West Palm Beach. The Arnold Construction Company began erecting the building one month later.

The city hall was dedicated on January 6, 1928, located at 535 Park Avenue. Architecturally, the structure is of the Mediterranean Revival Style, while W. Carl Shiver of the Florida Division of Archives compared its motif to the Palazzo Thiene in Vicenza in northern Italy. A two-story structure, Kelsey City City Hall is an L-shaped building composed of bricks and clay tiles, while the external walls are made of stucco. In September 1928, the Okeechobee hurricane devastated Kelsey City. According to storm survivor Dick Wilson, some people sought shelter inside the city hall. To keep the doors from blowing off, refugees pushed a fire truck against the doors and took turns holding it there. The Palm Beach Post reported that on September 22, the city hall sheltered about 100 storm refugees.

In 1935, the Kelsey City City Hall, its ground, and a water tank were approved for a Works Progress Administration restoration project totaling $23,474. Palm Beach Junior College (PBJC; now Palm Beach State College) moved into the building in 1951. This required the college to cut the number of enrollments and staff. However, PBJC relocated in 1956 to a site that is now their main campus. On September 3, 1981, the Kelsey City City Hall was added to the National Register of Historic Places. About five years later, the Fort Lauderdale News noted that the structure is the only remaining one from the era when Kelsey prolifically developed the town. In 2025, the town of Lake Park was awarded a Small Matching grant of $15,281 from the Florida Department of State's Division of Historical Resources to restore the building.

== See also ==
- National Register of Historic Places listings in Palm Beach County, Florida
