= Prospect Park–Southland Park Historic District =

Historic district in Florida, United States

- U.S. National Register of Historic Places
- U.S. Historic district
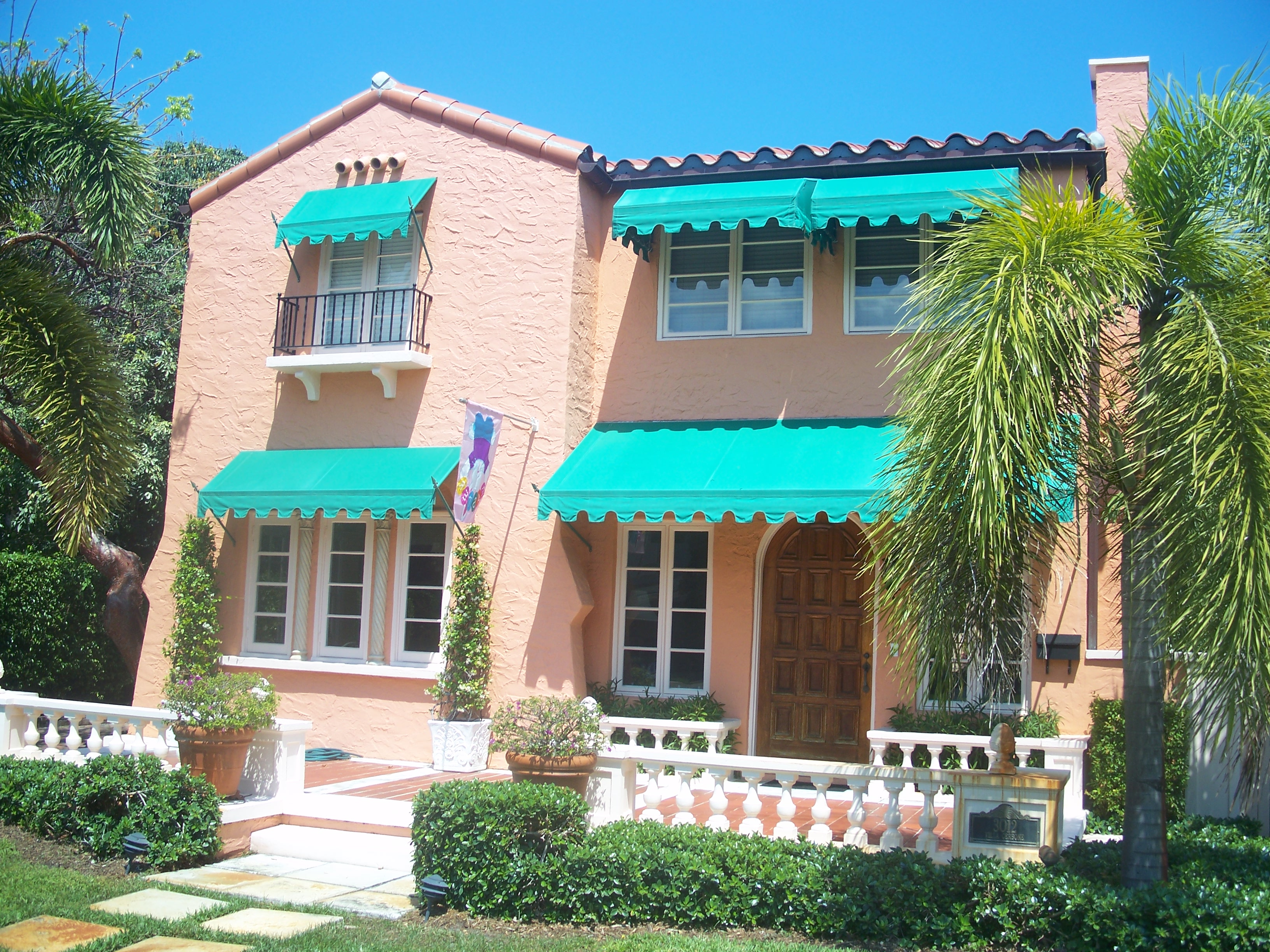
- Prospect Park–Southland Park Historic District

- Location within Florida Location within the United States
- Location: West Palm Beach, Florida
- Coordinates: 26°41′03″N 80°03′05″W
- NRHP reference No.: 11000181
- Added to NRHP: April 8, 2011

Prospect Park–Southland Park Historic District is a national historic district in West Palm Beach, Florida in Palm Beach County. Including buildings from 1922 to 1945, it is bounded by Lake Worth, S Dixie HWY, Monceaux Rd, and Monroe Dr.

It was added to the National Register of Historic Places in 2011.
