= Seaboard Air Line 6603 =

- Seaboard Air Line Lounge Car-6603
- U.S. National Register of Historic Places
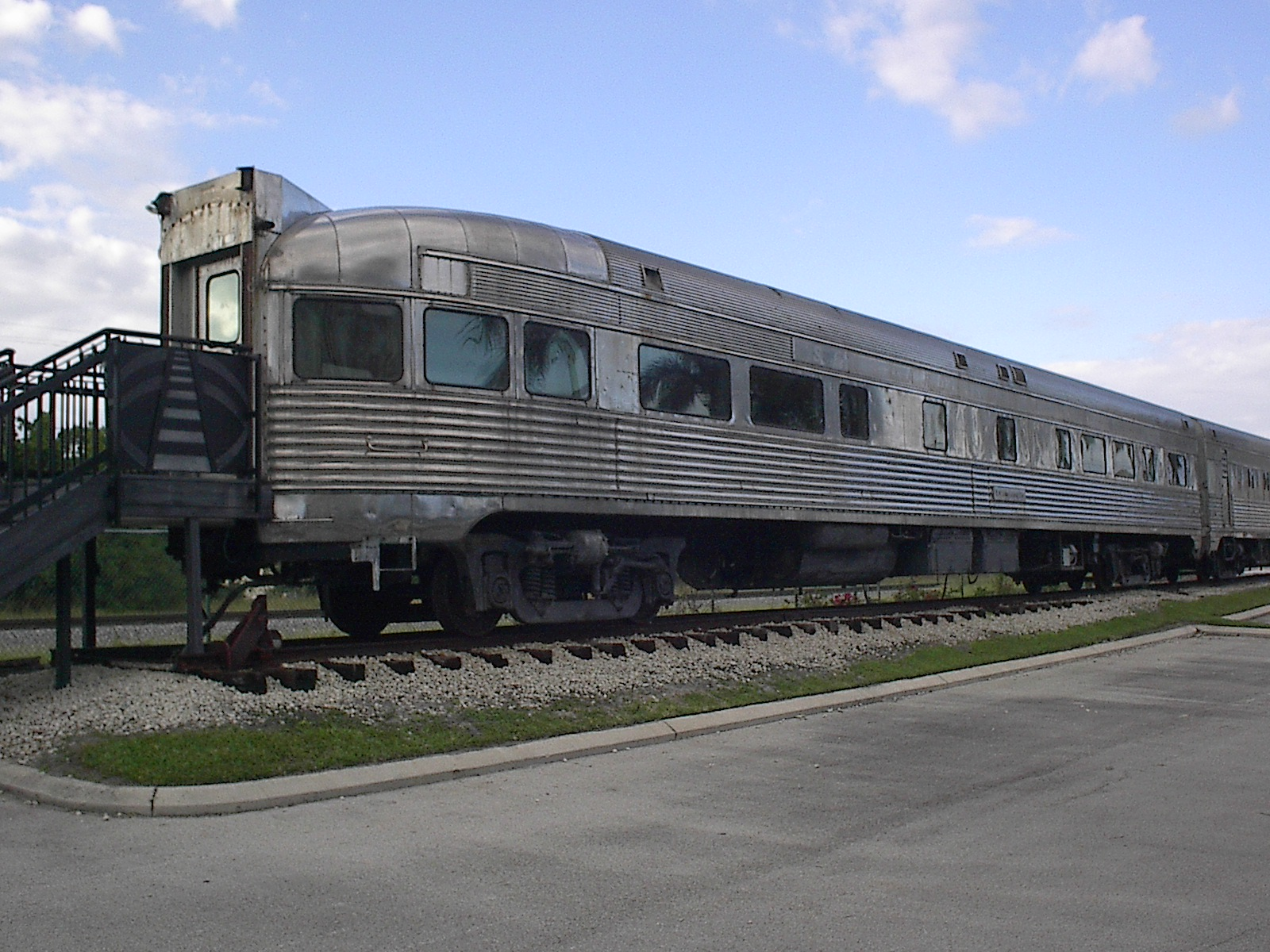
- Seaboard Air Line Railroad Lounge Car number 6603 is on display next to the former Florida East Coast Railway Depot in Boca Raton.
- Location: Boca Raton, Florida United States
- Coordinates: 26.342179°N 80.089120°W
- Built: 1947
- NRHP reference No.: 01000335
- Added to NRHP: April 5, 2001

The Seaboard Air Line Lounge Car-6603 is a historic Seaboard Air Line Railroad passenger car in Boca Raton, Florida. It is located at 747 South Dixie Highway, off U.S. 1, part of the restored Florida East Coast Railway Passenger Station. On April 5, 2001, it was added to the U.S. National Register of Historic Places. It was originally built by the Budd Company in 1947.
