= Professional Building (West Palm Beach, Florida) =

- U.S. National Register of Historic Places
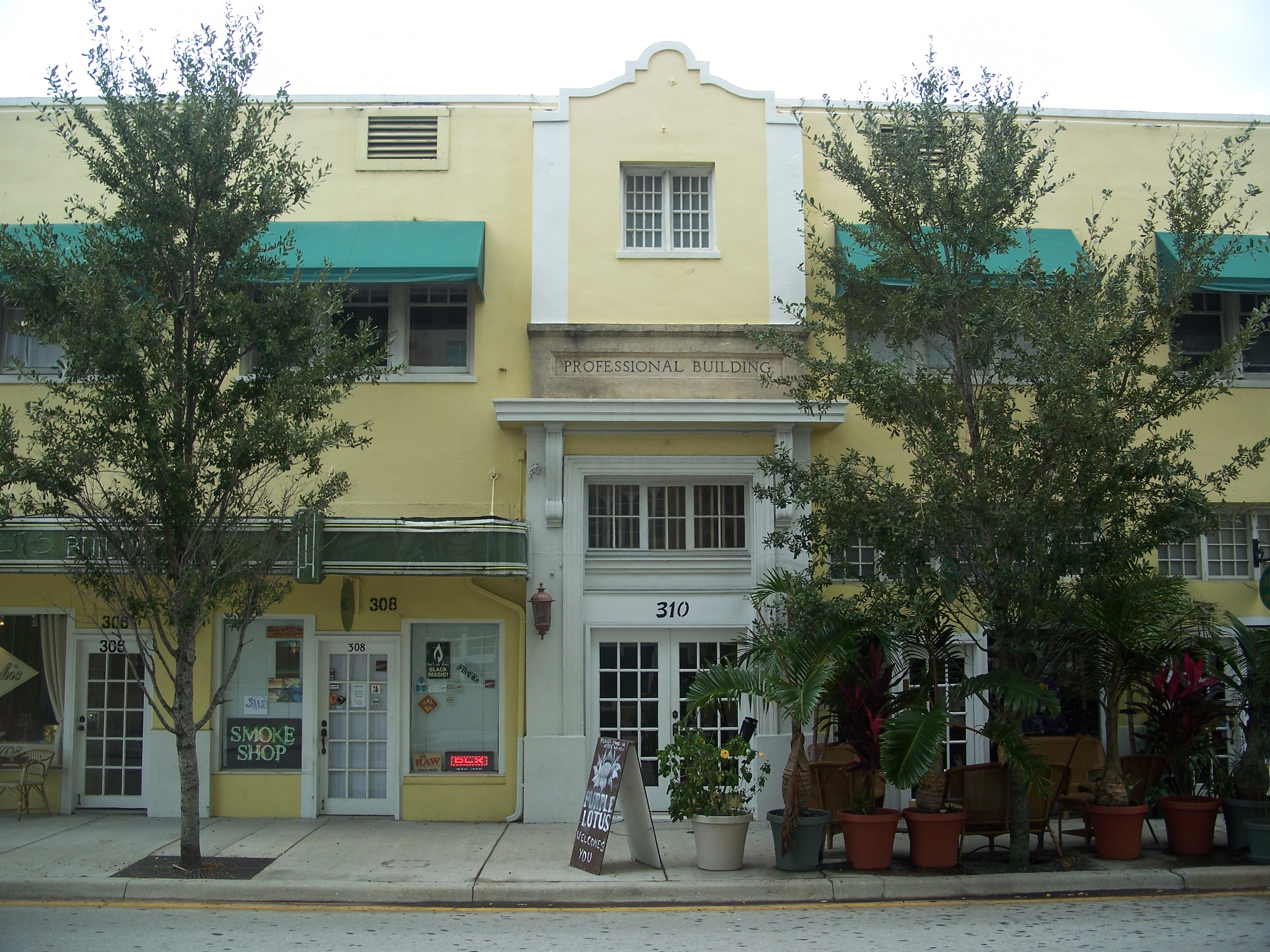

- Location within Florida Location within the United States
- Location: West Palm Beach, Florida
- Coordinates: 26°42′39″N 80°3′13″W
- NRHP reference No.: 96001187
- Added to NRHP: October 24, 1996

The Professional Building is a historic site in West Palm Beach, Florida. A vision of Philadelphia businessmen Horace Linton and Frank E. Masland, the two-story, Mission/Spanish Colonial Revival-style building is located at 310 South Dixie Highway. Many types of businesses occupied the building between when it opened in 1921 and the late 1950s. Few, if any, non-residential structures existed in that section of West Palm Beach in the early 1920s. On October 24, 1996, the Professional Building was added to the U.S. National Register of Historic Places.

== History and description ==
The 1920s Florida land boom brought many new businesses to West Palm Beach. Among the businessmen migrating to the area were Horace Linton and Frank E. Masland, both from Philadelphia. The former manufactured ribbons, and the latter manufactured carpets with C. H. Masland & Sons and also worked as the East Coast Hardware Company's (located on Clematis Street) president. Linton and Masland bought a former church lot from W. L. Bragg and J. C. Stowers for $40,000 in 1920. Remarkably, that plot rose in price by $25,000 from the previous year. Highlighting the structure's significance, Amy Groover and Sherry Piland of the Florida Bureau of Historic Preservation stated that the "Professional Building was a center of retail and residential activity, and was also associated with important citizens who were notably involved in the development of the city."

Linton and Masland both conceptualized using their new plot to construct a professional building, where locals or travelers could visit a dentist, doctor, lawyer, etc. within one structure. They contracted the Florida Engineering and Construction Company to erect the building at a cost of $100,000. In 1921, the Mission/Spanish Colonial Revival-style building with two stories opened at 310 South Dixie Highway. Both floors contain approximately 7,500 sq ft (700 m^{2}) of space. Stucco exterior walls cover the building's frame construction. At the time of the Professional Building's development, few non-residential structures existed in that part of West Palm Beach. In 1924, Linton sold his part of the structure to Louis Bucholtz and Masland sold his to Minnie Thomas. David Rosenheim and W. O. Thompson then purchased the building for $250,000 about a year later.

A modification in 1937 added a canted corner, while in 1941, transomed windows above the entrance were replaced with an Art Deco-esque marquee. Various businesses occupied the building from its construction in 1921 through the late 1950s, including industries such as accounting, automobiles, construction, groceries, investing, lodging, medical, pharmaceuticals, photography, and real estate. Additionally, West Palm Beach Mayor William P. "Bill" Holland owned a barbershop on the ground floor. On October 24, 1996, the Professional Building was added to the National Register of Historic Places. The Palm Beach Daily News reported several months earlier that "the 1920s-era building at 310 S. Dixie Highway was recently remodeled into low-cost lofts and galleries by The Downtown Group."

== See also ==
- National Register of Historic Places listings in Palm Beach County, Florida
