= Seaboard Air Line 6113 =

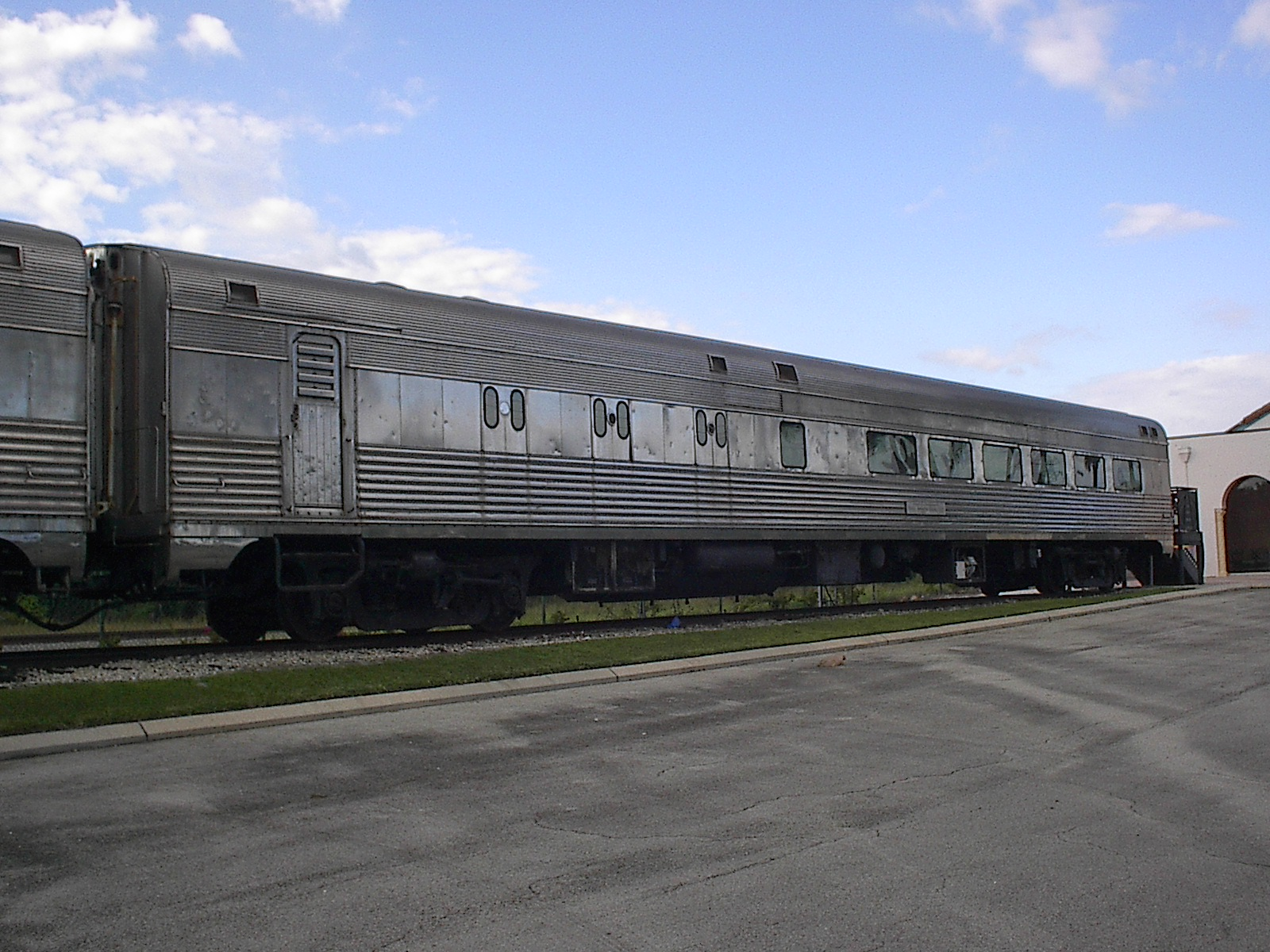
- Seaboard Air Line Railroad Dining Car number 6113 is on display next to the former Florida East Coast Railway Depot in Boca Raton.
- Manufacturer: Budd Company
- Constructed: 1947
- Formation: Dining car
- Fleet numbers: SAL: 6113
- Capacity: 48
- Operators: Seaboard Air Line; Seaboard Coast Line

Specifications
- Seating
- Seaboard Air Line Dining Car-#6113
- U.S. National Register of Historic Places
- Location: Boca Raton, Florida United States
- Coordinates: 26.342410°N 80.089079°W
- Built: 1947
- NRHP reference No.: 01000334
- Added to NRHP: April 5, 2001
- Track gauge: 1,435 mm (4 ft 8 1/2 in)

The Seaboard Air Line Dining Car-#6113 is a historic Seaboard Air Line Railroad dining car in Boca Raton, Florida. It has been restored, and is located at 747 South Dixie Highway, off U.S. 1, part of the Boca Express Train Museum. On April 5, 2001, it was added to the U.S. National Register of Historic Places. It was originally built by the Budd Company in 1947 and could seat 48.
