= Palm Beach Mercantile Company =

- Palm Beach Mercantile Company Building
- U.S. National Register of Historic Places
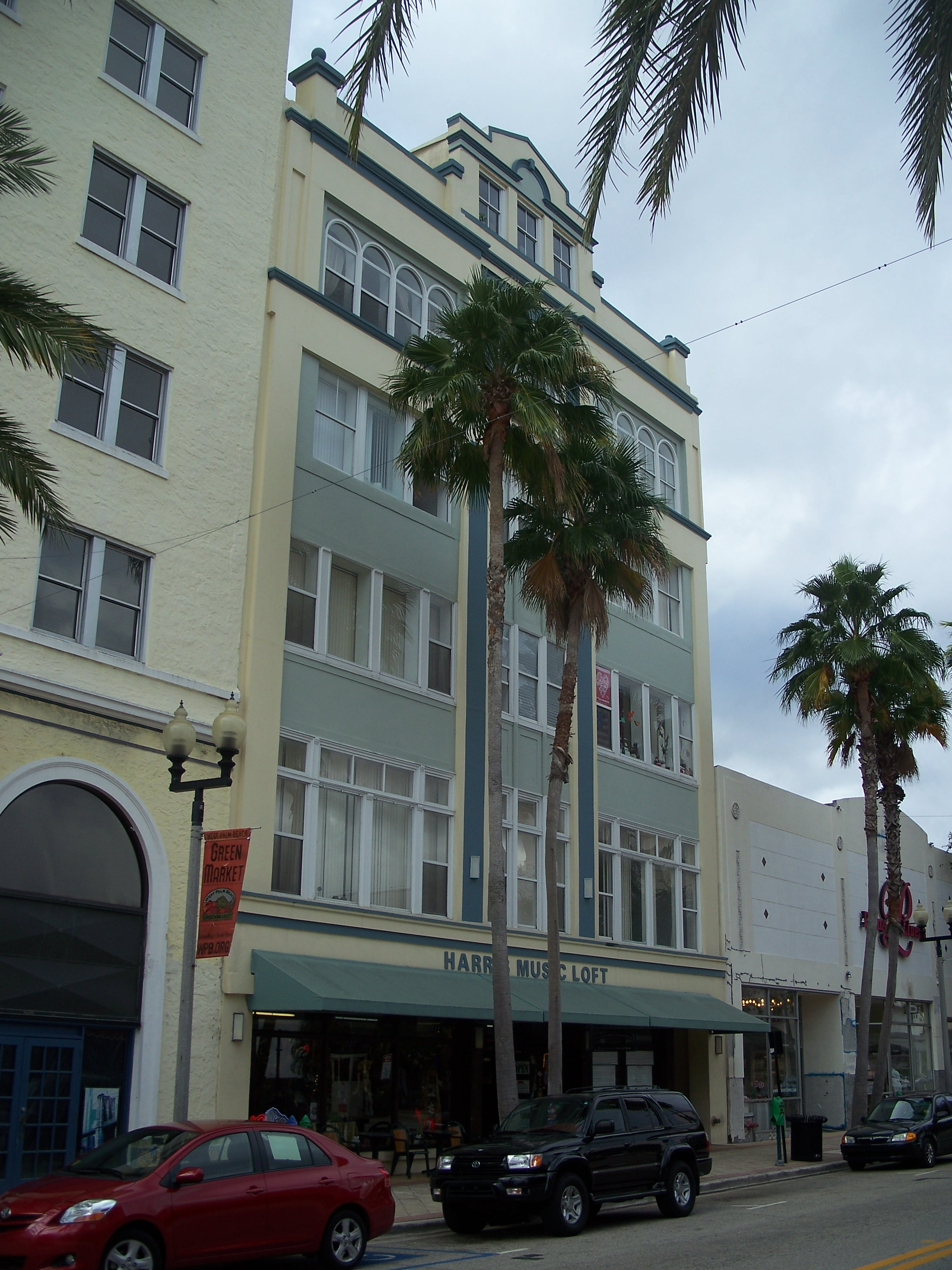

- Location within Florida Location within the United States
- Location: West Palm Beach, Florida
- Coordinates: 26°42′46″N 80°3′8″W
- NRHP reference No.: 93001552
- Added to NRHP: January 28, 1994

The Palm Beach Mercantile Company Building is a historic site in West Palm Beach, Florida. It is located at 206 Clematis Street. A vernacular commercial building constructed around 1900, it grew to two floors in 1902, five floors in 1916, and then a partial sixth floor was added in 1923. The Palm Beach Mercantile Company was the first department store in West Palm Beach and had an unprecedented $1.3 million in sales in 1924. After the Palm Beach Mercantile Company ceased to exist in 1963, the structure was used as a dance studio and music company before becoming an apartment building in the early 1990s. On January 28, 1994, the site was added to the U.S. National Register of Historic Places.

== History and description ==
In 1896, West Palm Beach Mayor Marion Eugene "M. E." Gruber established the M.E. Gruber Hardware and Furniture Company at 111 North Narcissus Avenue, while William Hatchett and William Harley Da Camara formed Hatchett-Da Camara Hardware Company in 1903. After initially being competitors, the two companies merged in 1907, becoming the Lake Worth Mercantile Company. The business then changed its name to the Palm Beach Mercantile in 1912 after the nearby settlement of Lucerne was renamed Lake Worth. The Palm Beach Mercantile Company building was constructed around 1900 at 206 Clematis Street, originally with one story and two rooms. During the next few decades, the structure was expanded to two floors in 1902 and five floors in 1916, while a partial sixth story was added in 1923. At one point, the second floor was used as an opera house and theatre.

Although many modifications have been made over the years, the structure remains a rectangular, vernacular-style commercial building primarily composed of a steel frame, reinforced concrete, bricks, and clay tile, while also possessing a flat roof. During the 1920s, the Palm Beach Mercantile Company became the first department store in West Palm Beach, rather than limiting itself to furniture and hardware. The store sold an unprecedented $1.3 million in merchandise in 1924. Consequently, Gruber began purchasing nearby properties on South Narcissus Avenue and Datura Street. This included constructing a four-story building along the latter, referred to as the Datura Street annex. The building at 206 Clematis Street and the Datura Street annex would be connected by bridges on the second, third, and fourth stories. In total, the Palm Beach Mercantile Company owned nearly 3 acres (1.2 ha) of land at its peak.

Gruber eventually began to pursue other enterprises and resigned as the company's president in 1926. Da Camara then became its president and continued to expand the company across the South Florida region until he died in 1931. After C. W. Carroll controlled the business for nearly 20 years, its ownership changed twice in the 1950s, to Mortimer Sachs in 1950 and then to Phil H. Fisher and Associates in 1956. Under Sachs, a metal panel was added to the first and second floors, and concrete replaced the second-story windows, all on only the north facade. The Palm Beach Mercantile Company then went out of business in 1958 and remained in receivership until ceasing to exist in 1963.

For many years afterward, the building housed a music company and dance studio before being converted into apartments in the early 1990s. It has also been called the Harris Building. On January 28, 1994, the Palm Beach Mercantile Company building was added to the National Register of Historic Places. As of 2022, the structure contained 38 apartment units.

== See also ==
- National Register of Historic Places listings in Palm Beach County, Florida
