= Boca Raton Fire Engine No. 1 =

- U.S. National Register of Historic Places
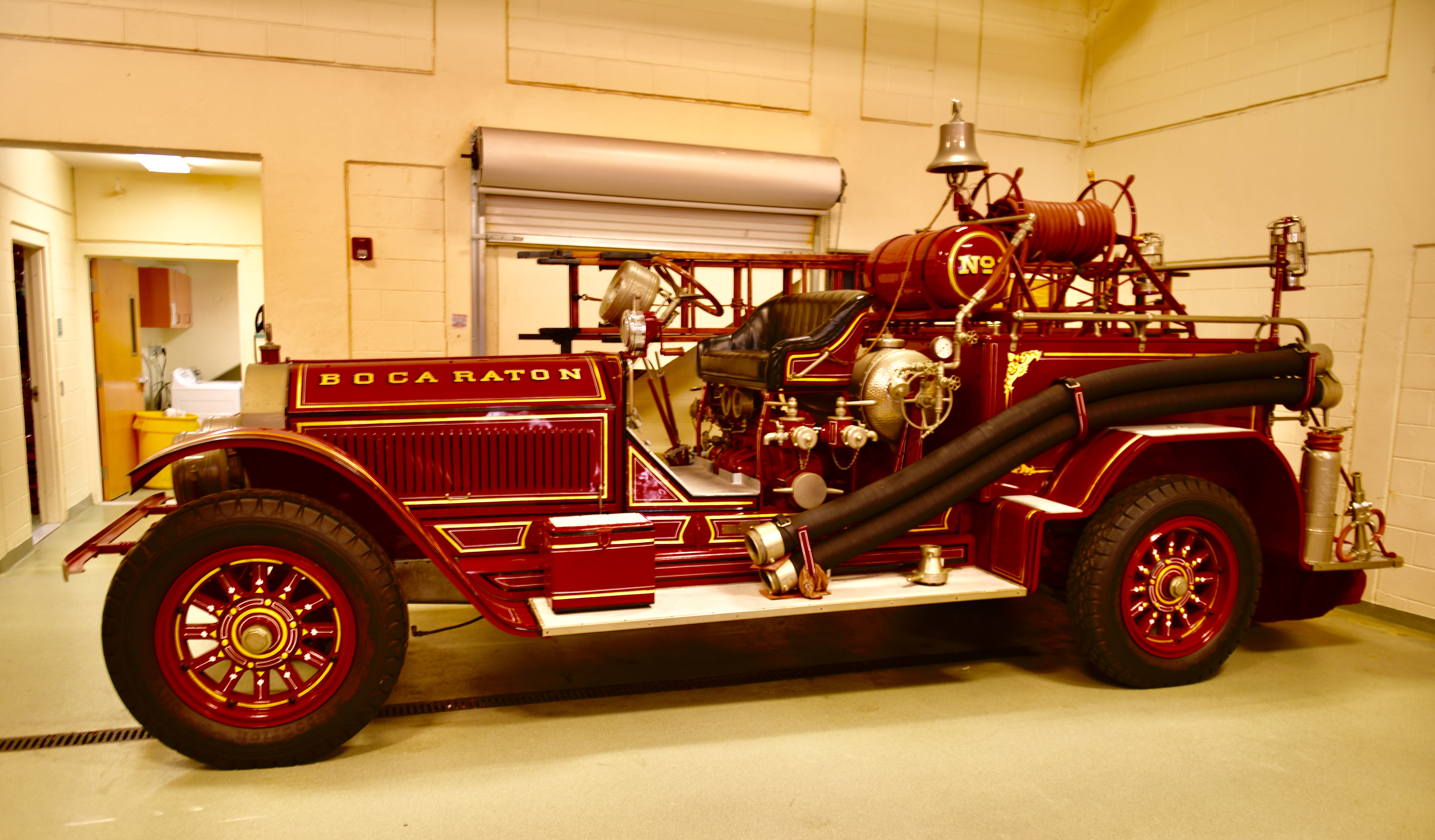

- Location within Florida Location within the United States
- Location: Boca Raton, Florida
- Coordinates: 26°20′59.01″N 80°04′12.75″W
- NRHP reference No.: 01001195
- Added to NRHP: 1 November 2001

Boca Raton Fire Engine No. 1 is a historic fire engine in Boca Raton, Florida, United States. It is located at 100 South Ocean Boulevard. An American LaFrance built in 1925 and still used for parades and fire safety education, it was added to the US National Register of Historic Places on November 1, 2001. It was later moved from its Ocean Boulevard location to the old Fire Station #2 at 1 Southwest Twelfth Avenue.
