= Northboro Park Historic District =

Historic district in Florida, United States

- U.S. National Register of Historic Places
- U.S. Historic district
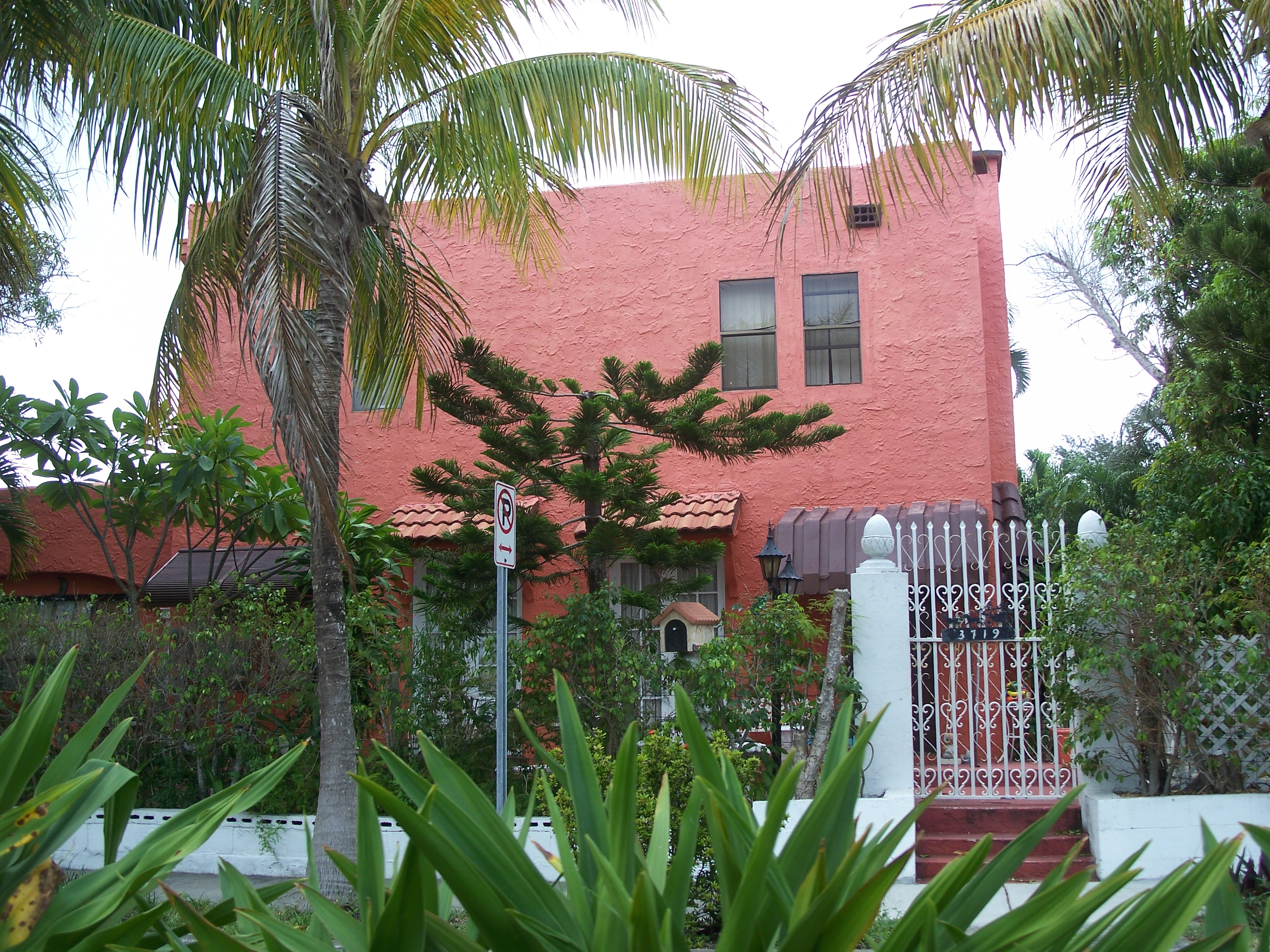

- Location within Florida Location within the United States
- Location: West Palm Beach, Florida
- Coordinates: 26°44′51″N 80°3′16″W
- NRHP reference No.: 07000059
- Added to NRHP: February 20, 2007

The Northboro Park Historic District is a U.S. historic district (designated as such on February 20, 2007) located in West Palm Beach, Florida. The district is bounded by 40th N, Flagler Drive, 36th Street and Broadway.
