= Boca Express Train Museum =

- Boca Raton Florida East Coast Railway Station
- U.S. National Register of Historic Places
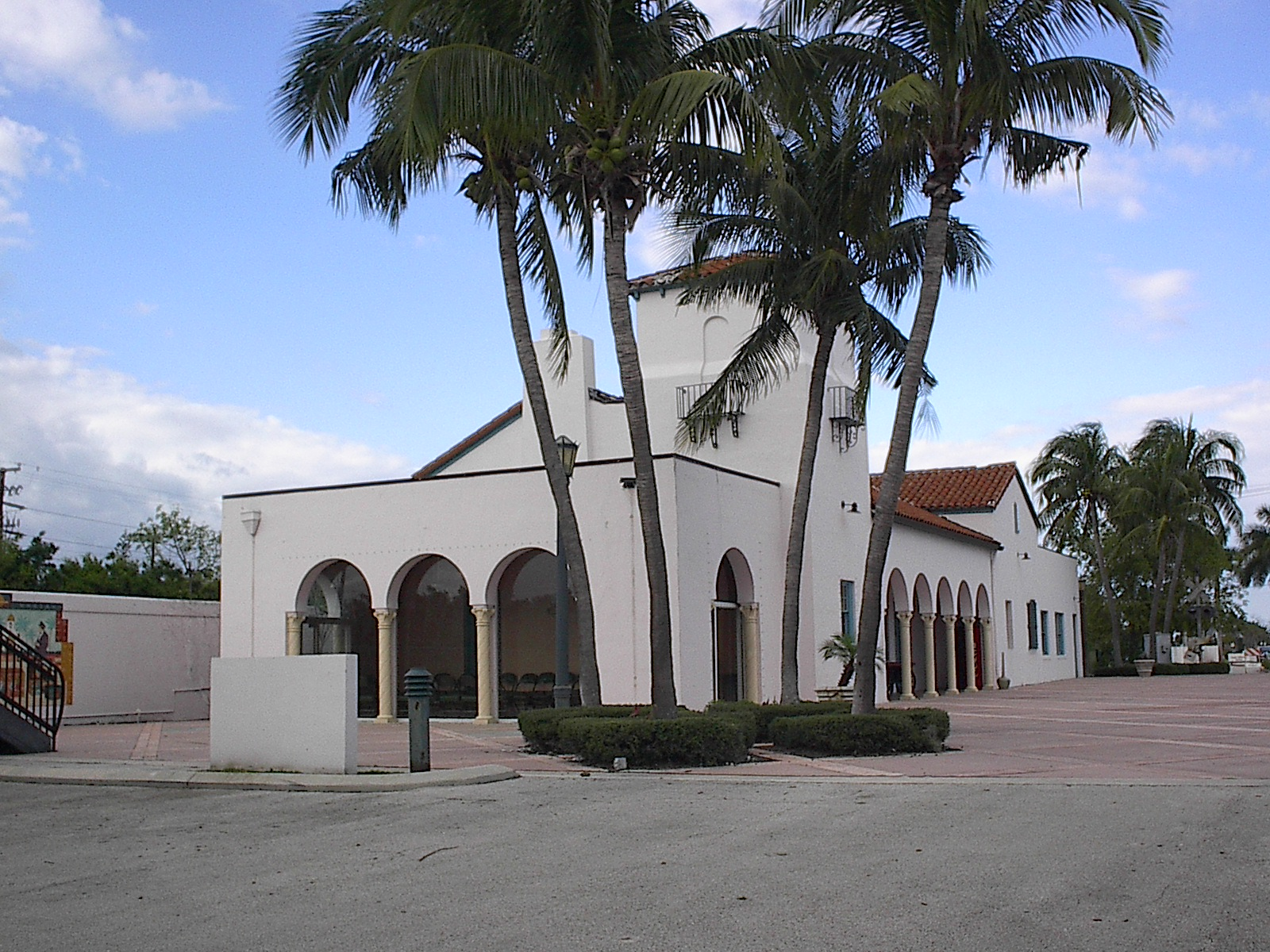
- The Florida East Coast Railway Station in Boca Raton was renovated as the Count de Hoernle Pavilion, and then became the Boca Express Train Museum

- Location within Florida Location within the United States
- Location: 747 South Dixie Highway; Boca Raton, Florida United States
- Coordinates: 26°20′33.92″N 80°5′20.38″W
- Built: 1930
- Architect: Chester G. Henninger
- Architectural style: Mediterranean Revival
- NRHP reference No.: 80000959
- Added to NRHP: 24 October 1980

The Boca Express Train Museum, operated by the Boca Raton Historical Society, is housed in a restored 1930 Florida East Coast Railway (FEC) train station in Boca Raton, Florida. designed by Chester G. Henninger, built for Clarence H. Geist. It is located at 747 South Dixie Highway, off U.S. 1 (Federal Highway). On October 24, 1980, it was added to the U.S. National Register of Historic Places.

That the building was restored and turned into a museum must be credited to the philanthropist Countess de Hoernle, who bought the abandoned building as a present for her husband.

== Use as a passenger train station ==
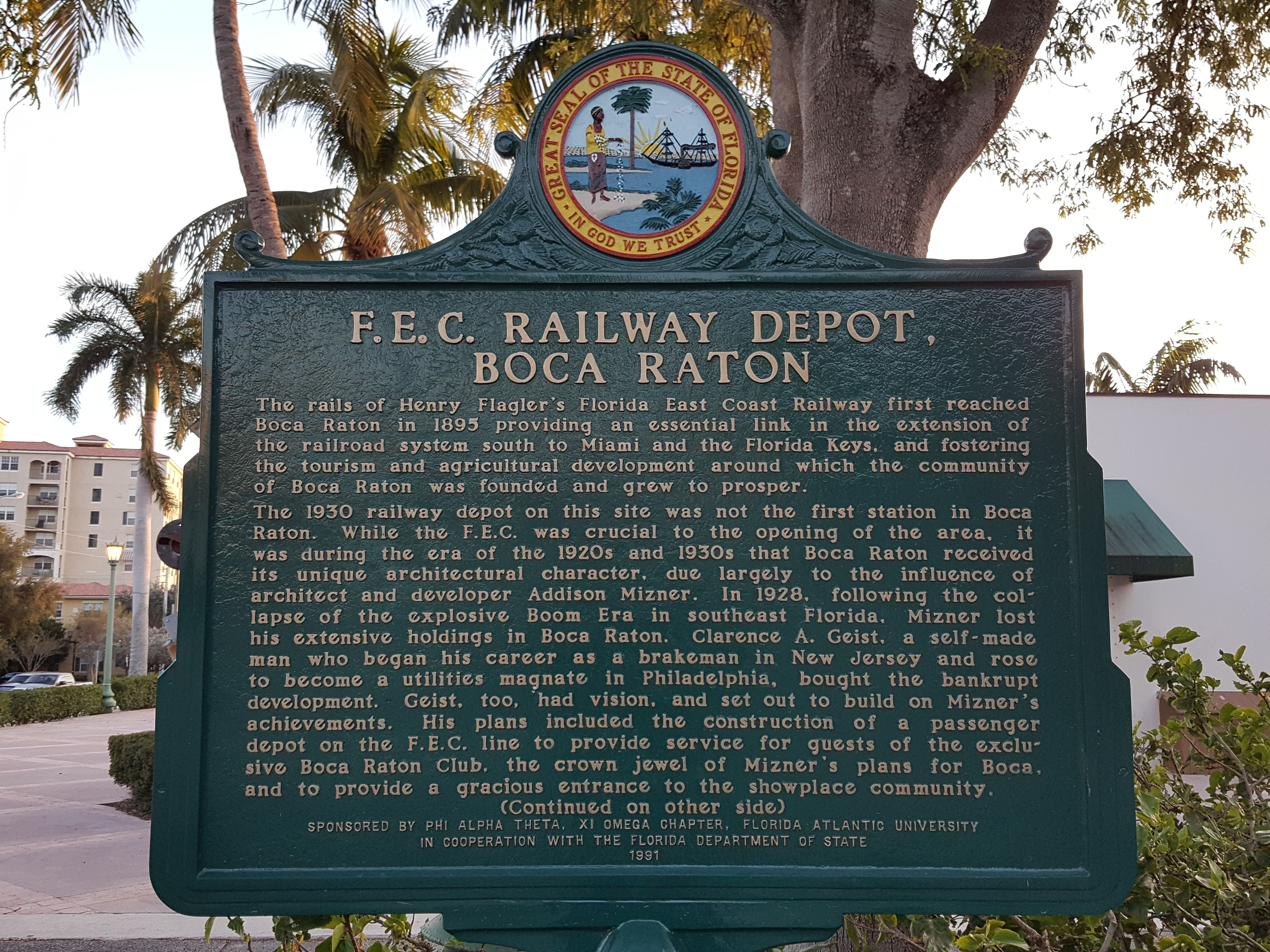
Historical plaque regarding the Boca Raton FEC station.

Historically, the station served several long-distance trains and one or two local trains. Into the early 1960s, passengers could take one of two Chicago-bound trains (on alternating days), the City of Miami or the South Wind (both via Birmingham) and the New York City-bound East Coast Champion, Havana Special, and Miamian from the FEC's station. Into the latter 1950s, passengers could take the Dixie Flagler to Chicago via Atlanta from the station. The FEC operated local passenger service between Jacksonville and the Miami area until July 31, 1968.

Service on the line was restored by Brightline, with a station 3/4 mile (1.2 km) north of the museum opening on December 21, 2022.

== Exhibits ==
The museum contains two restored and unique 1947 Seaboard Air Line streamlined rail cars, a dining and a lounge car, built by the Budd Company and listed on the National Register of Historic Places. The Boca Express Train Museum also includes a 1946 Atlantic Coast Line caboose and a 1930 Baldwin steam switch engine.

== For sale ==
The Boca Raton Historical Society put the Train Museum up for sale in 2017, saying that maintaining two historic buildings (the other is the Society's home, Boca Raton's first city hall) is draining the nonprofit's resources.

== See also ==
- Seaboard Air Line 6113
- Seaboard Air Line 6603
- South Florida Railway Museum

Preceding station	Florida East Coast Railway	Following station
Deerfield Beach toward Miami	Main Line	Yamato toward Jacksonville
