= Central Park Historic District (West Palm Beach, Florida) =

Historic district in Florida, United States

- U.S. National Register of Historic Places
- U.S. Historic district
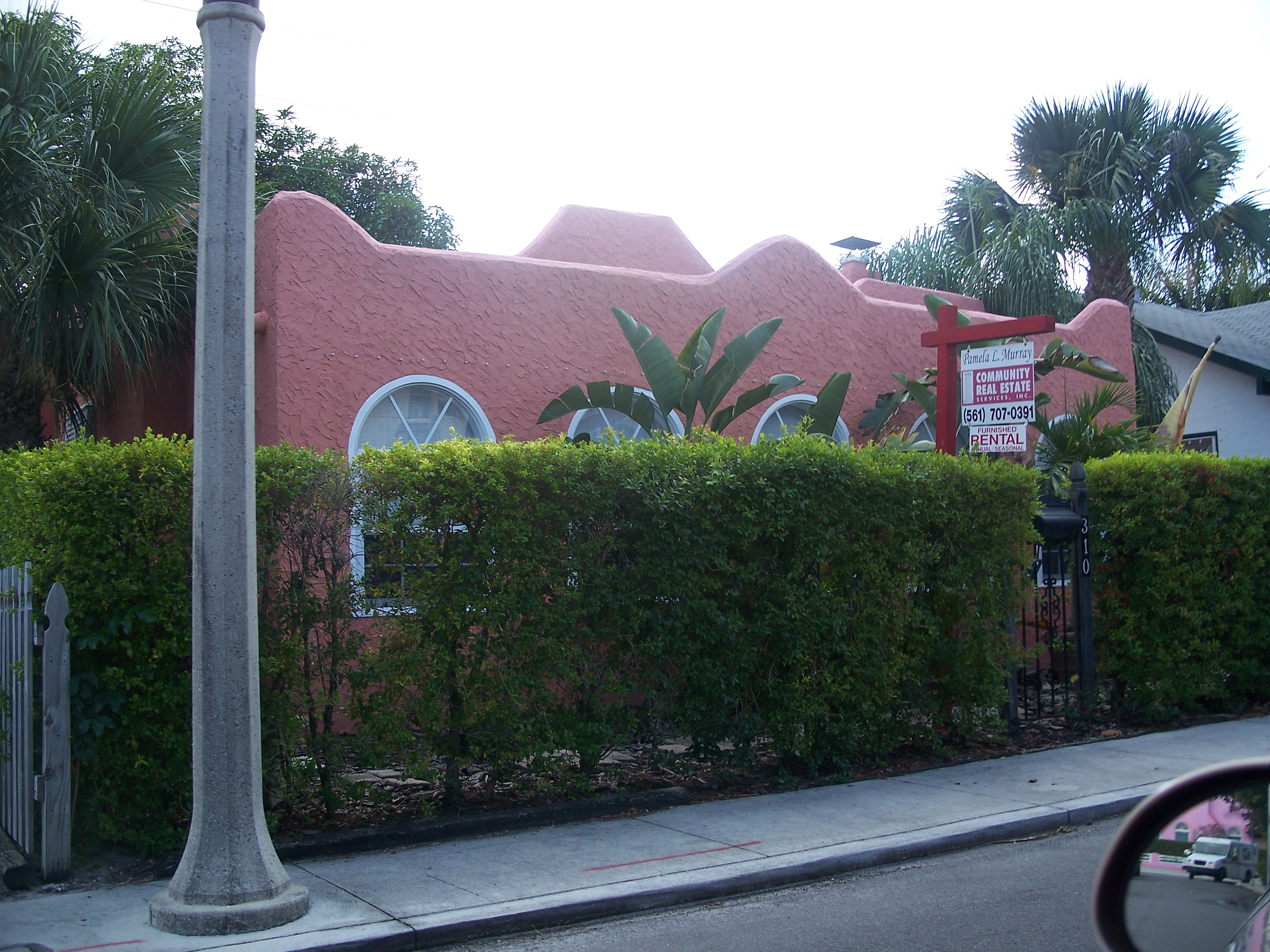

- Location within Florida Location within the United States
- Location: West Palm Beach, Florida
- Coordinates: 26°40′37″N 80°3′6″W
- Area: 24 acres (97,000 m^{2})
- NRHP reference No.: 99000898
- Added to NRHP: 28 July 1999

The Central Park Historic District (also known as Estates of South Palm Beach) is a U.S. historic district (designated as such on July 28, 1999) located in West Palm Beach, Florida. The district runs roughly along SR 805 and South Olive Avenue, from Monroe Drive to Southern Boulevard. It contains 155 historic buildings.
