= Flamingo Park Historic Residential District =

Historic district in Florida, United States

- U.S. National Register of Historic Places
- U.S. Historic district
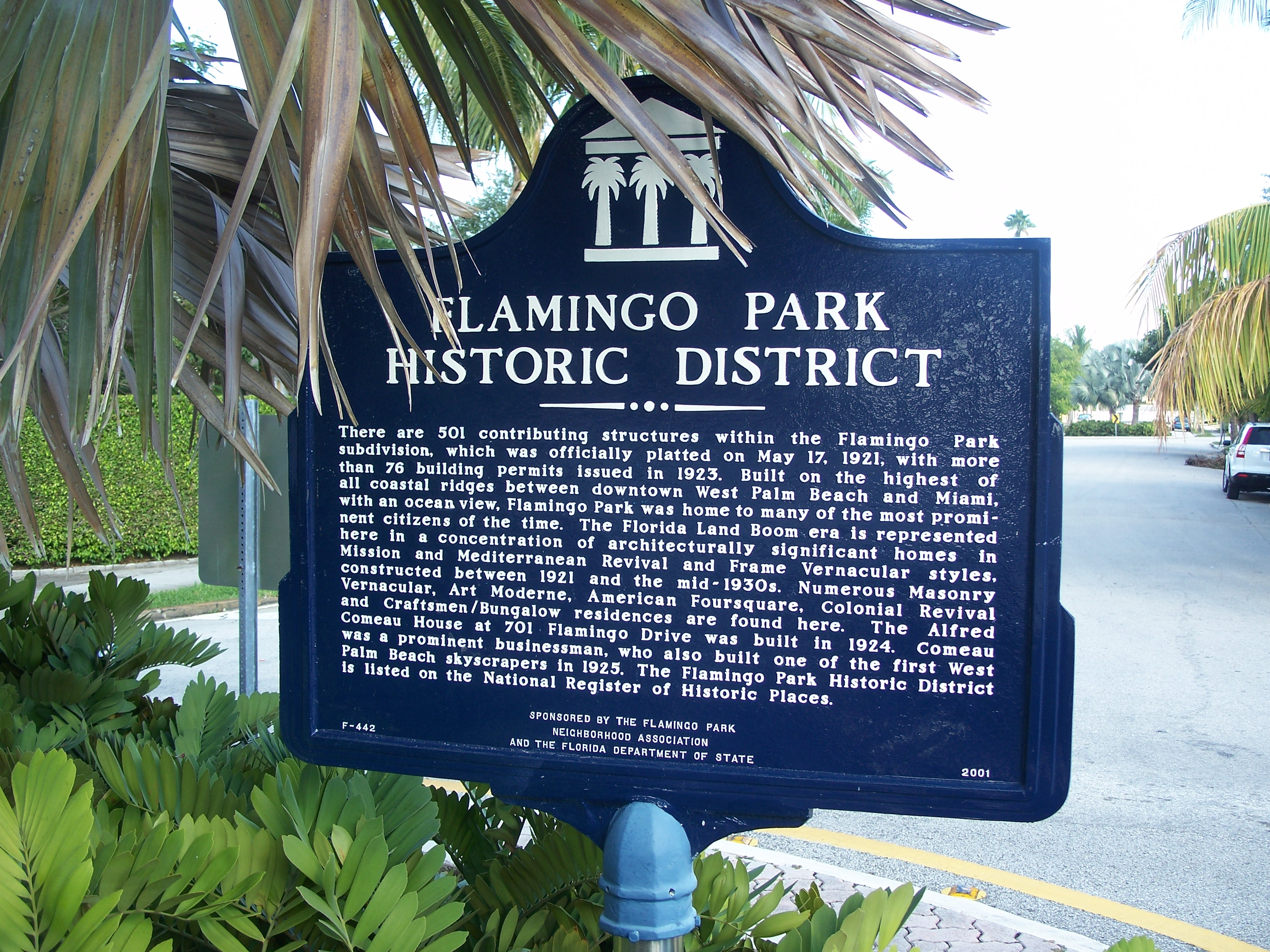
- Historic Marker

- Location within Florida Location within the United States
- Location: West Palm Beach, Florida
- Coordinates: 26°41′33″N 80°3′38″W
- Area: 95 acres (380,000 m^{2})
- Architectural style: Mission/Spanish Revival
- NRHP reference No.: 00000785
- Added to NRHP: July 14, 2000

The Flamingo Park Historic Residential District is a U.S. historic district (designated as such on July 14, 2000) located in West Palm Beach, Florida. The district is bounded by Park Place, Parker Avenue, Belvedere Road, and Florida Avenue. It contains 458 historic buildings.

It is served by the Howard Park Community Center, which provides services for the neighborhood as well as activities for other West Palm Beach residents. Flamingo Park is located conveniently close to downtown Clematis and City Place.

Flamingo Park's tree-lined streets are kept up by City of West Palm Beach employees and a neighborhood resident association, which recognizes a house every month for its visual improvement. The neighborhood strives to keep up its historic roots.
