= Ken Keyes =

Ken Keyes may refer to:

- Ken Keyes Jr., author and lecturer
- Ken Keyes (politician)
