= Latrous =

Latrous is a surname. Notable people with the surname include:

- Lila Latrous (born 1979), Algerian judoka
- Lotti Latrous (born 1953), Swiss philanthropist
