= Hoernlé =

Hoernlé is a surname. Notable people with the surname include:

- Adolfe and Henrietta Hoernle (Count and Countess de Hoernle)
- Rudolf Hoernlé (1841–1918), Indologist and philologist
- Winifred Hoernlé (1885–1960), South African anthropologist
