= Yaacov Heller =

American sculptor

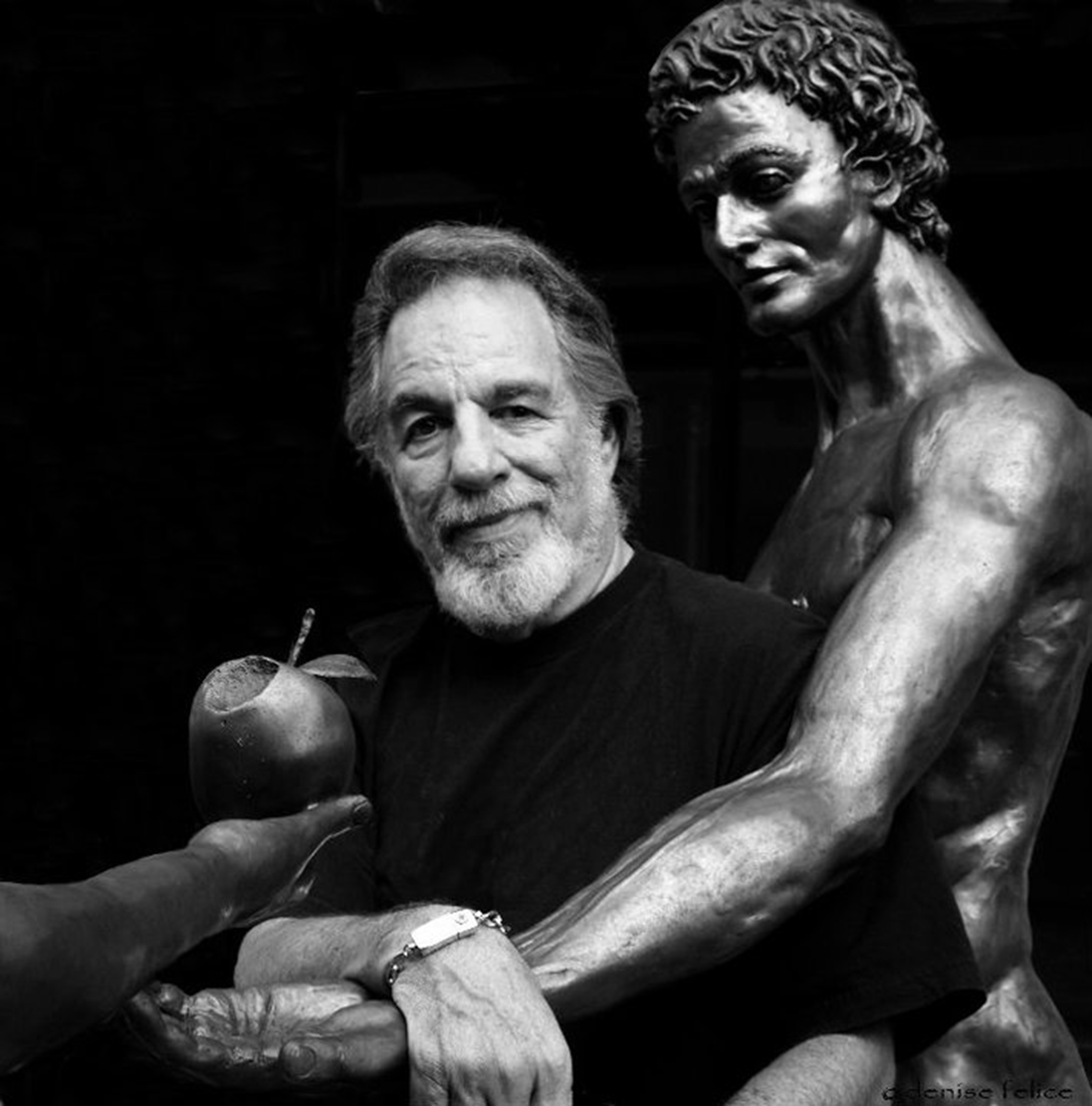
- Yaacov Heller with his Adam (and Eve) sculpture
- Born: Jack E. Heller; 1941 (age 84–85); Cleveland, Ohio
- Occupations: Sculptor, jewelry designer
- Known for: Sculptures of Biblical themes
- Website: yaacovheller.com

Yaacov Heller (born 1941) is an Israeli-American sculptor and jewelry designer based in Boca Raton, Florida, who is known for his sculptures of Biblical themes. In 2020, he was the recipient of 22nd Annual Opal Awards by The Rotary Club of Boca Raton.

== Early life and artistic career ==
Heller was born in 1941 in Cleveland, Ohio, as Jack E. Heller into a traditional Jewish family. He studied at the Cleveland Museum of Art and has served in the US Navy. In 1965, he moved to California, and began to develop a wide range of custom-made gold jewelry.

Heller quickly became friends with some of Hollywood's royalty, creating custom art for them – including earrings for Shelley Winters, paintings and sculptures for Sammy Davis Jr., and a special pendant for the hit show, The Courtship of Eddie's Father. This pendant was commissioned to Heller by the show's producer, James Komack. Heller created 150 fourteen-karat gold pendants, which represented the "clasped hands logo" of the show. They were given as holiday gifts and worn by a "who's who" on the MGM lot, including Elizabeth Taylor, Elvis Presley, and Bill Bixby amongst many others.

In 1972, he became a resident of Jerusalem, Israel, and was a member of Kibbutz Urim.

Since the 1970s, Heller has been commissioned to create silver and bronze electroformed-cast representations of Biblical figures. These were given to world leaders including Gerald Ford, King Sobhuza II, Husni Mubarak, Anwar Sadat, and John Vorster.

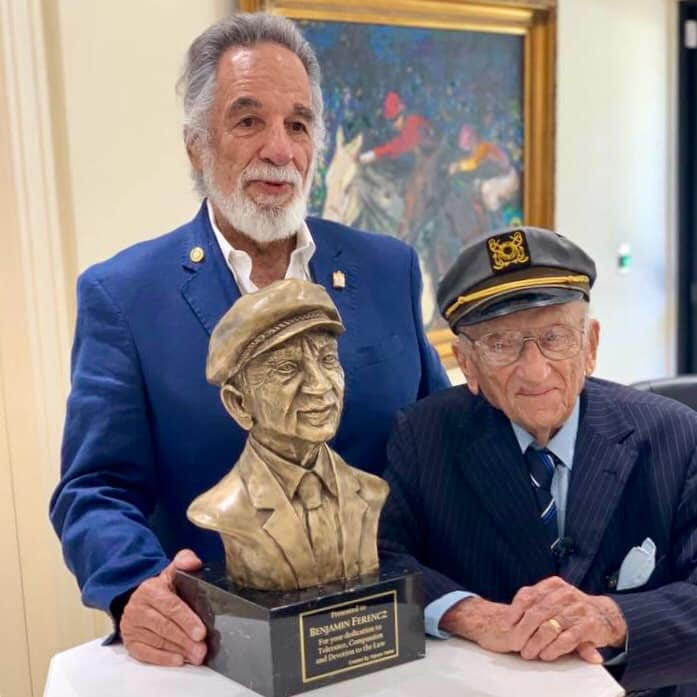
Heller presenting Benjamin Ferencz his bust in a presentation July, 2019.

According to The Boca Newspaper and the Sun Sentinel newspaper, Heller has created a wide range of Judaica statues and busts, and figural statuaries such as the Fiddler on the Roof, Count and Countess de Hoernle, and the Bust of Benjamin Ferencz.

In 2014, Heller was commissioned to create The Garden of Humanity, a memorial which recognizes the six major genocides of the 20th century. It was unveiled April 25, 2015.

On September 7, 2020, the documentary Two Heads Are Better Than One: Making of the Ben Ferencz Bust, starring Ferencz and sculptor Yaacov Heller, made its world premiere. It was produced by Eric Kline Productions and directed by Eric Kline.

On December 17, 2020, Benjamin Ferencz was decorated with the title of 'Distinguished Honorary Fellow of the ICC' and his bust, created by Heller, was unveiled to be housed permanently at the International Criminal Court in the Hague.

== Exhibitions ==
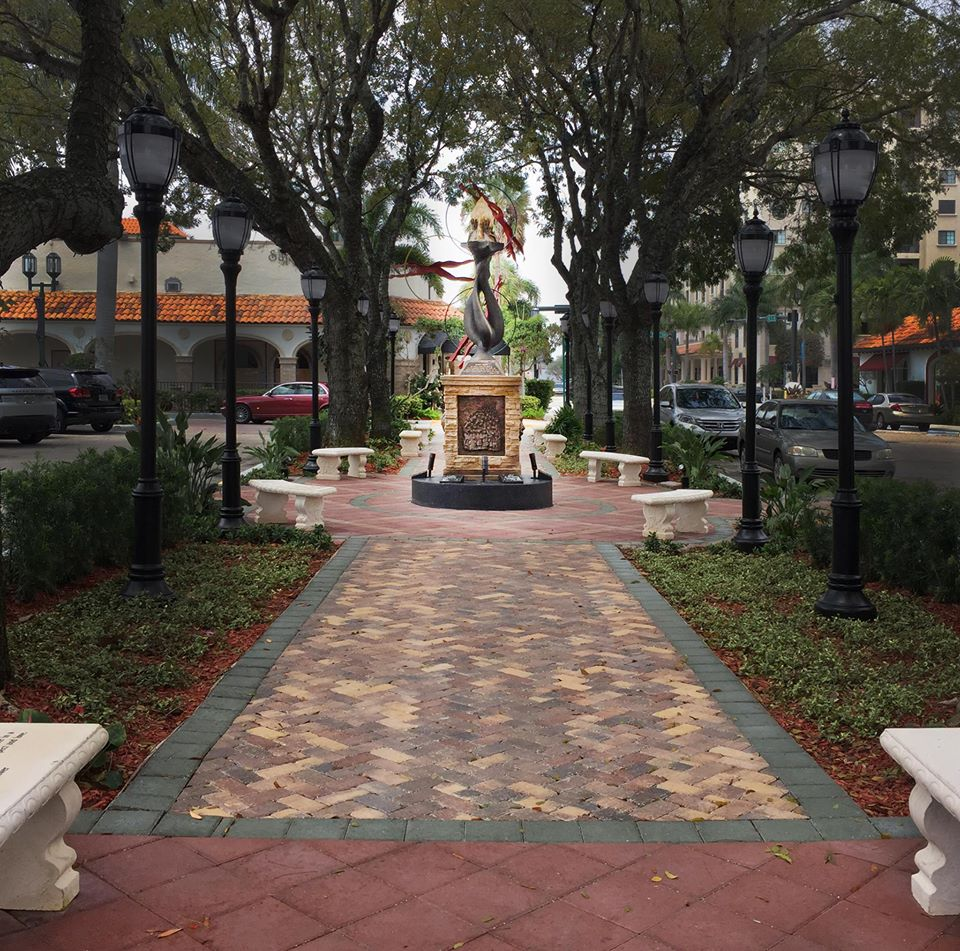
The Garden of Humanity in downtown Boca Raton, Florida, designed by Heller in 2015

- A collection of Heller's Biblical tableaus was displayed at the Peeler Art Center of DePauw University from April to May, 2015.
- The original David and Goliath presented to Gerald Ford is now in the Gerald Ford Library Museum in Grand Rapids, Michigan.

== Selected artworks ==
- Clasped Hands, (1966)
- David and Goliath, (1974)
- The Sacrifice of Isaac, (1972)
- The Death of Samson, (1975)
- Elijah Rising to Heaven, (1976)
- Fiddler on the Roof, (1989)
- Flossy’s Fountain, (2003)
- Count Adolph and Countess Henrietta de Hoernle, bronze, (2011)
- Menorah, bronze, 15-feet high (2014), Congregation B’Nai Torah, South Boca Raton
- The Garden of Humanity, (2015)
- Bust of Benjamin Ferencz, (2019)
