= J.J. Goldberg =

American journalist on Jewish issues

J. J. Goldberg
- Born: November 6, 1949 (age 76)
- Occupations: Journalist, author, lecturer
- Writing career
- Genres: U.S. politics (U.S. Jewry, Middle East)
- Website: forward.com/author/j-j-goldberg

Jonathan Jeremy Goldberg is an American journalist who served as editor-in-chief of The Forward for seven years (2000–07). He previously worked as U.S. bureau chief for the Israeli news magazine The Jerusalem Report, managing editor of The Jewish Week of New York City, as a nationally syndicated columnist in Jewish weeklies, as editor in chief of the Labor Zionist monthly Jewish Frontier, as world/national news editor of the daily Home News (now the Home News Tribune) of New Brunswick, New Jersey, and as a metro/police-beat reporter for Hamevaker, a short-lived Hebrew-language newsweekly published for the Israeli émigré community in Los Angeles.

Goldberg is the author of Jewish Power: Inside the American Jewish Establishment, published in 1996. His previous books include Builders and Dreamers (1993) and The Jewish Americans (1992).

== Early life ==
Goldberg was born in New York City and raised in Massapequa, Long Island, until age 13, when he moved with his family to Washington, D.C. After graduating from Woodrow Wilson High School he moved to New York City in the winter of 1967, working in a picture-frame factory. He enrolled in McGill University in 1968, after spending a year on the Habonim Workshop at Kibbutz Urim in the Negev. At McGill, he was active in the Student Zionist Organization, and was an editor of its weekly campus newspaper, Otherstand. He became active in left-wing student Jewish causes nationally in the U.S. and Canada, including the Radical Zionist Alliance and the North American Jewish Students Network, where he was elected to the steering committee in 1970.

== Pre-journalism ==
Before entering journalism, Goldberg lived and worked in Israel through much of the 1970s. He served as an education specialist at the World Zionist Organization and was a member of the founding Gar'in (settlement group) of Kibbutz Gezer, near Tel Aviv, where he served a term as the kibbutz secretary-general. He has worked in the past as a taxi driver in New York City, a Jewish communal worker in Los Angeles and a construction laborer in Israel.

He earned a master's degree in journalism at Columbia University in 1985 and a B.A. in Jewish studies and Islamic studies at McGill University in 1972, along with certificates in film animation from the School of Visual Arts and in kibbutz supply purchasing from the Ruppin Institute (now the Ruppin Academic Center) near Hadera.

In 1972 Goldberg was appointed as director of the American Jewish Congress National Commission on Youth.

He has served as a member of the central committees of the Ihud HaKvutzot VeHaKibbutzim Federation, the Israel Labor Party Young Guard and Habonim (now Habonim Dror), and was a sharpshooter in the Israel Border Police civil guard.

== Journalistic career ==
Goldberg became editor of The Forward in 2000 and left the position in 2007 to write a book.

== Books ==
- Jewish Power: Inside the American Jewish Establishment. Addison-Wesley Publishing Co., 1996.
- Builders and Dreamers: Habonim Labor Zionist Youth in North America. Cornwall Books, 1993. (editor)
- The Jewish Americans. Bantam-Doubleday-Dell, 1992.
