= Urim, Israel =

Kibbutz in southern Israel

Urim: אוּרִים (Hebrew); أوريم (Arabic)
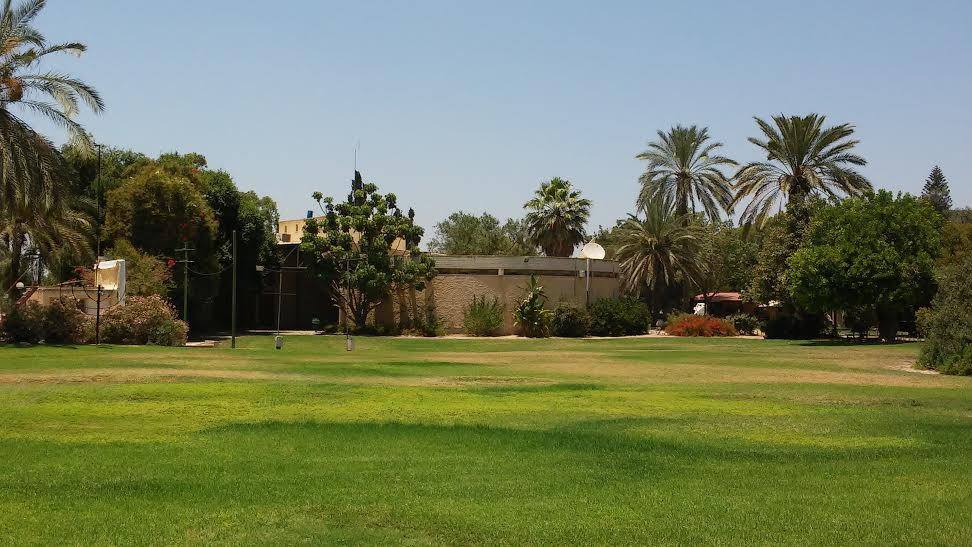

- Location within Northwest Negev region of Israel Location within Israel
- Coordinates: 31°18′15″N 34°31′25″E
- Country: Israel
- District: Southern
- Subdistrict: Beersheba
- Council: Eshkol
- Affiliation: Kibbutz Movement
- Founded: 6 October 1946
- Founder: Bulgarian Jews
- Population (2024): 454

Urim (Hebrew: אוּרִים, lit. Lights) is a kibbutz in the Negev desert in southern Israel. Located near the border of the Gaza Strip and about 30 kilometers west of Beersheba, the kibbutz falls under the jurisdiction of Eshkol Regional Council. In 2024, it had a population of 454.

== History ==
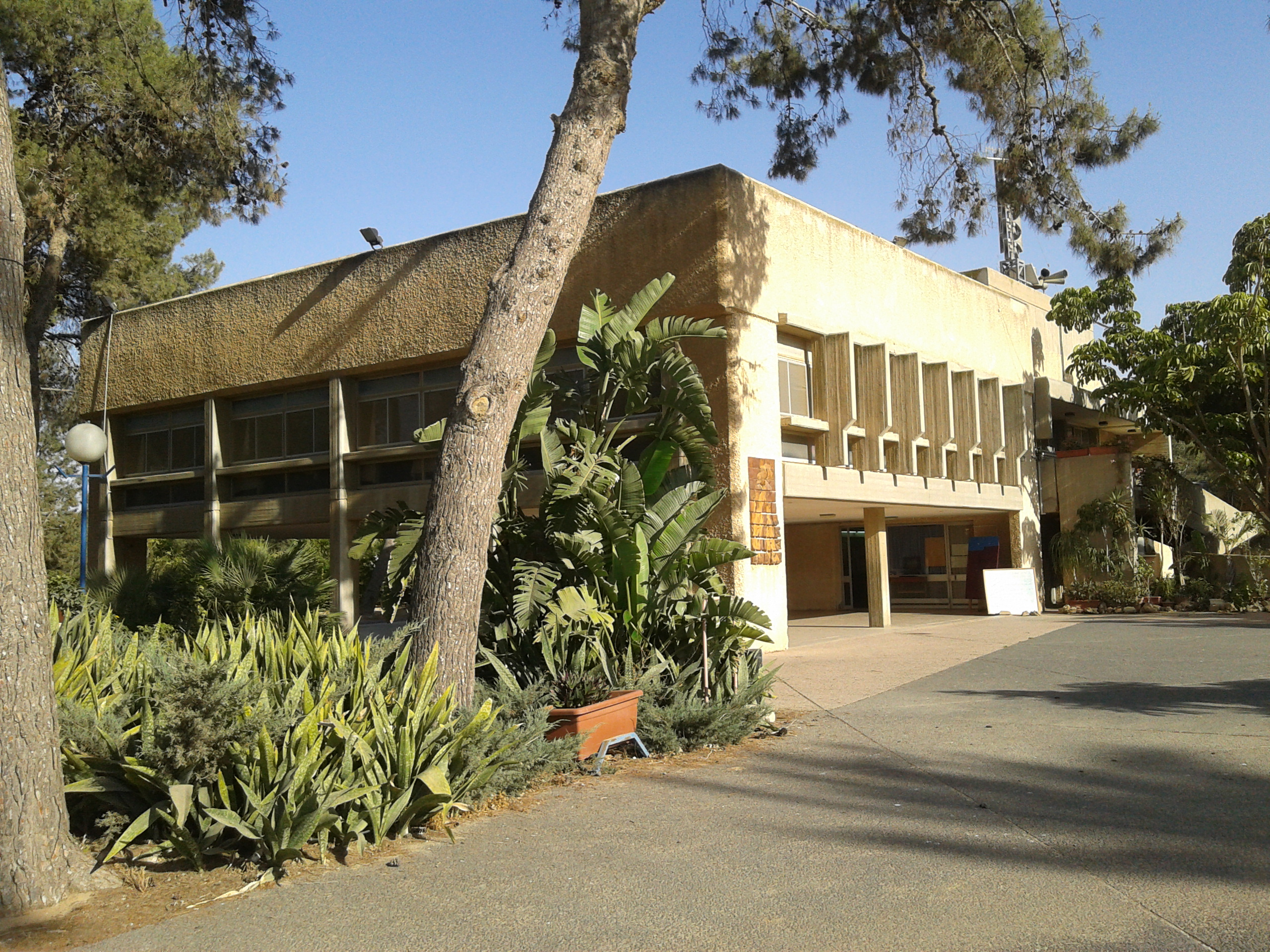
Urim communal dining hall in 2013

Kibbutz Urim was founded on 6 October 1946 as one of the 11 points in the Negev by a gar'in of young Jews from Bulgaria, later joined by North American members of Habonim. According to Walid Khalidi, Urim was established on land of the Palestinian village of Al-Imara. Al-Imara became depopulated in the 1948 Arab–Israeli War, and Urim was established about 1 km south of the village site.

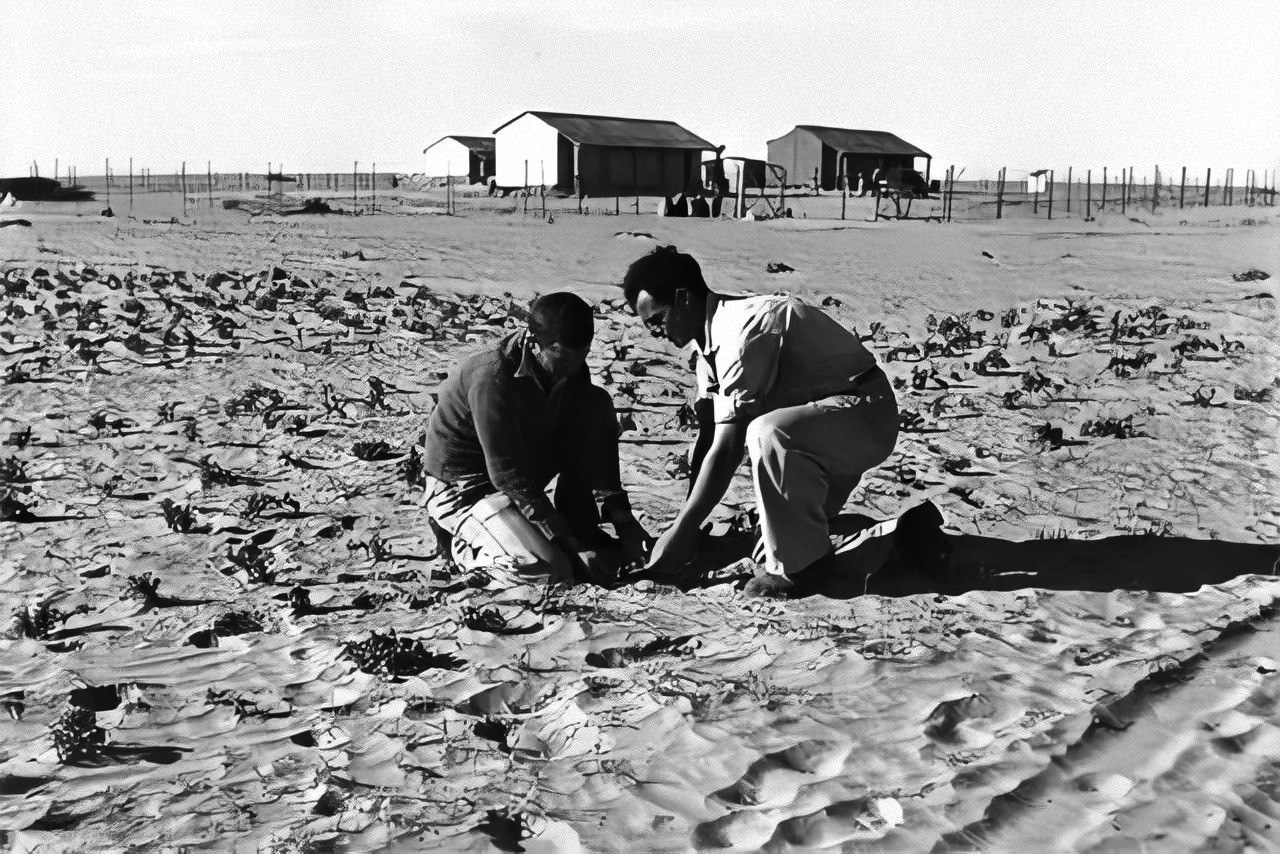
Kibbutz Urim in 1946

A Bedouin family near the gate of kibbutz Urim, 1946

== Economy ==
Kibbutz Urim operated a blanket factory that was devastated by fire in the 1980s. Today Noam Urim manufactures needle-punched nonwoven fabrics. Kibbutz Urim is a co-owner of Ora Field Crops, which is operates together with Kibbutz Kissufim also in the northwestern Negev. The cultivated area is about 27,000 dunam (almost 6,700 acres). Over two-thirds of the fields are irrigated from water sources supplied by water mains with hydraulic valves, communications and automation networks. Autumn crops include potatoes, carrots, radishes, wheat, barley and onions; spring crops include sunflowers, peanuts and corn. The summer crop is table grapes.

== Equine therapy project ==
Olympic equestrian Daniel Bluman has an equine therapy project in Israel that he operates in conjunction with Kibbutz Urim.

== Military ==
Near the kibbutz are the military bases of Unit 8200 of the Military Intelligence Directorate, unit 414 of the Combat Intelligence Collection Corps), and the Southern District of the Home Front Command. (Note: From אורים in Hebrew Wikipedia: "בסמוך לקיבוץ שוכנים בסיסים צבאיים של היחידות 8200, 414 ומחוז דרום של פיקוד העורף.")

=== October 7 attacks ===
In the October 7 Hamas attack on Israel in 2023, several locations near Urim were attacked. Allegedly, Hamas militants (al-Qassam) were looking for a particularly sensitive Unit 8200 military base known as "Yarkon" and got lost.

The kibbutzim's Equine therapy project project was also attacked. Bluman said:

This touches very close to home... I am both pro-Israel and pro-Palestine, because I am pro-life, pro-human rights, and unfortunately right now the only way to get to that is by eradicating Hamas and terrorists groups that are fighting religious wars.

Erez Kalderon from Kibbutz Nir Oz, a student in the equine therapy program, was kidnapped by Hamas when the boy was 11 years old, and was held hostage. In December 2023, for the first time since the attack on the program, the program was able to work with children.

== Notable residents ==
- J.J. Goldberg (born 1949), editor-in-chief of The Forward, U.S. bureau chief of The Jerusalem Report, managing editor of The Jewish Week.
- Yaacov Heller (born 1941), Israeli-American sculptor and jewelry designer
- Josie Katz (born 1940), singer, actress, dancer, and painter
