= PlanetHood =

Book by Benjamin B. Ferencz and Ken Keyes, Jr.

PlanetHood: The Key to Your Survival and Prosperity
- Author: Dr. Benjamin B. Ferencz, Ken Keyes, Jr.
- Language: English
- Subject: international law
- Publisher: Vision Books
- Publication date: 1988
- Publication place: United States
- Pages: 188 (first edition)

PlanetHood: The Key to Your Survival and Prosperity (2nd Ed.: PlanetHood: The Key to Your Future) was written by Benjamin B. Ferencz and Ken Keyes, Jr. in 1988. This non-copyrighted work was written to advance the argument for a system of international law complete with courts, enforcement, and an international congress. A central theme of the book is the threat to civilization posed by nuclear weapons.

It was written as sequel to The Hundredth Monkey (1982).

== Dr. Benjamin B. Ferencz ==
Dr. Benjamin B. Ferencz was a chief prosecutor in the Nuremberg war crimes trials. A graduate of Harvard Law School, he was Adjunct Professor of International Law at Pace University. He was also the founder of the Pace Peace Center and the author of many books on world peace.

== Ken Keyes, Jr. ==
Ken Keyes, Jr. was the author of The Hundredth Monkey, which awakened millions to our planetary predicament. He was also the author of Handbook to Higher Consciousness, which has over one million in print.

== Book ==
The authors start by highlighting some of the serious global problems facing humanity. They then proceed to show that a system of effective international law has been a developing trend historically, beginning with Franciscus de Victoria in 1526 through the establishment of a federalist government in the wake of the American Revolution and continuing to the present day.

Optimism is the central tone of the book and it was designed to inspire its readers into replacing what they call the "law of force" with the "force of law."
