= Prosecuting Evil =

2018 documentary film

Prosecuting Evil: The Extraordinary World of Ben Ferencz is a 2018 documentary directed by Barry Avrich. It is based on the life of Ben Ferencz, a Hungarian-American prosecutor who participated in the Nuremberg trials.

== Reception ==
The film has a score of 100% on review aggregator Rotten Tomatoes, based on 19 reviews.
