= Ben Ferencz =

American lawyer (1920–2023)

Benjamin Ferencz
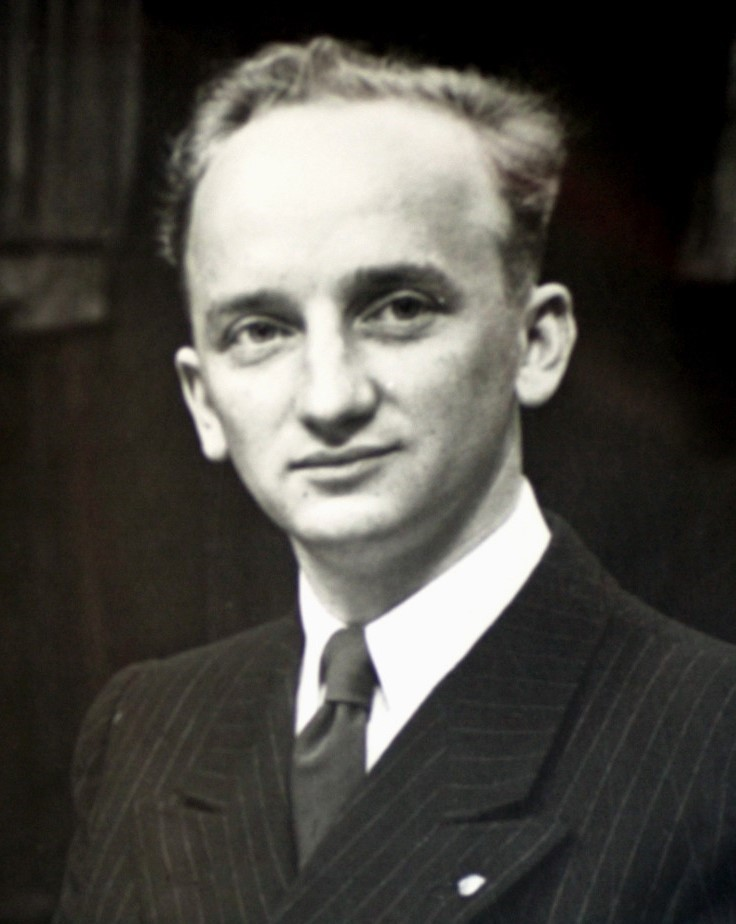
- Ferencz in c. 1947–1948
- Born: Benjamin Berell Ferencz; March 11, 1920; Nagysomkút, Hungary
- Died: April 7, 2023 (aged 103); Boynton Beach, Florida, U.S.
- Education: City College of New York (BA); Harvard University (LLB)
- Known for: Prosecutor at the Einsatzgruppen trial
- Spouse: Gertrude Fried (m. 1946; died 2019)
- Children: 4
- Military career
- Allegiance: United States
- Branch: United States Army
- Service years: 1943–1945
- Rank: Sergeant
- Conflicts: World War II

Benjamin Berell Ferencz (March 11, 1920 – April 7, 2023) was an American lawyer. He was an investigator of Nazi war crimes after World War II and the chief prosecutor for the United States Army at the Einsatzgruppen trial, one of the 12 subsequent Nuremberg trials held by US authorities at Nuremberg, Germany. When the Einsatzgruppen reports were discovered, Ferencz pushed for a trial based on their evidence. When confronted with a lack of staff and resources, he personally volunteered to serve as the prosecutor.

Later he became an advocate of international rule of law and for the establishment of an International Criminal Court. From 1985 to 1996, he was an adjunct professor of international law at Pace University.

== Early life and education ==
Ferencz was born on March 11, 1920, in Nagysomkút in the historical Transylvania region, into a Jewish family. A few months later the Treaty of Trianon allocated greater Transylvania, including Nagysomkút, to Romania from the Kingdom of Hungary. The new name of the town was Șomcuta Mare.

When Ferencz was ten months old, his family emigrated to the United States to avoid the persecution of Hungarian Jews by the Kingdom of Romania after Romania took control of Transylvania, Banat, Crisana, and Maramures.

The family settled in New York City, where they lived on the Lower East Side in Manhattan. Ferencz studied crime prevention at the City College of New York, and his criminal law exam result won him a scholarship to Harvard Law School. At Harvard, he studied under Roscoe Pound and also did research for Sheldon Glueck, who at that time was writing a book on war crimes. Ferencz graduated from Harvard Law in 1943.

== Career ==
After his studies, he joined the US Army. His time as a soldier in the army began with a job as a typist in Camp Davis in North Carolina; at that time, he did not know how to use a typewriter or fire a weapon. His job duties also included cleaning toilets and scrubbing pots and floors. In 1944, he served in the 115th AAA Gun Battalion, an anti-aircraft artillery unit. He fought in several major battles of the European theatre and was awarded five battle stars.

In 1945, he was transferred to the headquarters of General George S. Patton's Third Army, where he was assigned to a team tasked with setting up a war crimes branch and collecting evidence for such crimes. In that role, he was sent to the concentration camps the US Army had liberated.

=== Nuremberg trial prosecutor ===
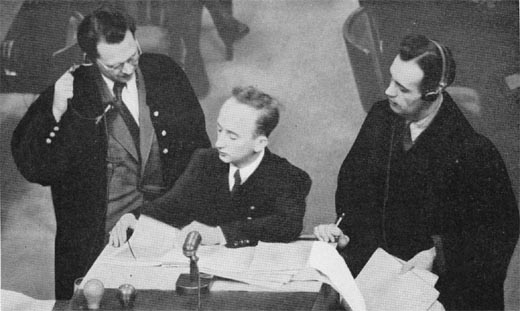
Friedrich Bergold (attorney for Ernst Biberstein), Ferencz, and Rudolf Aschenauer (attorney for Otto Ohlendorf) during the Einsatzgruppen Trial

On Christmas 1945, Ferencz was honorably discharged from the Army with the rank of sergeant. He returned to New York, but was recruited only a few weeks later to participate as a prosecutor (with the simulated rank of Colonel) on the legal team of Telford Taylor in the subsequent Nuremberg trials. Near the Tempelhof in a building belonging to the Ministry of Foreign Affairs in Berlin, in the spring of 1946, Ferencz found reports that described in detail, day by day, the Einsatzgruppen's killing of at least one million people from June 1941. Ferencz then flew to Nuremberg and demanded that the men be put on trial. Taylor hesitated, since there was a shortage of people and money. However, after Ferencz offered to personally handle the case, he agreed to have a trial held. Taylor appointed him chief prosecutor in the Einsatzgruppen case—Ferencz's first case. Of the 24 men he indicted, all were convicted; 13 of them received death sentences, of which four were eventually carried out. Apart from East Germany, they were the last executions performed on German soil, and in the Federal Republic.

In a 2005 interview for The Washington Post, he revealed some of his activities during his period in Germany by way of showing how different military legal norms were at the time:

Someone who was not there could never really grasp how unreal the situation was ... I once saw DPs [displaced persons] beat an SS man and then strap him to the steel gurney of a crematorium. They slid him in the oven, turned on the heat and took him back out. Beat him again, and put him back in until he was burnt alive. I did nothing to stop it. I suppose I could have brandished my weapon or shot in the air, but I was not inclined to do so. Does that make me an accomplice to murder? You know how I got witness statements? I'd go into a village where, say, an American pilot had parachuted and been beaten to death and line everyone one up against the wall. Then I'd say, "Anyone who lies will be shot on the spot." It never occurred to me that statements taken under duress would be invalid.

Ferencz stayed in Germany after the Nuremberg trials, together with his wife Gertrude, whom he had married in New York on March 31, 1946. Together with Kurt May and others, he participated in the setup of reparation and rehabilitation programs for the victims of Nazi persecution, and also had a part in the negotiations that led to the Reparations Agreement between Israel and West Germany signed on September 10, 1952, and the first German Restitution Law in 1953. In 1956, the family—they had four children by then—returned to the US, where Ferencz entered private law practice as a partner of Telford Taylor. While pursuing claims of Jewish forced laborers against the Flick concern (the subject of the Flick trial), Ferencz observed the "interesting phenomenon of history and psychology that very frequently the criminal comes to see himself as the victim".

=== Role in forming the International Criminal Court ===
Experiences just after World War II left a defining impression on Ferencz. After 13 years, and under the influence of the events of the Vietnam War, he left the private law practice and worked for the institution of an International Criminal Court that would serve as a worldwide highest instance for issues of crimes against humanity and war crimes.

He also published several books on this subject. Already in his first book, Defining International Aggression: The Search for World Peace (1975), he argued for the establishment of such an international court. From 1985 to 1996, Ferencz also worked as an adjunct professor of international law at Pace University at White Plains, New York.

An International Criminal Court was indeed established on July 1, 2002, when the Rome Statute of the International Criminal Court came into force. Under the Bush administration, the US signed the treaty, but did not ratify it. The administration concluded a large number of bilateral agreements with other states that excluded US citizens from being brought before the ICC.

Ferencz repeatedly argued against this procedure and suggested that the US join the ICC without reservations, as it was a long-established rule of law that "law must apply equally to everyone", also in an international context. In this vein, he suggested in an interview given on August 25, 2006, that not only Saddam Hussein should be tried, but also George W. Bush, because the US had begun the Iraq War without the UN Security Council's permission. He also suggested that Bush should be tried in the International Criminal Court for "269 war crime charges" related to the Iraq War.

In 2013, Ferencz again said that the "use of armed force to obtain a political goal should be condemned as an international and a national crime".

Ferencz wrote in 2018, in a preface to a book on the future of international justice, that "war-making itself is the supreme international crime against humanity and that it should be deterred by punishment universally, wherever and whenever offenders are apprehended".

=== Later years ===
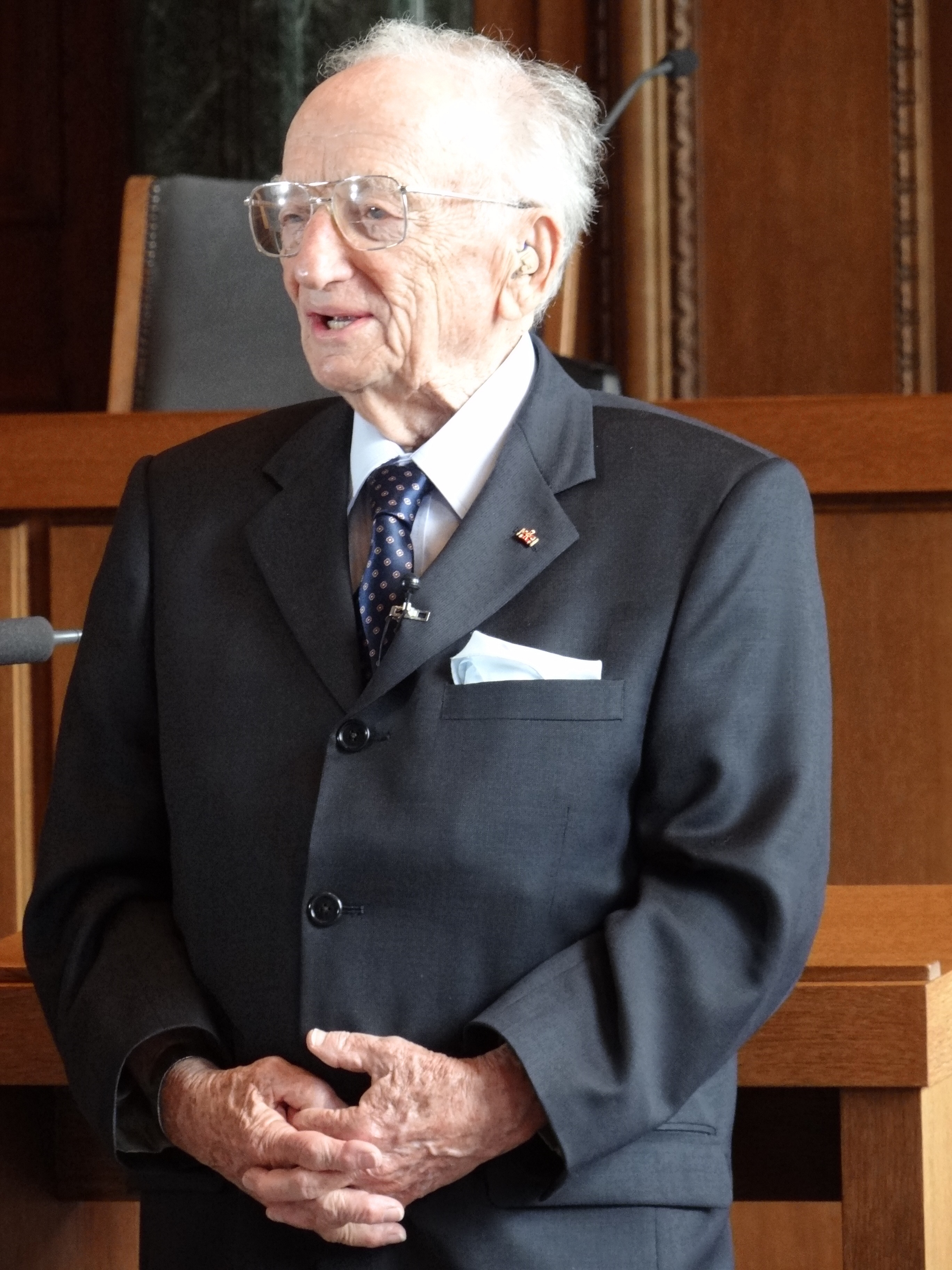
Ferencz in 2012

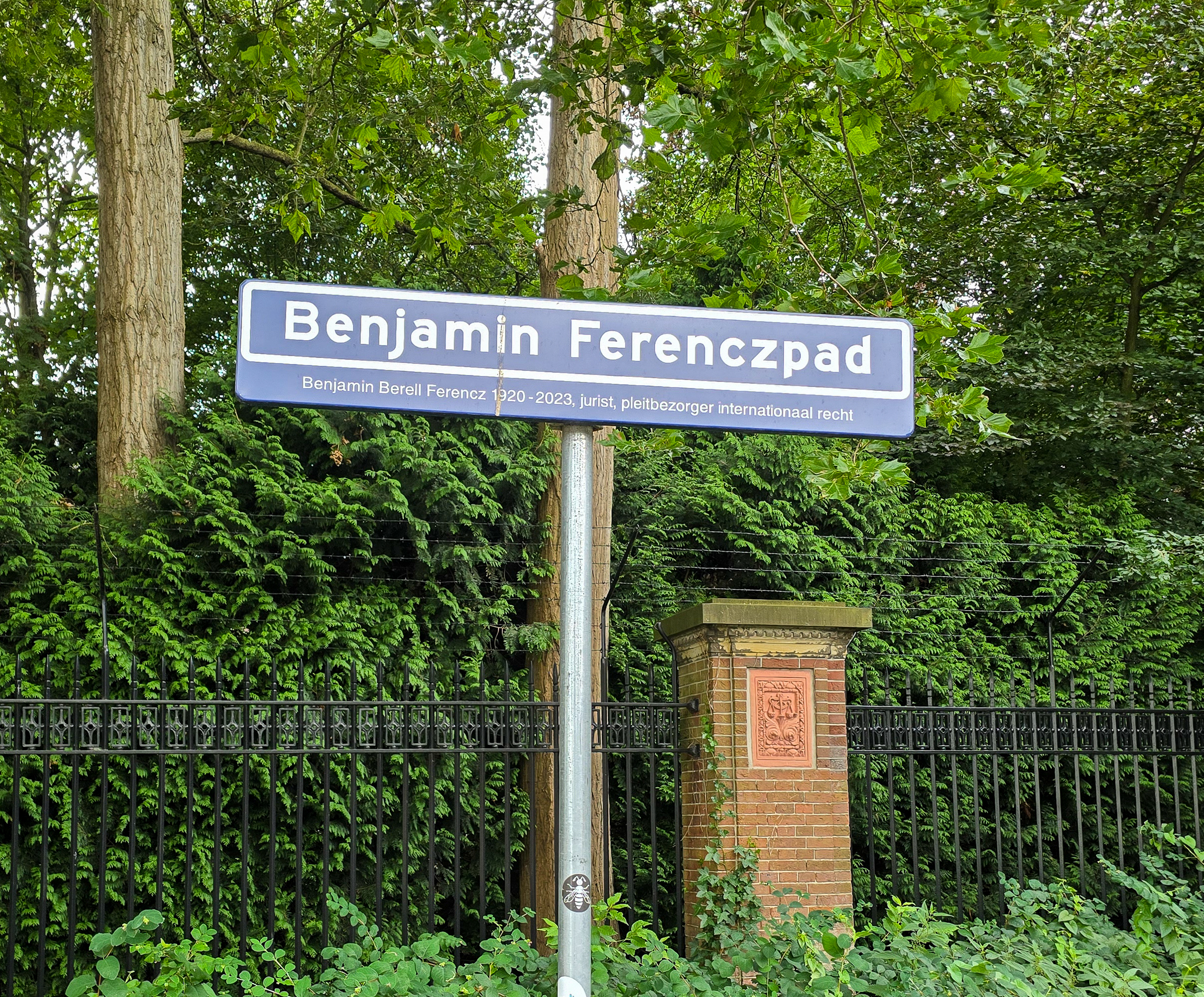
Benjamin Ferencz walkway in The Hague, in the vicinity of the Peace Palace

In 2009, Ferencz was awarded the Erasmus Prize, together with Antonio Cassese; the award is given to individuals or institutions that have made notable contributions to European culture, society, or social science.

On May 3, 2011, two days after the death of Osama bin Laden was reported, The New York Times published a Ferencz letter that argued that "illegal and unwarranted execution—even of suspected mass murderers—undermines democracy". Also that year he presented a closing statement in the trial of Thomas Lubanga Dyilo in Uganda.

On March 16, 2012, in another letter to the editor of The New York Times, Ferencz hailed the International Criminal Court's conviction of Thomas Lubanga as "a milestone in the evolution of international criminal law".

In April 2017, the municipality of The Hague announced the naming of the footpath next to the Peace Palace the Benjamin Ferenczpad ("Benjamin Ferencz Path"), calling him "one of the figureheads of international justice". The city's Deputy Mayor Saskia Bruines (International Affairs) traveled to Washington D.C. to symbolically present the street sign to Ferencz.

In 2018, Ferencz was the subject of a documentary on his life, Prosecuting Evil, by director Barry Avrich, which was made available on Netflix. In the same year, Ferencz was interviewed for the 2018 Michael Moore documentary Fahrenheit 11/9.

On June 20, 2019, artist and sculptor Yaacov Heller honored Ferencz—presenting him with a bust he created—commemorating his extraordinary life dedicated to genocide prevention.

On January 16, 2020, The New York Times printed Ferencz's letter denouncing the assassination of the Iranian general Qasem Soleimani, unnamed in the letter, as an "immoral action [and] a clear violation of national and international law". He became a centenarian two months later. Six months later on September 7, the documentary Two Heads Are Better Than One: Making of the Ben Ferencz Bust, starring Ferencz and sculptor Yaacov Heller, had a world premiere, produced by Eric Kline Productions and directed by Eric Kline.

On June 22, 2021, he became the first recipient of the Pahl Peace Prize in Liechtenstein.

In January 2022, Ferencz appeared as an interviewee in the German documentary Ganz normale Männer - Der "vergessene Holocaust" which was based on the book Ordinary Men - Reserve Police Battalion 101 and the Final Solution in Poland by Christopher Browning. An English language version of the documentary was released by Netflix in September 2023 as Ordinary Men - The "Forgotten Holocaust".

In March 2022, an audio clip of Ferencz was played during the eleventh emergency special session of the United Nations General Assembly and he later gave an interview to BBC Radio 4's The World Tonight on the Russian invasion of Ukraine. He said that Vladimir Putin should be "behind bars" for his war crimes, and that he was "heartbroken" over atrocities in Ukraine.

On April 7, 2022, Florida Governor Ron DeSantis awarded Ferencz the Governor's Medal of Freedom at a ceremony held at Florida Atlantic University.

In September 2022, Ferencz appeared in the Ken Burns documentary The U.S. and the Holocaust.

In December 2022, Ferencz was awarded the Congressional Gold Medal.

In January 2023, Ferencz appeared in the David Wilkinson documentary Getting Away with Murder(s).

In March 2023, in one of his last public appearances, Ferencz presented a video clip of welcome to participants at The Nuremberg Principles: The Contemporary Challenges Conference, an event sponsored by the Institute for Policy Research and Catholic Studies at the Catholic University of America.

== Personal life ==
In 1946, Ferencz married his girlfriend, Gertrude Fried, in New York. For a total of 73 years, they were married "without a quarrel" until her death in 2019. They had four children.

Ferencz died at an assisted living facility in Boynton Beach, Florida, on April 7, 2023, at the age of 103. He was the last surviving prosecutor at the Nuremberg trials.

== Philanthropy ==
In 2016, it was revealed by the Associated Press that Ferencz donated $1 million to the U.S. Holocaust Memorial Museum's genocide prevention center and had earmarked a further $1 million to the Simon-Skjodt Center for the Prevention of Genocide, plus the option for an annual gift renewable for up to $10 million per year. According to a 2017 interview with Lesley Stahl on 60 Minutes, Ferencz pledged to will his life savings to genocide prevention initiatives.

== Selected bibliography ==
- Parting Words (Hardcover), Benjamin Ferencz, Published by Little, Brown Book Group, London, 2020; ISBN 9780751579918
- Ferencz, B.: "The 'Immoral' Killing of the Iranian General", New York Times Letter to Editor, January 16, 2020.
- Ferencz, B.: "Kriegsverbrechen, Restitution, Prävention. Aus dem Vorlass von Benjamin B. Ferencz", ed. by Constantin Goschler, Marcus Böick, Julia Reus, Göttingen 2019 (collection of documents, open access).
- Ferencz, B.: Mémoires de Ben, procureur à Nuremberg et avocat de la paix mondiale, (an autobiography), Michalon, Paris, 2012. ISBN 978-2841866748
- Ferencz, B.: New Legal Foundations for Global Survival: Security Through the Security Council, Oceana 1994; ISBN 0-379-21207-2.
- Ferencz, B.: Keyes, K. Jr.: Planethood: The Key to Your Future, Vision Books 1988. Reprint 1991; ISBN 0-915972-21-2.
- Ferencz, B.: A Common Sense Guide to World Peace, Oceana 1985. ISBN 9780379207972
- Ferencz, B.: Enforcing International Law: A Way to World Peace, Oceana 1983. ISBN 0379121476
- Ferencz, B.: Less Than Slaves: Jewish Forced Labor and the Quest for Compensation, Harvard 1979. Reprint 2002, Indiana University Press & USHMM; ISBN 0-253-21530-7.
- Ferencz, B.: An International Criminal Court: A Step Toward World Peace, Oceana 1980. ISBN 0-379-20389-8.
- Ferencz, B.: Defining International Aggression: The Search for World Peace, Oceana 1975. ISBN 0-379-00271-X.

== Lectures ==
- "The Evolution of International Criminal Law – A Personal Account" in the Lecture Series of the United Nations Audiovisual Library of International Law

== Awards ==
- 1980: National Jewish Book Award in the Holocaust category for Less Than Slaves: Jewish Forced Labor and the Quest for Compensation
- 2018: Medal of Honour of the International Association of Prosecutors
- 2020: Inaugural recipient of the Bolch Judicial Institute of Duke Law's Lemkin Medal
- 2021: Honorary Doctorate awarded by the faculty of law of the University of Cologne
- 2021: Awardee of the Pahl Peace Prize in Liechtenstein
- 2022: Governor's Medal of Freedom of the State of Florida

== See also ==
- International Criminal Court and the 2003 invasion of Iraq
- List of peace activists
- Kampala Conference to review the Rome Statute
- United States and the International Criminal Court
