= Al-Imara =

Palestinian village, depopulated in 1948

al-Imara العمارة
- Etymology: "the Building"
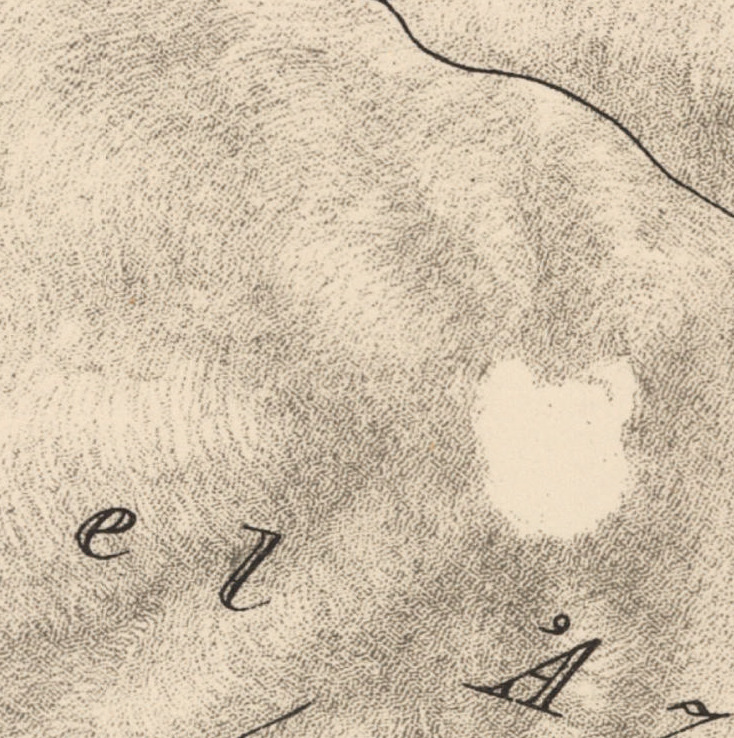
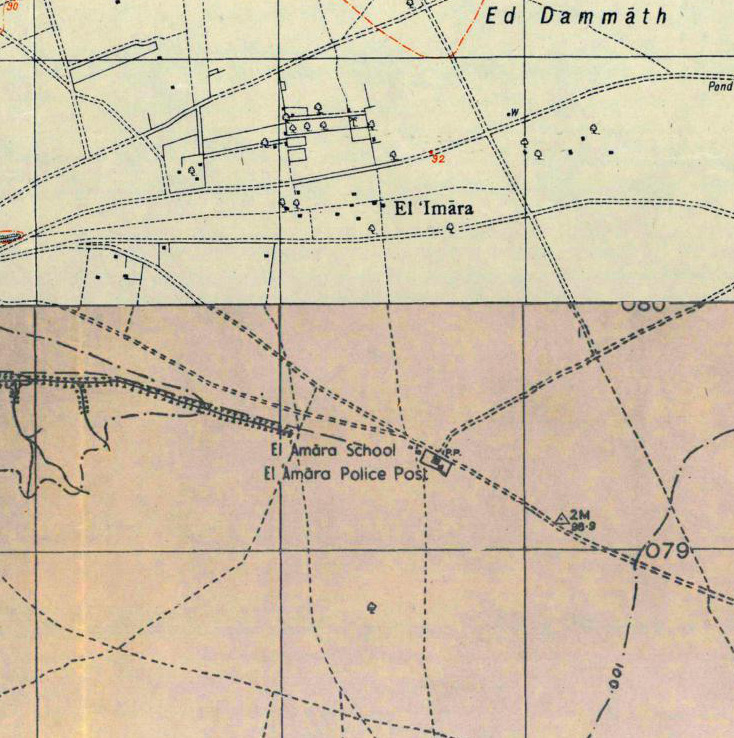
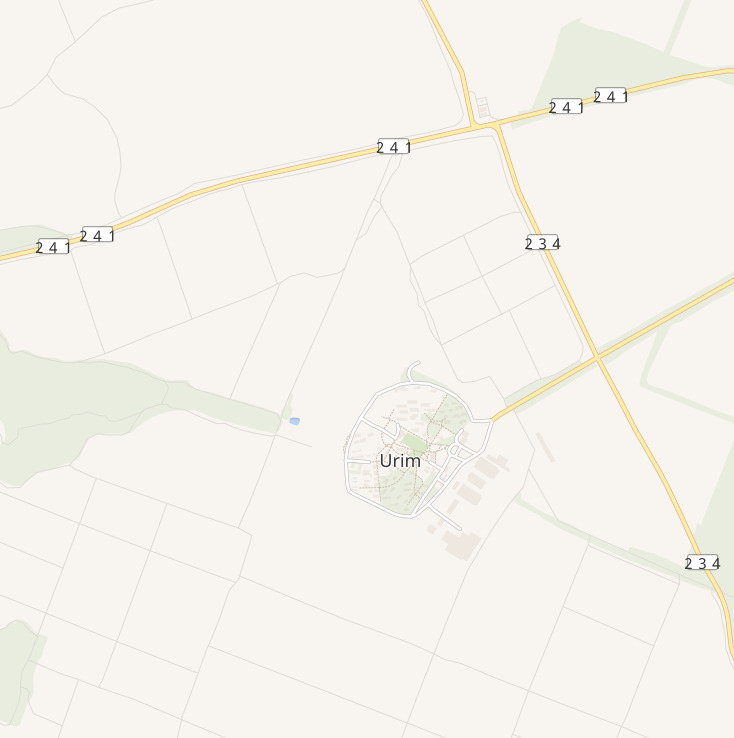
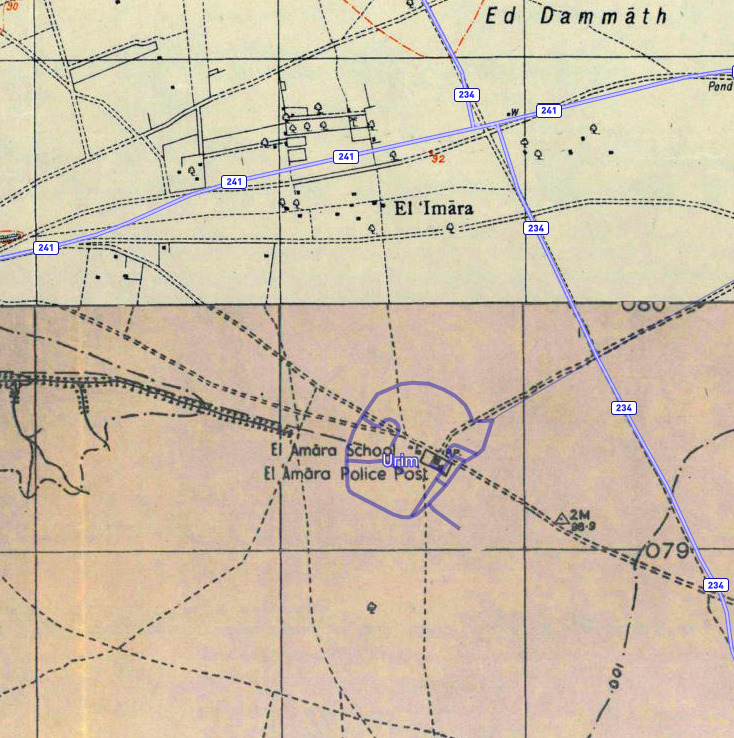
- 1870s map 1940s map modern map 1940s with modern overlay map A series of historical maps of the area around Al-Imara (click the buttons)

- Location within Mandatory Palestine
- Coordinates: 31°18′11″N 34°31′14″E
- Palestine grid: 104/080
- Geopolitical entity: Mandatory Palestine
- Subdistrict: Beersheba
- Date of depopulation: October 1948
- Cause(s) of depopulation: Expulsion by Yishuv forces
- Current Localities: Urim Ofakim

al-Imara (Arabic: العمارة), was a Palestinian village, located in the northern Negev Desert 27 kilometers (17 mi) northwest of Beersheba.

== History ==
In the British mandate period the village was classified as a hamlet by the Palestine Index Gazetteer.

=== Post-1948 ===
During the 1948 Arab-Israeli War, the village was captured by the Yiftach Brigade in early October, meeting with no resistance. The Jewish kibbutz of Urim is built on the lands of the former village, being approximately 1 kilometer (0.62 mi) south of the original village site.

The Palestinian historian Walid Khalidi, described the village remains in 1992: "The village site has been completely built over by the kibbutz of Urim. Although the kibbutz was established in 1946 near the village of Al-Imara, during the 1948 Arab-Israeli War, it was moved to the site of the former British police station. About 2 km southeast of the current kibbutz there are remains of several stone structures. These were the houses that belonged to Bedouin families before 1948 and were not considered part of al-Imara.

== See also ==
- Depopulated Palestinian locations in Israel

== Bibliography ==
- Khalidi, W. (1992). All That Remains: The Palestinian Villages Occupied and Depopulated by Israel in 1948. Washington D.C.: Institute for Palestine Studies. ISBN 0-88728-224-5.
- Morris, B. (2004). The Birth of the Palestinian Refugee Problem Revisited. Cambridge University Press. ISBN 978-0-521-00967-6.
