= Pahl Peace Prize =

Pahl Peace Prize Foundation
- Formation: 2018
- Founder: Jochem O. W. Pahl
- Type: Nonprofit
- Purpose: The purpose of the Pahl Peace Prize Foundation is the granting of an annual peace prize, consisting of a gold medal and a cash prize. This prize will be awarded to outstanding individuals who have considerably and actively contributed to world peace.
- Location: Principality of Liechtenstein
- Website: https://www.pahlpeaceprize.com/en/
- Remarks: The prize was granted for the first time in 2021.

The Pahl Peace Prize is awarded annually to outstanding individuals who have considerably and actively contributed to world peace, funded by Mr. Jochem O.W. Pahl. The annual prize was first granted in 2021 in the Principality of Liechtenstein. It comes with a monetary award of EUR 100.000 and a specifically designed gold medal.

== Prize and medal ==
The Pahl Peace Prize Foundation was founded in 2018 in the Principality of Liechtenstein. The purpose of the Pahl Peace Prize Foundation is the granting of an annual peace prize, consisting of a gold medal and a cash prize of up to EUR 100.000. This prize will be awarded to outstanding individuals who have considerably and actively contributed to world peace. The prize was granted for the first time in the year 2021 in the Principality of Liechtenstein.

== Background ==
The Pahl Peace Prize symbolizes the lifetime achievements of Mr. Jochem O.W. Pahl. who strived to make a difference – for humanity and world peace. During his world-wide travels, he was motivated by his perceptions of misfortune, moving him to contribute to a better world: “Every human, regardless of race, color, religion or education has a right to appreciation and esteem.” He bequeathed his whole estate to the Foundation and instructed in his will the creation of the Pahl Peace Prize to honor and support individuals who have contributed to world peace in an extraordinary manner.

== Award winners ==
Year	Image	Winner	Citation	Publications
2021		Benjamin Ferencz	The Peace Prize honored Benjamin Ferencz for his lifelong commitment to peace.	Liechtensteiner Vaterland Liechtensteiner Volksblatt www.cbsnews.com
2022		Liselotte Latrous	The Peace Prize honored Lotti Latrous for her dignity of the poorest in the highest regard.	Liechtensteiner Vaterland Liechtensteiner Volksblatt Liewo and Radio L
2023		Izzeldin Abuelaish	The Peace Prize honored Izzeldin Abuelaish for his commitment to peace, reconciliation and human dignity in the Middle East.	
