= Ken Keyes Jr. =

American personal growth author (1921–1995)

Ken Keyes Jr. (January 19, 1921 – December 20, 1995) was an American personal growth author and lecturer, and the creator of the Living Love method, a self-help system. Keyes wrote fifteen books on personal growth and social consciousness issues, representing about four million copies distributed overall.

== Early life ==
=== Childhood and adolescence ===
Keyes was born an only child to an affluent family in Atlanta. Throughout their lives, he was close to his father and especially to his mother, despite her eventual abuse of alcohol. He suffered from chronic bronchitis and croup in his infant years, and in 1925 his family moved to Miami Beach, Florida, in hopes of his benefiting from its sunny climate. His father, Kenneth Keyes Sr., became successful in real estate development there and active in the conservative evangelical wing of the Presbyterian Church. Keyes was not very athletic as a child, but excelled in academics and developed hobbies, such as photography. When he was in high school, his father bought him a small boat, which began his lifelong interest in sailing.

Keyes attributed the seeds of the personal growth system he would later develop to an experience he had with a stern English teacher in ninth grade. Despite her reputation as a strict teacher and hard grader, he made an effort to be personally caring toward her, which led to her giving him a slight break in grading. He took the lesson from this experience to be "that when I express caring and friendliness, they are reflected back to me in life."

=== College, military service, and a new family ===
Keyes entered Duke University in 1938 and spent two years there. He then studied voice and music at the University of Miami, and helped to found the Miami Opera Guild. In 1941, during the World War II era, Keyes enlisted in a naval intelligence unit set up to censor cablegrams entering and leaving the United States.

At age of 20, Keyes met his first wife, Roberta Rymer, at the University of Miami. They were married in December 1941, a few days after the attack on Pearl Harbor. Their first child, Ken III, was born in December 1942, and their second child, Clara Lu, was born in April 1944. Keyes was discharged from the service in October 1945, and entered the real estate business with his father.

When he was around 23, he photographed and filmed Alfred Korzybski at the Institute of General Semantics, helping to document Korzybski's life. Apparently he was already greatly involved in the logical aspects of self-help.

=== Polio and quadriplegia ===
In February 1946, at age 25, Keyes contracted polio and became paralyzed in his legs and hands. His paralysis developed into quadriplegia and was sufficiently severe that, for example, he was unable to turn himself over in bed. He was admitted to the Warm Springs Foundation, a convalescent hospital in Georgia. After a year in the hospital, he moved with his wife to a nearby house for three more years of rehabilitation, during which time he adjusted to life as a wheelchair user. He invented a switch-activated powered bed that would turn his body over. He said he "began to develop the feeling that I did not have to be so totally dependent on other people" and "still wanted to feel that I was a capable and lovable person." To that end, he obtained a lever-controlled electric wheelchair, a new invention at the time.

Keyes required aides for bodily care for several decades.

=== First book ===
According to Keyes, he became involved in many activities to overcome the feeling of dependence and uselessness brought on by his disability. He wrote a book on mental techniques for increasing effectiveness in daily life. This book, entitled How to Develop Your Thinking Ability, was published by McGraw-Hill in 1950, and contained illustrations by cartoonist Ted Key. Keyes later reacquired the publishing rights to the book and re-released it as Taming Your Mind.

In a subsequent book, Discovering The Secrets of Happiness, Keyes commented, about this period of his life, that his disability may have been a disguised blessing:

"Perhaps I would have been so caught up in the business and social rat race that I wouldn't have sat still long enough to study my security, sensation and power illusions — and then discover how to deal with them so I could open up my heart to loving more. My reality is that I am far too busy and involved in my life activities to have time to concern myself with self-consciousness in the wheelchair department. Today I view my so-called 'handicap' as another gift my life has offered me."

=== Life after polio therapy ===
Upon completion of therapy in 1949, Keyes returned to South Miami, Florida, where he resumed work in real estate and bought a specially equipped speedboat for racing.

By 1950, Keyes was the general manager of a radio station owned by his father, and started his own commercial real estate business. Completing his schooling, he received a B.A. in psychology from the University of Miami. He planned and built a series of personal residences, and in 1956 bought a 71-foot yacht, the Caprice, capable of serving as a floating residence.

=== Divorce and remarriage ===
Over these years, Keyes indicates that he and his wife were drifting apart, and he had affairs with other women. He and Rymer separated and then divorced in 1959, after eighteen years of marriage. He received the yacht in the property settlement and moved his residence and office there. His second book, on the topic of nutrition and entitled, How to Live Longer–Stronger–Slimmer (later to be retitled, Loving Your Body), was published by Fredrick Fell during this period.

Around 1964, Keyes resumed working for his father in a real estate company targeted at foreign investors. At age 44, he met and married his second wife, Bonita, who was sixteen years his junior. During this period he wrote his third book with Jacque Fresco, a book on futurism entitled Looking Forward.

According to Keyes, his wife Bonita's jealousy and depression became major stumbling blocks in their relationship, and Keyes would later fault himself for what he describes as his unskilled responses to these issues. Keyes and Bonita divorced after a year of marriage, and Keyes grieved the loss of the relationship.

In 1968, Keyes established a national commercial real estate sales operation, with revenues of $25 million during its first year of operation. He maintained romantic relationships with various women, and would later comment that his sexual appetite had been an impediment to his personal growth.

== Spirituality and personal growth ==
In 1970, just before his 50th birthday, Keyes traveled to the Esalen Institute in California and enrolled in two workshops there. He then returned to Florida, became involved with the Humanistic Psychology Association and was exposed to teachings such as those of Chogyam Trungpa and Alan Watts. He also experimented briefly with mescaline, which, he reported, induced in him a continuously orgasmic experience he found distasteful. He credited this experience with allowing him to begin overcoming his obsession with sex, although he would remain sexually active throughout his life.

Keyes lived for a few months with two students who had been influenced by Trungpa and Ram Dass. He traveled with them to a commune and a Trappist monastery in Virginia and a spiritual center in Connecticut. A turning point came for Keyes when he visited Trungpa at his center in Barnet, Vermont at Christmas 1970 and discussed with Trungpa the Buddhist notion that the mind's reaction rather than external circumstances creates personal unhappiness. Keyes has said that he felt this to be the solution to the life problems he had experienced.

Over the next year, Keyes lived with a small group of people on his yacht, and prepared to turn his business over to an employee and found a nonprofit organization with his other assets. At this time he had a brief experience he described as transcendent, "like the pure energy of God—radiant, indescribable—and I felt a part of it all."

According to Keyes, during this period he used his new learning to cope more successfully with issues of jealousy and deception in his romantic relationship with a woman named Jane. During an episode in which Jane brought another lover onto his yacht, he used a form of mental reprogramming process that, he says, alleviated his jealously without repressing it, a method he would later teach. During this time he formulated the "Twelve Pathways", which would constitute the core of his "Living Love" method of personal growth. Within a month he had drafted the core of a new book, Handbook to Higher Consciousness.

== Living Love years ==
=== Going west, and the Living Love Center in Berkeley ===
In mid-1972, Keyes outfitted a bus for living, sold his yacht, disposed of most of his possessions, and began traveling west with a group of other people, visiting places such as Taos, New Mexico, and the Rainbow Gathering at Rocky Mountain National Park in Colorado. He traveled for about a year, and while traveling began holding sessions using the Living Love methods.

Keyes gave his first formal workshop on the Living Love methods at the Esalen Institute. He settled in Berkeley, California, in 1973 and began giving regular workshops, establishing the Living Love Center there in June 1973 in a former fraternity house. The workshops were attended by as many as fifty people at a time. Keyes recruited a staff from the streets of Berkeley at essentially volunteer wages to support the workshops, which he also began giving in Los Angeles. At this time, the Handbook to Higher Consciousness was selling about fifty thousand copies a year, and his workshops attracted students from all over the country. In 1974, Keyes banned drug use from the Center. He wrote more books and they began to sell rapidly. His staff, which included Shakti Gawain, Tolly Burkan, and Summer Raven, worked on the workshops and activities such as writing songs to go along with them.

=== Cornucopia in Kentucky ===
Having outgrown the Berkeley center, in mid-1977 the organization bought a 150-acre (607,000 m^{2}) property in St. Mary, Kentucky, that had been a Catholic seminary. The organization moved to the new property, which it renamed "Cornucopia."

Soon after the move, conflict developed between Keyes and the organization's head administrator and training director, Carole Thompson. Keyes had hired her in Berkeley, but, he said, he later thought she was influencing the staff in unhelpful directions. According to Keyes, she refused to allocate staff to him for the workshops he led, and he felt she was trying to edge him out of teaching and into the financial side of the operation. Similar "power moves" occurred during the Berkeley years, inevitable byproducts of a growing organization. Ken dealt openly with these issues using methods that he taught to keep the organization and vision on track.

The three week-long retreats during this time without Ken included such things as eating vegetarian meals, doing "karma yoga" work (chores) around the grounds, daily workshops based on The Handbook to Higher Consciousness principles, and watching the Franco Zeffirelli film, Brother Sun, Sister Moon, about the life of St. Francis of Assisi. These practices had been a part of daily life at the Berkeley house, and all residents participated. The goals were to expose participants to teamwork and health consciousness while supporting day-to-day organizational functions.

One of the more interesting exercises, also practiced in Berkeley, occurred when participants randomly selected a partner (done by forming two circles, one inside the other, with the outer circle moving clockwise, and until the leader said "stop" forcing people to choose diametrically opposite partners). A four-foot piece of cord was given to each "couple," and each was told to tie one end to his or her wrist. Thus, partners were literally tied together for the next 24 to 48 hours. It was a complication to use the bathroom, especially if one's partner was of the opposite sex (usually, one person would enter a stall while the other person slid the string between the crack in the door and waited outside). The purpose of the exercise was that partners had to work together and communicate in order to go anywhere or do anything. Adding to the "we are all brothers and sisters" theme was that all the bathrooms and showers at Cornucopia were co-ed, though the expectation was for there to be no sexual contact, unless one was in a pre-existing relationship.

Another exercise was called "The Marathon" where the group participants would stay-up and be in groups for 24 to 36 hours with occasional breaks along with normal meals. During these Marathons there was usually a "Talent Show" with each group member do a bit or with another group member or two.The idea of these various processes---"The String Game" or "The Marathon" was to bring up and trigger security, sensation or power needs/addictions that participants had about the way a particular thing "should/ought" to be, or how it "shouldn't" be for them to work on for their growth of being liberated from past "conditioning" about the way things should or shouldn't be in the world, or in ones' life.

Additionally, near the end of the workshop, all people participated in an exercise requiring them to take off all their clothes, stand before the group naked, and share what they did not like about their body. Some had no problem with the exercise and for others it proved quite challenging to be able to let go of all the negative opinions many held regarding their own body images.

=== "On retreat" in Santa Cruz ===
In March 1978, with six other people, Keyes left Cornucopia in the administrator's charge and moved back to Santa Cruz, California, a move he later characterized as an unskillful withdrawal from the problem. He considered the level of teaching quality at Cornucopia after his departure to have lowered and become uneven. Debts at Cornucopia began to increase.

When Keyes left on a live-in bus with some staff that volunteered in March 1978, he had them go through a 'growth process' where they all had to shave their heads, and if male, their facial hair too. In addition they all were to use just one toothbrush and wear the same clothes with just one change for the time on the bus. It was reported that this process ended prematurely when the participants refused to continue.

On a visit back to Cornucopia in November 1978, Keyes became involved with Penny Hannig, an acquaintance of several years and a main workshop leader at the center, and she joined him in Santa Cruz in 1979. She became his third wife in September 1984.

Keyes remained in Santa Cruz for three years. He describes this period of his life as being "on retreat." During these years, the couple "lived in a pattern of voluntary simplicity." He received Social Security disability benefits and received room, board, medical care, and a vacation from the organization, but he took no salary and received no royalties from his books. He received an inheritance from his mother's estate, most of which he donated to the organization. He continued to write books, some of which Penny co-wrote.

Penny cared for his physical needs, and they were quite close, remaining in each other's company almost continually. Bouts of depression and hostility Penny experienced over a period of about two years during this time were initially mysterious, but the couple eventually diagnosed these symptoms as being the result of food allergies. After a change in her diet, the symptoms were brought under control.

=== Coos Bay, Oregon, and the Ken Keyes College ===
In 1982, the leader with whom Keyes had clashed left Cornucopia, taking much of the staff with her. The organization sold the Cornucopia property and relocated along with Keyes to Coos Bay, Oregon, in an old four-story hospital building. They chose Coos Bay because it was said to be a place least likely to be attacked in a nuclear war. There they continued to give workshops and write books for about four years, before deciding to open a formal training school for the Living Love method, which they called the Ken Keyes College. The first enrolled group numbered almost a hundred.

In 1982, Keyes published The Hundredth Monkey, a book about how to prevent nuclear war.

Late in 1986, during the college's first nine-month training course, Keyes developed pneumonia. He was admitted to the hospital and eventually put on a ventilator. He credited his use of the Living Love methods with enabling him to summon the strength and serenity to remain calm and upbeat about his situation and to visualize healing for his lungs. Although there had initially been some doubt about his physical viability, he was able to come off the respirator and breathe again on his own. He left the hospital and resumed training the inaugural group of students at the college, who graduated in May 1987.

With international lawyer Benjamin Ferencz, Keyes wrote another book on world politics, PlanetHood.

== Final years ==
Keyes and Penny eventually were divorced and the Ken Keyes College closed. In 1990, Keyes began studying inner-child healing and the rapid-eye-movement therapy developed by Francine Shapiro. He established the Caring Rapid Healing Center in Coos Bay to do private multi-day counseling workshops in this area, and wrote his final book, Your Road Map to Lifelong Happiness, on these topics.

Keyes married a fourth wife, Lydia, who survived him. He died of kidney failure in 1995. He was also survived by his children, Ken Keyes III and Clara Hardin.

== Influence and legacy ==
In his life Keyes sold or distributed millions of books, lectured to many people, spoke to dignitaries at political gatherings, and knew and moved among the self-help elite, including Wayne Dyer, who said that Keyes "literally got me started on this glorious transformational journey." His books are still available thirteen years after his death, and a small group of his students maintain ties and carry on his methods. However, Keyes' organization essentially died with him.

Keyes employed no explicit strategies to ensure his organization would continue or grow without him, and he did nothing that would promote any established organization or personal legacy. He focused, instead, on teaching his methods. He never sought out a major publisher for his books, but self-published them all, and even brought back in-house one book that had been placed with a major publisher. Of the three teaching centers he founded, only the last was eponymous.

== Published works ==
=== Autobiography ===
- 1989: Discovering the Secrets of Happiness: My Intimate Story. ISBN 0-915972-15-8.

=== Nutrition ===
- 1966: How to live longer, stronger, slimmer. LOC RA784 .K4 (no ISBN).
- 1974: Loving Your Body. ISBN 0-9600688-4-8.

=== Personal growth ===
==== Living Love method ====
- 1972: Handbook to Higher Consciousness. ISBN 0-9600688-8-0.
- With Tolly Burkan and Bruce T. Keyes, 1974: How to Make Your Life Work, or, Why Aren't You Happy? ISBN 0-915972-08-5
- 1979: A Conscious Person's Guide to Relationships. ISBN 0-915972-00-X.
- 1982: Prescriptions for Happiness. ISBN 0-915972-02-6.
- 1984: How To Enjoy Your Life In Spite Of It All. ISBN 0-915972-01-8.
- 1987: Your Life Is A Gift: So Make the Most of It! ISBN 0-915972-12-3.
- With Penny Keyes, 1988: Gathering Power Through Insight and Love. ISBN 0-915972-13-1.
- With Penny Keyes, 1989: Handbook to Higher Consciousness: The Workbook. ISBN 0-915972-16-6.
- With Penny Keyes, 1990: The Power of Unconditional Love: 21 Guidelines for Beginning, Improving, and Changing Your Most Meaningful Relationships. ISBN 0-915972-19-0

==== Other methods ====
- 1970: Taming Your Mind. ISBN 0-915972-18-2. (originally "How to Develop Your Thinking Ability" 1950)
- 1995: Your Road Map to Lifelong Happiness: A Guide to the Life You Want. ISBN 0-915972-22-0.

=== Politics and futurism ===
- With Jacque Fresco, 1969: Looking Forward. ISBN 0-498-06752-1.
- 1982: The Hundredth Monkey. ISBN 0-942024-01-X.
- With Benjamin B. Ferencz, 1991: Planethood: The Key to Your Future. ISBN 0-915972-21-2.
