= Lotti Latrous =

Swiss healthcare worker and philanthropist

Liselotte "Lotti" Latrous (born 1953) is a Swiss healthcare worker and philanthropist who since the late 1990s has dedicated her life to caring for HIV/AIDS patients and their children in facilities created near Abidjan in the Ivory Coast. As a result, she was honoured as the Swiss Woman of the Year in 2004 and in 2022 she received the Pahl Peace Prize from Liechtenstein.

== Biography ==
Born in Dielsdorf near Zürich in 1953, Latrous was brought up in nearby Regensberg.

While working as a 16-year-old au pair in Geneva, she met her husband-to-be Aziz Latrous, who was studying engineering. When he left to take case of his family in Tunisia, Latrous gave up training as a nurse and worked as a care assistant so that she could provide financial support for her boyfriend and family. After Aziz completed his studies, they married and he embarked on an international career with the Nestlé food and drink company. Together with their three children, the couple spent several years in both Saudi Arabia and Egypt where Lotti found work as a volunteer.

== Work in the Ivory Coast ==
In 1994, they moved to Abidjan in the Ivory Coast. As Latrous wanted to continue working as a volunteer, she jointed the local Women's Association. In 1997, the Swiss ambassador's wife took her to visit the Missionary Sisters of Charity in the shantytown district of Koumassi. She was shocked to see how the patients, many of them women and children, were just being left to die from HIV/AIDS. From then on, she returned every day to care for the sick and comfort those who were dying. She later discovered even worse conditions in the Vridi-Canal shantytown district.

In 1999, with her husband's assistance, Lotti opened an ambulatory, using containers for outpatient care. As a result of pressure from local inhabitants fearing AIDS infection, facilities were moved to a new location with a dispensary and, in 2002, a hospice where she was able to bring dignity to the dying. She went on to create a 50-bed orphanage and accommodation for 500 women and children. In 2016, all the facilities were again moved, this time to the Grand-Bassam district, under the name Centre L'Espoir (Hope Centre). As of late 2019, the centre employed some 80 people, including doctors, nurses, medical specialists and support staff. Over 5,000 HIV/AIDS patients had been treated there.

In recent years, after her husband was first transferred to Cairo and then retired to Geneva, Lotti Latrous divided her time between life with the family and regular visits to the Ivory Coast. In 2019, after completely recovering from tuberculosis, she reported she hoped to be able to spend more time in Grand-Bassam.

== Honours and awards ==
Latrous has earned a number of significant awards:

- 2002: Adele-Duttweiler Prize of Switzerland
- 2005: Swiss Woman of the Year
- 2009: Elisabeth Norgall Prize from the Women's Club, Frankfurt
- 2022: Pahl Peace Prize, Liechtenstein
