= Count and Countess de Hoernle =

Philanthropic couple

Adolfe de Hoernle
- Born: May 10, 1902; Pforzheim, Germany
- Died: September 10, 1998 (aged 96)
- Burial place: Forest Lawn Memorial Gardens North, Pompano Beach, Florida
- Education: Degree, 1923
- Occupation: Engineer
- Spouse: Henrietta Rach Hoernle
- Children: 2

Henrietta Rach Hoernle
- Born: September 24, 1912; Karlsruhe, Germany
- Died: July 22, 2016 (aged 103)
- Burial place: Forest Lawn Memorial Gardens North, Pompano Beach, Florida
- Occupation: Philanthropist
- Spouse: Adolfe de Hoernle
- Children: 2

The Count and Countess de Hoernle were a German-born American philanthropic couple who made many major donations to arts, educational, and social agencies, primarily in the Boca Raton, Florida, area. Their names are seen on more than 50 buildings in the area. Their titles are from the Knights of Malta. The Countess said that the importance of the titles was that they made it easier to raise money.

== Adolfe de Hoernle ==
Adolfe de Hoernle (May 10, 1903 — September 10, 1998) was born in Pforzheim, Germany. He earned his degree as an engineer in 1923 and emigrated to the United States in 1926.

De Hoernle created his fortune as creator and owner of the Stewart Stamping Corporation of Yonkers, New York, a metal stamping company (merged in 1999 with Eyelets for Industry to create Stewart EFI). He sold the company and retired in 1965. He suffered a stroke in 1990.

== Henrietta Rach Hoernle ==
Henrietta Rach (September 24, 1912 — July 22, 2016) was born in Karlsruhe, Germany, the daughter of musicians. She emigrated to the United States in 1931.

Rach married Adolfe on October 26, 1950, and they settled in Bronxville, New York, where they raised two daughters. He was her third husband. She was an avid bridge enthusiast.

== Their philanthropy ==
Over the course of three decades, with the Countess taking the more public role as a leader or board member of a host of charity foundations, the Count followed her guidance in donating millions of dollars of his fortune. Recipients in New York included the Hudson River Museum in Yonkers, the Isabella Home for the Aged in New York City, and Lawrence Hospital in Bronxville, where the east wing is named The Hoernle Pavilion.

The largest amounts were focused on projects in Boca Raton, Florida, where they retired permanently in 1989 after nine years of splitting their time between Boca Raton and their home in Bronxville (and 20 world cruises). Organizations benefitting from their generosity include the Boca Raton Museum of Art, the Boca Raton Community Hospital, the Boca Express Train Museum, the Caldwell Theater, the Spanish River Community High School, the YMCA of Boca Raton, the Palm Beach State College, an annual nursing scholarship for migrant workers at Florida Atlantic University, the local Association for Retarded Citizens, and The Haven, a home for neglected children.

The couple financed the construction of Lynn University's Count and Countess de Hoernle Sports and Cultural Center with a $2.5 million donation, and their names are on two other Lynn buildings: Count and Countess de Hoernle Residence Hall and de Hoernle International Center. His funds helped build the Countess de Hoernle Student Life Center on the West Palm Beach campus of Keiser University, and the Count de Hoernle Pavilion in Boca's Mizner Park.

Henrietta bought the then-abandoned Florida East Coast Railway station in Boca Raton, which after their $500,000 donation for renovation became the Boca Express Train Museum, "as a birthday present for her husband", whose name it bears. Also bearing his name is the Dehoernle Alzheimer's Pavilion in Deerfield Beach, Florida, to which he was moved five days before he died. The Countess paid $1,000,000 for the naming rights to the statue of Flossy in Mizner Park, which she named for her friend Florence "Flossy" Keesely.

They are buried in Forest Lawn Memorial Gardens North in Pompano Beach, Florida.

== Honors ==
In 1994, the couple were given a key to the city of Boca by then-Mayor Bill T. Smith. A statue of the couple, created by artist & sculptor Yaacov Heller, is located in Mizner Park. It lists 42 buildings named either after the Count, Countess, or both, and, said the artist, "she continued to donate money after those statues were put up."
