= History of Palm Beach County, Florida =

Palm Beach County is a county in the southeastern part of the U.S. state of Florida. Its history dates back to about 12,000 years ago, shortly after when Native Americans migrated into Florida. Juan Ponce de León became the first European in the area, landing at the Jupiter Inlet in 1513. Diseases from Europe, enslavement, and warfare significantly diminished the indigenous population of Florida over the next few centuries. During the Second Seminole War, the Battles of the Loxahatchee occurred west of modern-day Jupiter in 1838. The Jupiter Lighthouse, the county's oldest surviving structure, was completed in 1860. The first homestead claims were filed around Lake Worth in 1873. The county's first hotel, schoolhouse, and railway, the Celestial Railroad, began operating in the 1880s, while the first settlers of modern-day Lake Worth Beach arrived in 1885. During the 1890s, Henry Flagler and his workers constructed the Royal Poinciana Hotel and The Breakers in Palm Beach and extended the Florida East Coast Railway southward to the area. They also developed a separate city for hotel workers, which in 1894 became West Palm Beach, the county's oldest incorporated municipality. Major Nathan Boynton, Congressman William S. Linton, and railroad surveyor Thomas Rickards also arrived in the 1890s and developed communities that became Boynton Beach, Delray Beach, and Boca Raton, respectively.

The Florida Legislature established Palm Beach County, effective on July 1, 1909, splitting it from Dade County. The dredging of canals from the coast to Lake Okeechobee in the 1910s for the purpose of agricultural shipments led to the beginning of settlements around Lake Okeechobee. From then through the mid-1920s, the county experienced rapid population growth and a significant increase in land values, especially during the land boom. Many of the county's historic buildings and districts were constructed in the 1910s and 1920s; architect Addison Mizner alone designed 104 structures. However, the rapid growth and prosperity ended with the 1928 Okeechobee hurricane and the start of the Great Depression. The hurricane devastated the county and resulted in at least 2,500 deaths. Hundreds of thousands of men and women arrived in Palm Beach County during World War II for training and supporting the war effort, while several coastal towns were placed under blackout conditions due to the presence of German U-boats just offshore.

Many personnel who trained in Palm Beach County during the war later vacationed or relocated to the area. Consequently, a post-war boom ensued, with 19 new municipalities incorporated between 1947 and 1963, while over 100,000 people lived in the county by 1950. During the civil rights movement, schools in the county slowly desegregated despite the Brown v. Board of Education ruling and were not officially integrated until 1973. Rapid population growth occurred in the western suburban communities in the 1980s, though the larger eastern cities experienced urban blight by then. This led to downtown revitalization efforts, most notably with the opening of Mizner Park in 1991 and CityPlace in 2000. The close results of that year's presidential election in Florida and Palm Beach County's "butterfly ballot" led to a recount and controversial decision by the United States Supreme Court. In 2004 and 2005, hurricanes Frances, Jeanne, and Wilma caused significant damage in the county. Although population growth has slowed somewhat in recent decades, the 2020 census reported that nearly 1.5 million people are year-round residents of Palm Beach County.

== History ==
=== Prior to 1860 ===
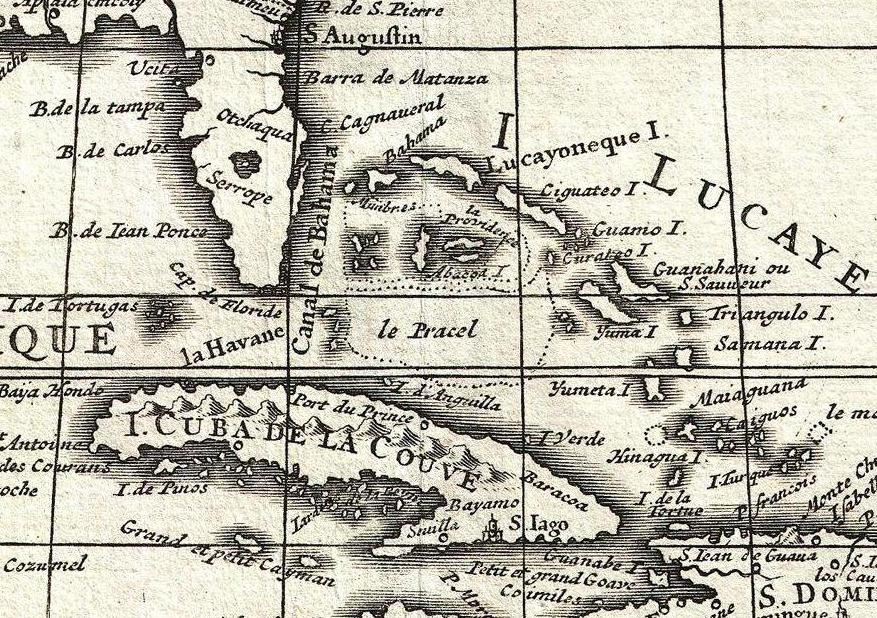
A 1708 map showing Florida, the Bahamas, and much of the Greater Antilles

Approximately 12,000 years ago, Native Americans began migrating into Florida. The earliest tribes that settled in or near modern-day Palm Beach County included the Ais, Calusas, Jaegas, Mayaimis, and Tequestas. University of Florida professor John Mann Goggin in the 1940s and 1950s documented 42 archaeological sites in Martin and Palm Beach counties indicating the presence of indigenous peoples, while Bob Carr of the Archaeological and Historical Conservancy updated Goggin's survey in 2004. Major sites include the Belle Glade mound; Big Gopher and Big Mound City, to the southeast of Canal Point; Boca Raton Inlet Complex; Boynton Cave; Boynton Mound Complex, near the Loxahatchee National Wildlife Refuge; Guest Mound Complex in Palm Beach; Loxahatchee River Complex, near Jupiter; Patrician mound in South Palm Beach; Riverbend Park, which contains evidence of inhabitation dating as far back as the Paleo-Indian period, to the west of Jupiter; Riviera Complex, with one site in Riviera Beach and Palm Beach; and the Spanish River Complex in Boca Raton and Highland Beach.

Although an estimated 20,000 Native Americans lived in South Florida when the Spanish arrived in the 16th century, their population diminished significantly by the 18th century due to warfare, enslavement, and diseases from Europe. In 1513, Juan Ponce de León, who led a European expedition to Florida earlier that year, became the first non-Native American to reach Palm Beach County, after landing in the modern-day Jupiter area. He would name the Jupiter Inlet, "Rio de la Cruz" (River of the Cross). Among the first non-Native American residents were African Americans, many of whom were former slaves or immediate descendants of former slaves who had escaped to Florida from plantations in Alabama and Georgia. They began arriving in what was then Spanish Florida in the late 17th century and found refuge among the Seminoles.

In either 1659 or 1660, the Spanish aviso San Miguel de Archangel wrecked just south of the Jupiter Inlet. The 33 survivors took refuge at the Jeaga village of Hobe, located at present-day DuBois Park, until being rescued. Another maritime incident occurred near the same area in 1696. A storm, likely a hurricane, caused the barkentine Reformation to capsize around the Jupiter Inlet during its voyage from Port Royal, Jamaica, to Philadelphia. The occupants, which included Quaker merchant Jonathan Dickinson and his family, were held captive by the Jobe tribe for several days. After being released and having most of their possession taken, the party had to travel on foot northward until reaching St. Augustine. Dickinson published a journal in 1699 detailing the ordeal and later served in several political offices including mayor of Philadelphia from 1712–1713 and 1717–1719 and speaker of the Pennsylvania Provincial Assembly in 1718 and 1719.

During the Seminole Wars, former slaves fought alongside the Seminoles against white settlers and bounty hunters. Portions of the Second Seminole War occurred in Palm Beach County, including the Battles of the Loxahatchee in January 1838. Intending to follow the Seminoles southward from Fort Jupiter, Major General Thomas Jesup decided that Major William Lauderdale, his Tennessee Volunteers, and "construction pioneers" – which were men from the United States Third Artillery Regiment then led by First lieutenant Robert Anderson, who would later be commander at Fort Sumter at the beginning of the American Civil War – must cut a trail through the dense vegetation to the New River Settlement in modern-day Fort Lauderdale. Major Lauderdale, the 233 Tennessee Volunteers, and the construction pioneers began carving the trail on March 2, 1838, and reached the New River Settlement four days later. Covering a distance of 63 miles (101 kilometres), the trail was originally known as "Lauderdale's Route", but later became known as "Military Trail" due to its usage by the United States Army over the next few decades. Eighty-five years later, in 1923, much of the modern highway of Military Trail would be paved across this path.

In 1841, Seminole Chief Chachi became the first resident of Palm Beach County known by name. His village was located near the present-day site of Interstate 95 and Palm Beach Lakes Boulevard. That same year, soldiers in the United States Army camped by a freshwater lake and named it Lake Worth in honor of Army colonel William J. Worth, who is credited with ending the Second Seminole War.

=== 1860–1889 ===
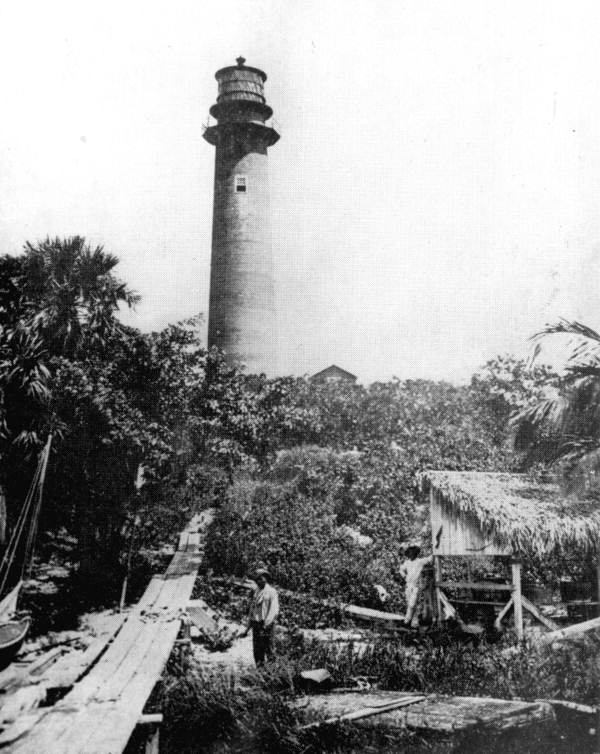
The Jupiter Lighthouse circa 1880

The county's oldest surviving structure, the Jupiter Lighthouse, was completed in 1860, six years after receiving authorization to the land from President Franklin Pierce. During the American Civil War, Florida was a member of the Confederate States of America. To aid the cause of their state, Augustus O. Lang and James Paine removed the lighting mechanism, dimming the lighthouse and assisting their blockade runners. Lang was also the first white settler in Palm Beach County. He built a palmetto shack along the eastern shore of Lake Worth in 1863 after abandoning the cause of the Confederacy. After the Civil War ended, the Jupiter Lighthouse was re-lit in 1866. A National Weather Service office was established at the lighthouse complex in the 1870s. However, the office was moved to Miami in 1911 after that city's population began to rapidly grow.

The 1870 census recorded a population of 85 in Dade County, which then included modern-day Broward, Martin, Miami-Dade, and Palm Beach counties. Hiram F. Hammon filed the first homestead claim on Lake Worth in 1873, not too long before Hannibal Pierce filed the second claim. At the time, fewer than 12 people resided around Lake Worth. In October 1873, a hurricane caused a shipwreck between Biscayne Bay and the New River. The crew survived, but nearly died due to starvation because of the desolation of the area. An act of Congress on June 20, 1874, resulted in the establishment of five Houses of Refuge along the east coast of Florida between the Matanzas Inlet and Biscayne Bay. Orange Grove House of Refuge No. 3 was built near Delray Beach in 1876. The Tustenegee Post Office opened on the east side of Lake Worth in 1877, becoming the area's first post office. In January 1878, the Providencia capsized offshore Palm Beach with a cargo of approximately 20,000 coconuts. These coconuts were then planted. The incident is credited with being the namesake of Palm Beach County and the town of Palm Beach.

By 1880, the population of Dade County reached 257. In the same year, the first hotel around Lake Worth opened after Elisha N. "Cap" Dimick converted his home into the Cocoanut Grove House. Five years later, in 1885, the Barefoot mailman route began serving the area. Carriers would deliver mail by foot or boat from Palm Beach and other nearby communities to as far south as Miami, a round trip distance of 136 mi (219 km). Also in 1885, Fannie and Samuel James, both African-American, became the first settlers at the future site of the city of Lake Worth, though this area would originally be called Jewell after the post office founded there in 1889. The first schoolhouse in southeast Florida (also known as the Little Red Schoolhouse) opened in 1886 in Palm Beach near where the Flagler Memorial Bridge stands today.

Residents living along Lake Worth, then known as Lake Worth Country, began expressing dissatisfaction in treatment from Dade County in 1888. With the county seat then at Miami (at the time known as Bay Country), Lake Worth Country residents petitioned for a special election to relocate the county seat, as they had a larger population than Bay Country. The seat of Dade County would be switched to Juno (just south of modern-day Juno Beach) in February 1889. Although some Bay Country residents accepted the outcome of the election, many others did not, instead promising to "be well armed and ready to take care of the situation." on the morning after learning the results. Consequently, the Lake Worth Country delegation sent to collect the county records decided to escape Bay Country by canoeing through the Everglades at night up to the New River. After resting at the New River House of Refuge, the delegation resumed their journey to Juno without any further confrontation. Also in 1889, the Jupiter and Lake Worth Railway, more often referred to as the Celestial Railroad, began operating in July. The train transported riders from Jupiter to Juno, a distance of about 7.5 mi (12.1 km).

=== 1890–1899 ===
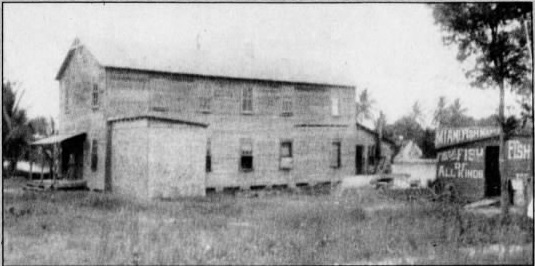
The Dade County Courthouse at Juno, completed in the summer of 1890

Dade County reported a population of 995 people in the 1890 census. The Dade County Courthouse at Juno opened in the summer of 1890 after public records had been stored at a private home since the previous year. The building was two-story and contained offices for the county clerk, judge, and sheriff on the ground floor and the courtroom on the second floor. In 1891, The Tropical Sun moved from Titusville to Juno, becoming the area's first newspaper. Henry Flagler, an instrumental figure in the county's development in the late 19th century and early 20th century, first visited in 1893, describing the area as a "veritable paradise." Flagler subsequently purchased land on both sides of Lake Worth. Other investors followed suit, causing a small boom and bringing in existing businesses or new ones were established. Flagler developed a community on the lake's west shore to house the workers of the hotels to be built in Palm Beach. This community would soon become West Palm Beach. The year 1893 also saw the establishment of the area's oldest business and the first bank, the Lainhart and Potter Lumber Company in West Palm Beach and the Dade County State Bank in Palm Beach, respectively.

On Lake Worth's eastern shore, the Royal Poinciana Hotel in Palm Beach opened for business in February 1894, constructed by Flagler to accommodate wealthy tourists. About a month later, the Florida East Coast Railway, owned by Flagler, reached West Palm Beach. The Flagler Alerts began operating in 1894 in West Palm Beach as the area's first volunteer fire department. Additionally, the first school for African-American students was founded in West Palm Beach in 1894. In the same year, West Palm Beach incorporated as a town on November 5 and became the first municipality in Palm Beach County. Major Nathan Boynton, congressman William S. Linton, and David Swinton, all from Michigan, arrived in the area in 1894 and established communities that would eventually become Boynton Beach and Linton (later renamed Delray Beach). The Florida East Coast Railway reached Boca Raton in 1895, the same year that railroad agent and surveyor Thomas Rickards became the first white settler in Boca Raton. Another significant event in 1895 was the completion of the first railroad across Lake Worth, linking Palm Beach and West Palm Beach to allow guests at Flagler's hotels direct access.

In the following year, 1896, devastation from two large fires in downtown West Palm Beach resulted in building codes being updated to require brick structures. Flagler opened another hotel in Palm Beach that year, which was originally known as the Palm Beach Inn but later renamed The Breakers after guests began requesting rooms "by the breakers". The Breakers was the county's first beachfront hotel. Flagler would also build his own winter home, known as Whitehall, which he and his wife moved into in 1902. South Florida's oldest actively circulating newspaper, the Palm Beach Daily News (also known as the "Shiny Sheet"), began publication in 1897 under the name Daily Lake Worth News. Edward R. Bradley's Beach Club opened in Palm Beach in 1898, becoming the county's first gambling establishment. Despite the efforts to relocate the county seat to Juno in 1889, the Dade County seat reverted to Miami in 1899 after the population of the Bay Country grew larger.

=== 1900–1909 ===
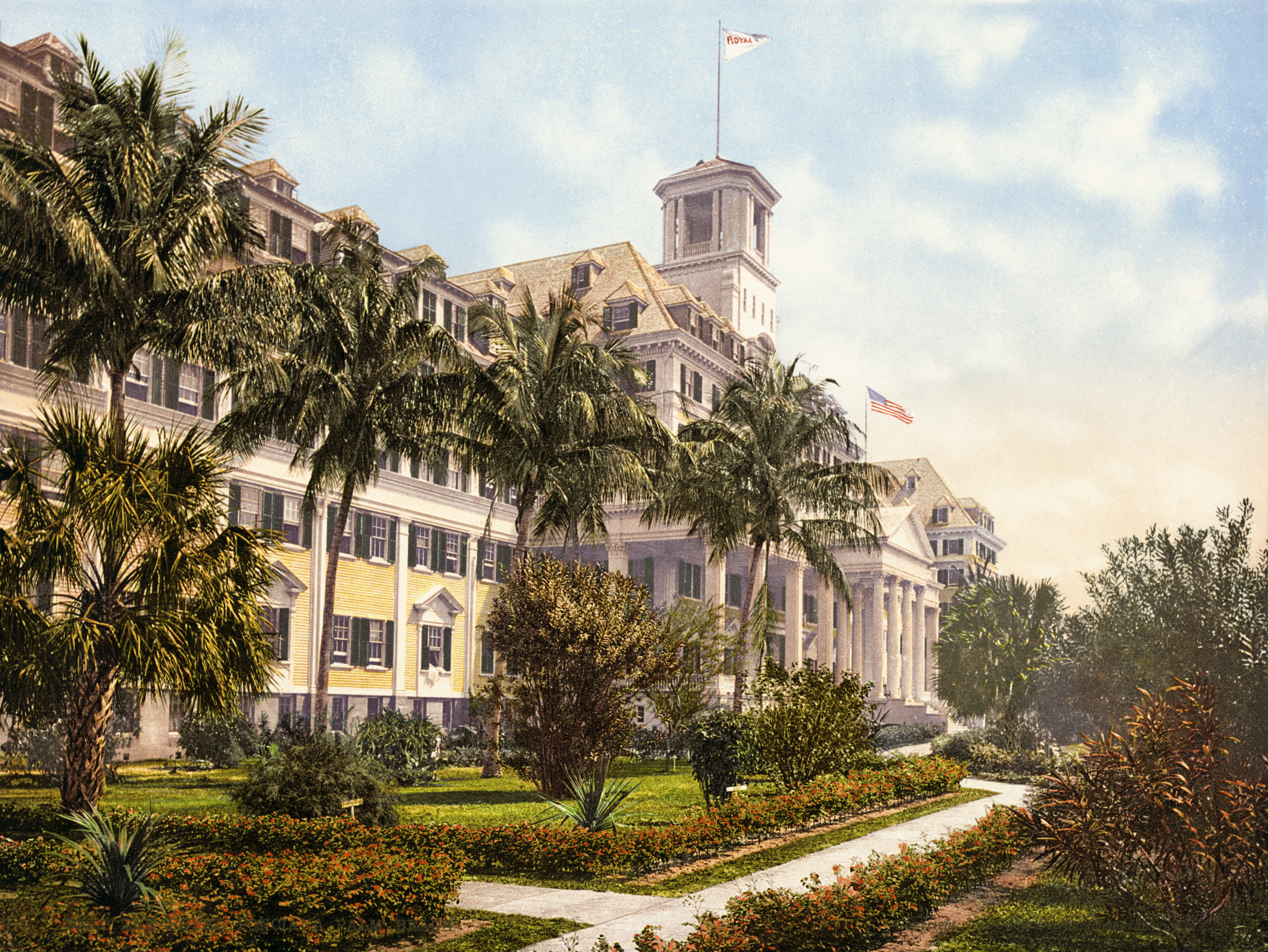
The Royal Poinciana Hotel in 1900

Around 1900, West Palm Beach had electrical and telephone service, a library, a sewer system, a pumping station, and paved roads. The census recorded a population of 564 in West Palm Beach. The Breakers Hotel burned down on June 9, 1903. After realizing the futility in attempting to save the building, firefighting crews instead worked on preventing fire from spreading. The hotel would be rebuilt and reopened in 1904 about eight months after the fire. A hurricane struck near Fort Lauderdale on September 11, 1903, likely at Category 1 intensity on the modern-day Saffir–Simpson scale. The storm caused extensive damage in Palm Beach County, destroying many buildings and crops. Damage reached "way up in the thousands" in West Palm Beach according to The Tropical Sun, while The Miami Metropolis noted "almost indescribable" impact and the ground being "literally covered" with fruit in Boynton Beach. Nine people drowned after the British steamship Inchulva capsized offshore Delray Beach.

In 1904, Joseph Sakai founded the Yamato Colony, intending for it to become a community of Japanese farmers in present-day Boca Raton. The farmers most prominently grew pineapples, but also citrus and vegetables. Many of the Japanese settlers abandoned the community by the onset of World War II. George Morikami would remain in the area and accumulate over 200 acres (81 ha) of land in Delray Beach. He donated a portion of the land to the county government in 1973, which opened the Morikami Museum and Japanese Gardens a few years later in his honor.

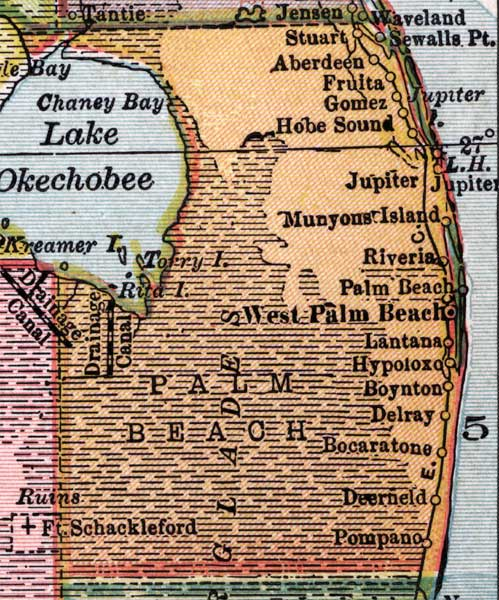
A 1910 map of Palm Beach County, showing its original 1909 boundaries

An attempt to establish Palm Beach County in 1907 failed. Much of the resources and tax dollars went toward improving southern Dade County (modern-day Miami-Dade County), while development in the north end of the county was generally dependent on Henry Flagler even though the area from Fort Lauderdale to Stuart comprised about 60 percent of the tax base. As a result, a committee of eight people presented a petition to the Florida legislature for partitioning the county, while another four people lobbied in Tallahassee for the establishment of a new county. Although the state senate approved the measure, it would be soundly defeated in the state house of representatives. Two years later, state representative George O. Butler of Miami was recruited to lead another attempt. The petition effort then succeeded on April 30, 1909, and Palm Beach County became Florida's 47th county on July 1 of that year.

Upon Palm Beach County's creation in 1909, West Palm Beach would be designated as the county seat. The county was carved out of what was then the northern portion of Dade County and comprised parts of present-day Broward, Martin, and Okeechobee counties, while also including the entirely of Lake Okeechobee. A public schoolhouse at the intersection of Clematis Street and Poinsettia Street (Dixie Highway) would be used for county business until a courthouse was built. The first county commissioners included chairman W. H. DaCamara and members E. F. Bowers, H. J. Niblack, C. W. McPherson, and R. H. Rousseau. Other county officials included circuit court clerk Fred E. Fenno, county judge T. M. Rickards Jr., school superintendent J. C. Harris, sheriff George B. Baker, supervisor of registration J. L. Grier, tax assessor James M. Owens Sr., and tax collector H. E. Stypmann.

The Bijou, the area's first theater, opened in West Palm Beach in 1908. Palm Beach County, a newspaper which later became The Palm Beach Post, began publishing and circulating weekly editions in 1909. The 1900s decade also marked the beginning of extensive land usage in the Lake Okeechobee region. The Everglades Drainage District, formed by the Florida state government in 1907, sold large tracts of land in western Palm Beach County between 1908 and 1910. Settlers arrived in this section of the county around this time, with Canal Point and Ritta Island being settled by 1909, although Kreamer Island had been a fishing and agricultural outpost since the late 1800s.

=== 1910–1919 ===
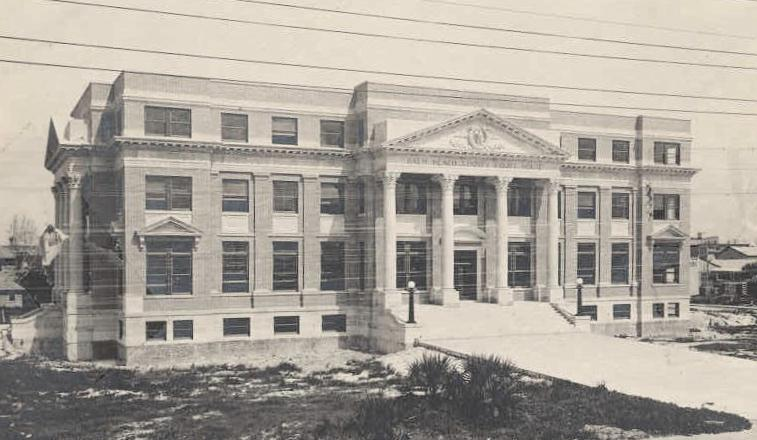
The 1916 Palm Beach County Courthouse

The first census of Palm Beach County in 1910 tallied a population of 5,577. On April 17, 1911, the town of Palm Beach was incorporated as the county's second municipality, a few months after it became known that West Palm Beach planned to annex the community. Prior to the 1910s, many African-Americans employees at Flagler's hotels resided in a section of Palm Beach known as the "Styx". However, they would be evicted between 1910 and 1912, with most of them relocating to the northern West Palm Beach neighborhoods of Freshwater, Northwest, and Pleasant City. James McCurdy conducted the first flight over Palm Beach County in 1911 after flying above Palm Beach and West Palm Beach. On October 9 of that year, Delray Beach was incorporated as a town, becoming Palm Beach County's third municipality. Two years later, in 1913, Lake Worth was established as a town by charter, which originally banned African-Americans from living there.

Emergency Hospital, the first hospital in the area, opened in 1914. Two years later, the Pine Ridge Hospital opened and it remained the only hospital in the area to serve blacks until the end of segregation in the 1960s. In 1915, the southern portion of Palm Beach County and the northern portion of Dade County were partitioned to create Broward County. Another change to the county's boundaries occurred two years later, when the northwest corner of Palm Beach County became part of Okeechobee County. Construction began on a new courthouse in West Palm Beach at 3rd Street and Poinsettia Street (Dixie Highway) in 1916, which opened during the following year. The completion of the West Palm Beach Canal also occurred in 1917. With the western terminus at Lake Okeechobee at Canal Point, the canal allowed for crops to be shipped directly into West Palm Beach and then along the Florida East Coast Railway. Consequently, the canal spurred population growth at Canal Point and Pahokee, and caused settlement at Loxahatchee Groves (though incorporation did not occur until 2006), whose founders envisioned a "waterfront" farming community in the central interior of Palm Beach County. The completion of two other canals during the decade led to settlement at South Bay in 1912 and Belle Glade in 1918, along with many other smaller communities near Lake Okeechobee. Industrial Junior and Senior High School opened in West Palm Beach in 1917 as Palm Beach County's first high school for African-American students. The late 1910s also marked the beginning of Addison Mizner's influence on South Florida architecture, with the Everglades Club opening in Palm Beach in 1919.

=== 1920–1929 ===
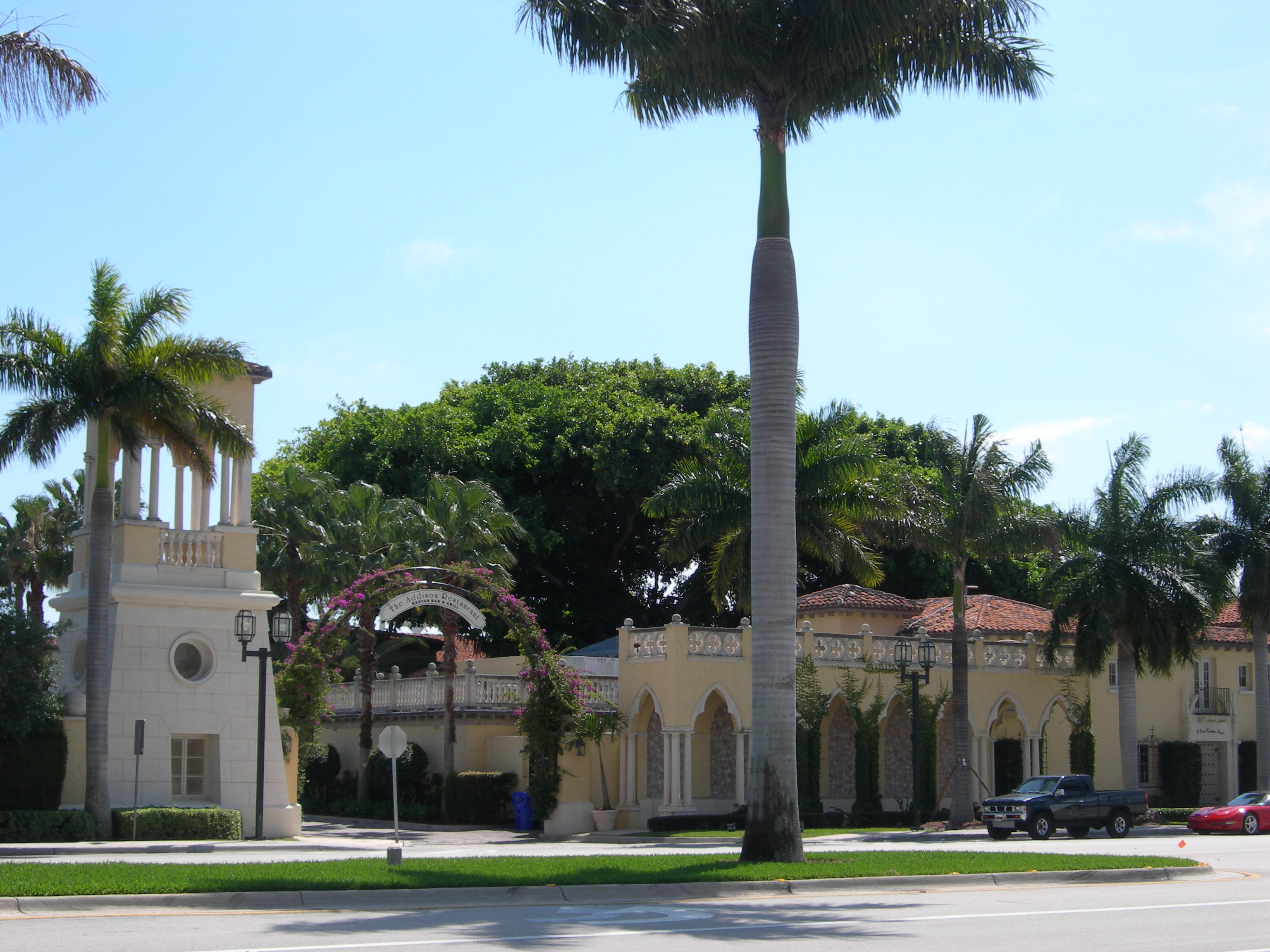
The Administration Buildings, a historic site designed by Addison Mizner in Boca Raton in the 1920s

Palm Beach County benefited significantly from the land boom of the 1920s and also experienced a massive growth in population during the decade. In the county seat of West Palm Beach, the total property value skyrocketed from $13.6 million in 1920 to $61 million in 1925 and then reached a pre-Great Depression peak of $89 million in 1929. The 1920 census recorded a population of 18,654 people in the county, which increased to 51,781 people by the 1930 census, while the population of West Palm Beach quadrupled between 1920 and 1927. Many local historic districts and landmarks were designed and constructed during the 1920s, with notable architects such as the firm Harvey and Clarke (which included Gustav Maass, notable in his own right), Maurice Fatio, Mizner, and Marion Sims Wyeth. Several municipalities incorporated, including Boynton Beach in 1920; Lantana in 1921; Pahokee and Riviera Beach in 1922; Kelsey City (which became Lake Park in 1939) in 1923; Jupiter, Boca Raton, and Gulf Stream in 1925; Greenacres in 1926; Belle Glade in 1928; and Plumosus City in 1929, which was later absorbed by the town of Jupiter in 1959. The county boundaries also contracted further in the 1920s after Martin County was established in 1925.

Mizner, who began designing structures in the late 1910s, continued to do so in the 1920s. Before moving to Boca Raton in 1925, he had designed 67 buildings in Palm Beach, including Via Mizner, which became the first shopping complex along the then-mostly residential Worth Avenue, now a notorious upscale shopping district. In Boca Raton, Mizner intended to create "the world's most architecturally beautiful playground.", designing 27 structures in the town. His company, the Mizner Development Corporation, briefly operated the WFLA radio station in Boca Raton, but it folded within one year after the company declared bankruptcy. Throughout Palm Beach County, he designed 104 structures, with several later being listed on the National Register of Historic Places.

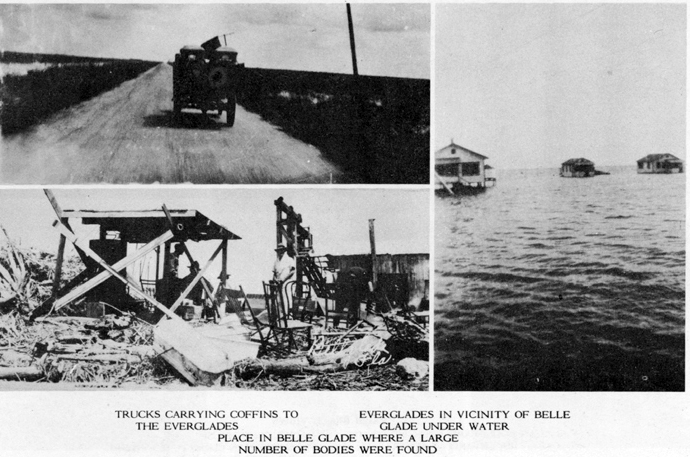
A montage of images of impact by the Okeechobee hurricane

Conners Highway opened in 1924, linking West Palm Beach to the Lake Okeechobee region and forming a portion of the first cross-state roadway. On March 18, 1925, a massive fire broke out in Palm Beach at the Breakers Hotel and soon spread to the old Palm Beach Hotel. The West Palm Beach Fire Department responded to the fire and summoned assistance from other departments as far away as Miami to respond. Their efforts to contain the blaze were futile, though both hotels would reopen in 1926. In 1927, William A. Boutwell began operating a dairy farm in Lake Worth and an area now part of Palm Springs. Boutwell would later be credited as the inventor of half-and-half creamer.

Early on September 17, 1928, (Note: In local time, Eastern Standard Time (EST), the hurricane made landfall in Florida around 8:00 p.m. on September 16. However, government meteorological agencies such as NOAA use Coordinated Universal Time (UTC), which is five hours ahead of EST.) the Okeechobee hurricane made landfall near West Palm Beach with sustained winds of 145 mph (233 km/h) and crossed Lake Okeechobee shortly thereafter. Strong winds and storm surge devastated much of the coast, especially Lake Worth, Palm Beach, and West Palm Beach, while a total of 26 deaths occurred. In West Palm Beach alone, the hurricane destroyed 1,711 homes, damaged 6,369 homes, destroyed 268 businesses, and damaged 490 businesses. Farther inland, wind-driven storm surge in Lake Okeechobee inundated adjacent communities, particularly Belle Glade, Pahokee, and South Bay. Hundreds of square miles were flooded, including some areas with up to 20 ft (6.1 m) of water. Numerous houses were swept away and damaged after crashing into other obstacles. A survey of impact throughout the county reported 552 businesses destroyed, 1,447 businesses damaged, 3,584 homes destroyed, and 11,409 homes damaged, leaving 4,008 families homeless. However, these figures do not include cities such as Boca Raton, Greenacres, Lantana, and South Palm Beach. Governor John W. Martin estimated that 15,000 families were left homeless in Palm Beach County. Damage in South Florida totaled approximately $25 million (1928 USD).

In addition to the significant damage, the 1928 hurricane also caused at least 2,500 deaths, with many of the victims being black migrant farmers. A total of 742 bodies were transported from the Lake Okeechobee region to West Palm Beach for burial. However, due to segregation laws, the white victims were buried at Woodlawn Cemetery, while the deceased who were either black or of unidentifiable race, totaling 674 out of the 742 bodies, were interred at a pauper's cemetery. The site at which the black victims or those of an unknown race were buried remained unmarked until 2003, the 75th anniversary of the disaster. Previously, Lake Okeechobee overflowed in 1926 during the Miami hurricane, though flooding primarily occurred in Moore Haven in Glades County. As a result of both the 1926 and 1928 hurricanes, Palm Beach County and the rest of South Florida began suffering economic turmoil, pushing the region into the Great Depression, even before the Wall Street Crash of 1929. Housing prices dropped dramatically in the county, as well as in the rest of the country, while the Palm Beach Bank and Trust closed on June 29, 1929.

=== 1930–1939 ===
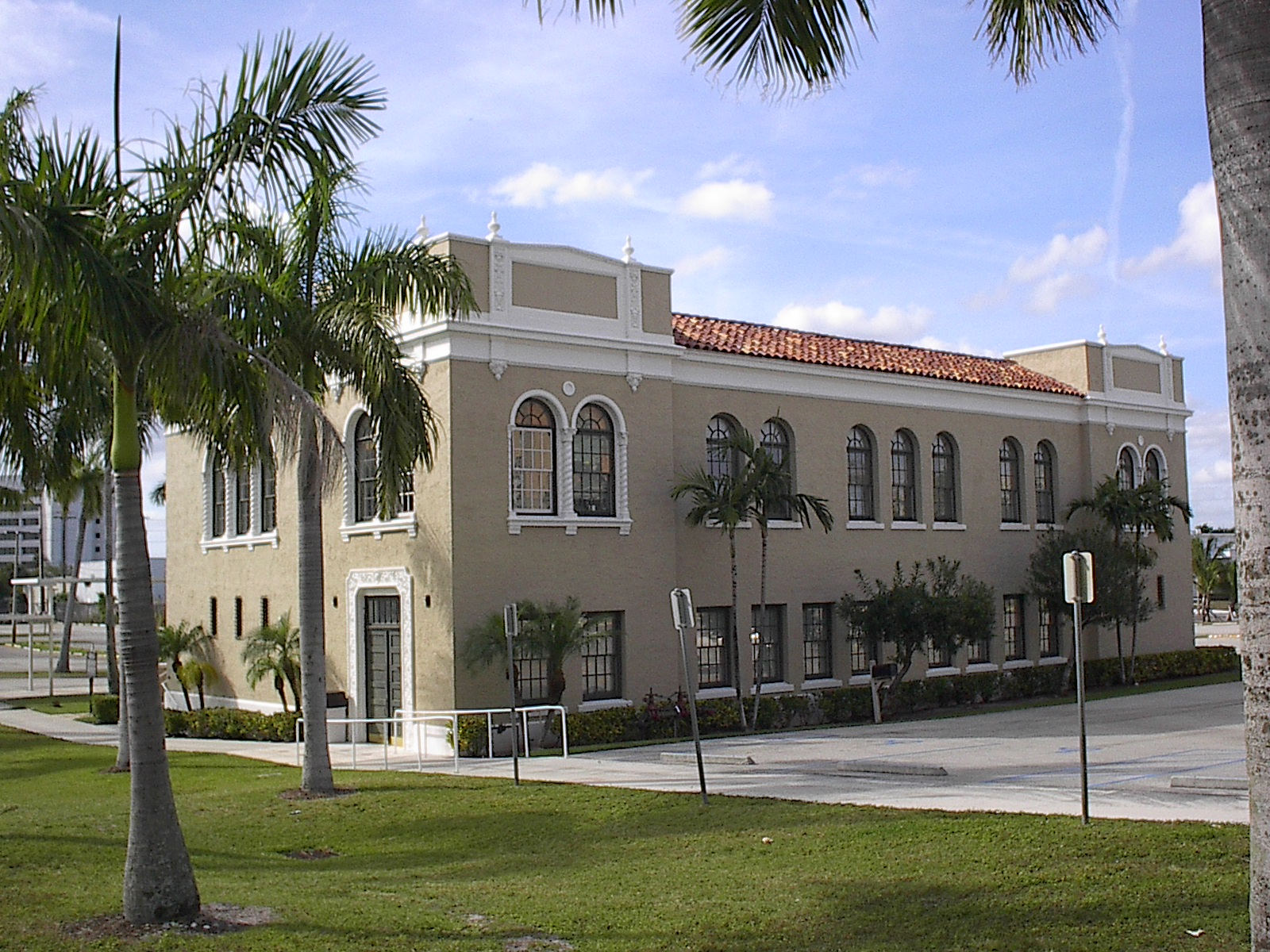
The building housing Palm Beach Junior College between 1933 and 1948

In 1930, the population of Palm Beach County reached 51,781. The worsening impacts of the Great Depression resulted in the closure of 12 banks by 1930, while the total real estate value in West Palm Beach fell from $41.3 million in 1930 to $18.2 million in 1935. In spite of the economic crisis, population growth and the development of homes and infrastructure continued, albeit at a much slower pace. Also in 1930, President Herbert Hoover signed into law the Rivers and Harbors Act, authorizing the construction of a dike at Lake Okeechobee in an effort to mitigate a disaster similar to the hurricanes in 1926 and 1928. The dike would be completed in 1961 and named after Hoover. In 1931, the neighboring coastal towns of Manalapan and Ocean Ridge were incorporated.

The School District of Palm Beach County saw the need for an educational institution to assist local high school graduates with finding work during the economic turmoil of the Great Depression. As such, county school superintendent Joe Youngblood and Palm Beach High School principal Howell Watkins founded Palm Beach Junior College (PBJC) in 1933, Florida's first junior college. Watkins became the first dean of the PBJC. Originally located on the campus of Palm Beach High School (now Dreyfoos School of the Arts), PBJC moved out of its original building in 1948 and eventually to its main campus in Lake Worth in 1956. The college would be renamed twice to reflect the expansion of educational programs, becoming Palm Beach Community College in 1988 and then being renamed Palm Beach State College (PBSC) in 2010. PBSC expanded to five campuses – Belle Glade in 1972, Palm Beach Gardens in 1980, Boca Raton in 1983, and Loxahatchee Groves in 2017.

By the 1930s, Grace Morrison advocated for the construction of an airport in the county after she learned to fly an aircraft. The Palm Beach International Airport (PBI), then known as Morrison's Field, opened in 1936, built at a cost of $180,000. The airport was originally named in memory of her, as she died in a car accident a few months before it opened. The town of Golfview, located just west of the airport, would be incorporated in 1937. However, the expansion of PBI in the 1980s caused residents to begin abandoning Golfview, which was officially dissolved in 1998. Golfview's entranceway, erected in 1934, was moved to Yesteryear Village at the South Florida Fairgrounds.

=== 1940–1949 ===
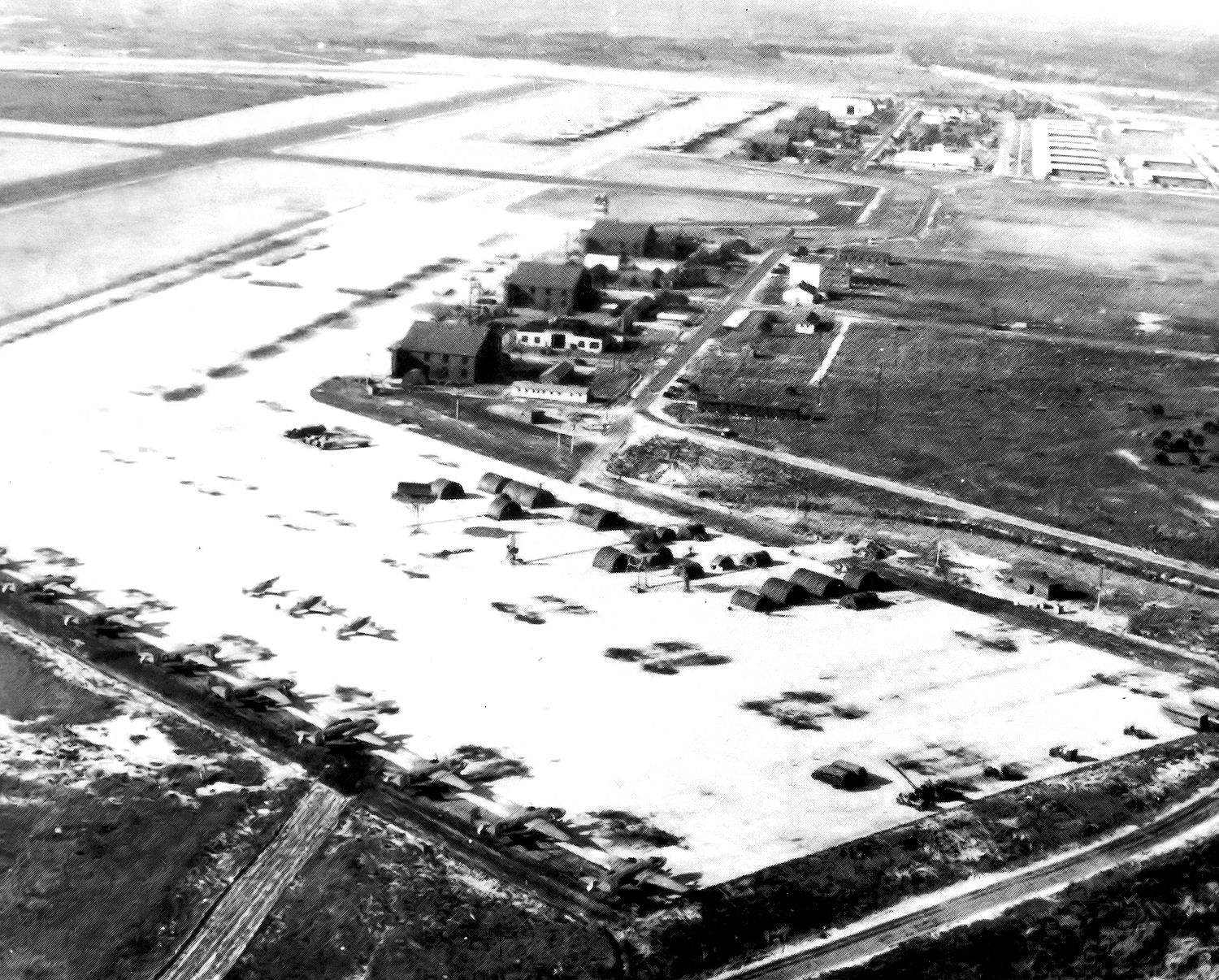
Boca Raton Army Air Field in 1944

The population of Palm Beach County reached 79,989 during the 1940 census. One year later, South Bay became an incorporated municipality. During World War II, thousands of servicemen arrived in Palm Beach County for training and supporting the war effort. Due to the presence of German U-boats just offshore Palm Beach County, coastal towns were placed under blackout orders. In West Palm Beach, an Air Transport Command opened at Morrison Field in 1942, Over 45,000 pilots trained at or transited to other locations across the world via Morrison Field, including for the Normandy landings in France. After the conclusion of the war, the command post was deactivated in 1947, while Morrison Field was renamed Palm Beach International Airport. Moreover, the federal government constructed Palm Beach County Park Airport in Lantana to serve as an overflow facility for Morrison Field.

Over in Palm Beach, The Breakers was converted to a U.S. Army hospital during World War II, while the Biltmore Hotel became a U.S. Navy hospital and a school for training SPARS. Furthermore, a U.S. ranger camp that could accommodate up to 200 people was established at the north end of the island. Boca Raton Army Air Field, located on the present-day site of the Boca Raton Airport and Florida Atlantic University (FAU), opened in October 1942. Compromising more than 800 buildings and 4 runways, the airfield at its peak accommodated more than 100,000 personnel trained there or flew to destinations in Europe or the Pacific Ocean, dwarfing Boca Raton's population of 723 in the 1940 census. Near the Jupiter Lighthouse, the U.S. Military opened the Communications Radio Intelligence Unit and Radio Direction Finding Station, also known as "Station J", which used radio frequencies to detect U-boats. Additionally, a prisoner-of-war (POW) camp operated near Belle Glade, interring up to 250 German POWs during the war.

Following the conclusion of World War II, a number of veterans returned to the area for work, vacation, or retirement, a trend that continued into the 21st century. Consequently, the latter half of the 1940s saw the incorporation of five new municipalities – Glen Ridge, Mangonia Park, and Palm Beach Shores in 1947; and Cloud Lake and Highland Beach in 1949. Unusually heavy rainfall and a series of tropical cyclones in 1947, culminating with the Cape Sable hurricane, led to a major flood disaster in South Florida. Approximately 90 percent of eastern Florida south of Orlando was flooded, while about 7,812.5 sq mi (20,234 km^{2}) of land was inundated with water ranging from at least 6 in (150 mm) to up to 10 ft (3.0 m) above ground. The floods of 1947 resulted in the establishment of the South Florida Water Management District. Another significant tropical cyclone of the 1940s, a Category 4 hurricane, struck Lake Worth Beach on August 28, 1949, with maximum sustained winds of 130 mph (210 km/h). A sustained wind speed of 127 mph (204 km/h) was observed at the Lake Worth Inlet and 153 mph (246 km/h) at the Jupiter Inlet lighthouse (although at a height of 33 ft (10 m) above ground), before the instrument failed. Overall, the hurricane left considerable impact in the county, including the destruction of 65 homes; 13,283 homes suffered some degree of damage. However, the Herbert Hoover Dike and other flood control systems decreased the amount of potential damage in communities surrounding Lake Okeechobee.

=== 1950–1959 ===
The expansion that began in the 1940s accelerated in the 1950s. More than 100,000 people resided in Palm Beach County by the 1950 census, which recorded a population of 114,688. In terms of population increase, the West Palm Beach area in the 1950s was among the most rapidly-growing metropolitan areas in the United States. Fourteen new municipalities were incorporated in the 1950s – Haverhill in 1950; Juno Beach in 1953; Hypoluxo and South Palm Beach in 1955; Lake Clarke Shores and North Palm Beach in 1956; Golf, Palm Springs, and Tequesta in 1957; and Atlantis, Jupiter Inlet Colony, Palm Beach Gardens, Royal Palm Beach, and University Park (later annexed by Boca Raton in 1971) in 1959. Many of these communities are located inland, which heralded a westward expansion. West Palm Beach would also extend its boundaries southward towards Lake Clarke Shores and westward markedly, beyond Military Trail, after Lou Perini and a team of engineers transformed thousands of acres of wetlands into land suitable for commercial and residential development.

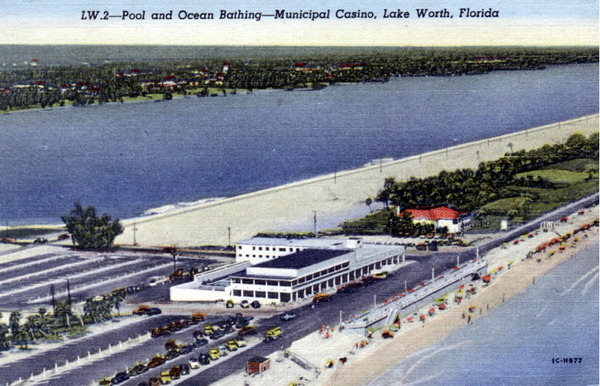
A postcard of the Lake Worth casino and municipal beach (c. 1953)

In 1951, the Loxahatchee National Wildlife Refuge opened, which would later become the Arthur R. Marshall Loxahatchee National Wildlife Refuge in memory of conservationist Arthur R. Marshall. As a result of the Korean War, PBI became the Palm Beach Air Force Base in 1951. The base was closed and became a commercial airport again in 1962. During that time, nearly 23,000 military personnel underwent training at that base. Air Force Beach, now known as John D. MacArthur Beach State Park, also opened in 1951. This section of the beach had to be racially integrated due to President Harry Truman's executive order to integrate the military.

The Africa U.S.A. theme park opened in Boca Raton on March 10, 1953. The attraction included free-roaming animals across the 175 acres (71 ha) park. Owners John P. and Lillian Pedersen added more than 55,000 plants for beautification of the landscape and constructed miles of canals and lakes and artificial features such as geysers and waterfalls. Approximately 300,000 people annually visited the park, which Life' magazine featured on its front cover in August 1960. However, complaints about increased noise and traffic, as well as a bug infestation, resulted in the park closing in 1961. Also in 1953, the area's first television station, WIRK-TV Channel 21, signed on September 13, though it went off the air less than three years later. However, NBC affiliate WPTV-TV and CBS affiliate WPEC first aired in 1954 and 1955, respectively – both of which are still in existence today.

Despite the Brown v. Board of Education decision in 1954, schools in Palm Beach County remained segregated for almost two decades thereafter. After black attorney Bill Holland Sr. unsuccessfully attempted to enroll his son at the exclusively-white Northboro Elementary School in West Palm Beach, he and fellow attorney I. C. Smith filed a class-action suit. Other than token integration in the 1960s, schools would not be officially desegregated until 1973. Circuit judge Curtis Chillingworth and his wife were abducted and presumably murdered by being tossed into the Atlantic Ocean in June 1955. West Palm Beach municipal judge Joseph Peel Jr. and hitmen George "Bobby" Lincoln and Floyd "Lucky" Holzapfel were all convicted six years later on charges stemming from the murders. In 1957, Florida's Turnpike (then known as the Sunshine State Parkway) opened. Roosevelt Junior College for African American students was established in West Palm Beach in 1958. The South Florida Fair began operating at its current location in 1958, the former site of Palm Beach Speedway. The county's first shopping mall opened in 1959. Located near the south end of West Palm Beach, Palm Coast Plaza was "the largest and most complete shopping center between Miami and Jacksonville.", according to South Florida Fair and Exposition manager Lamar Allen.

=== 1960–1969 ===
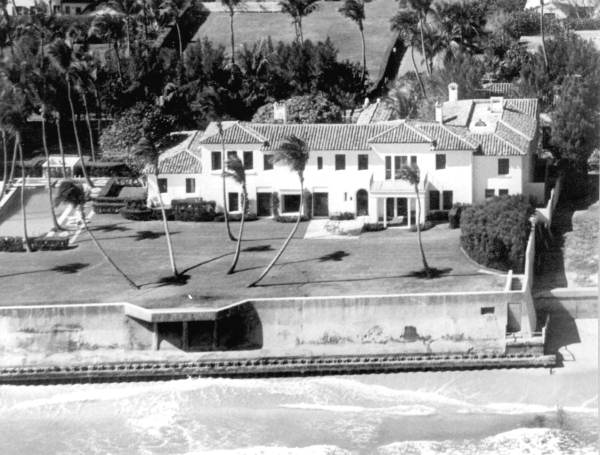
La Querida (circa 1965), an estate in Palm Beach which served as President John F. Kennedy's Winter White House

In 1960, the census recorded a population of 228,106 in Palm Beach County. In the same year, John F. Kennedy won his campaign for the office of president of the United States. Kennedy used La Querida – an estate in Palm Beach originally owned by Rodman Wanamaker and sold to Joseph P. Kennedy Sr. in 1933 – as a Winter White House during his presidency. In December 1960, Richard Paul Pavlick nearly attempted to assassinate then President-elect Kennedy while the family vacationed in Palm Beach. A resident of New Hampshire, Pavlick loaded-up his car with sticks of dynamite and drove down to Palm Beach. He intended to carry-out the assassination attempt at La Querida on December 11 as Kennedy prepared for mass. However, Pavlick forwent his attempt to assassinate Kennedy because Jacqueline and their two children accompanied Kennedy. Four days later, on December 15, police arrested Pavlick after surrounding his car, which had sticks of dynamite inside. The most serious charges were dropped in December 1963 after federal judge Emett Clay Choate declared him legally insane. Additionally, a secret blast shelter was built on Peanut Island during Kennedy's presidency because of escalating Cold War tensions.

The School District of Palm Beach County began integrating schools on a limited basis in 1961. A court ruling resulted in four African American students being accepted into formerly exclusively white schools. Lake Worth Community High School became the first public school to admit black students. In the same year, PBJC began integrating, while the all-black Roosevelt Junior College merged with PBJC in 1965. Attorney Bill Holland Sr., a black attorney who unsuccessfully attempted to enroll his son to a white school in 1956, was permitted to enroll his son at Palm Beach Junior High School (a formerly all-white school) in 1963. Although a personal victory, Holland continued to engage in legal battles in the court system to enforce integration at schools countywide. Progress on desegregation remained slow, with just 137 black students attending formerly whites-only schools in Palm Beach County in 1965 and only Jupiter Community High School being completely desegregated by 1967.

Lynn University in Boca Raton originally opened in 1962 as Marymount College, a two-year college for women. Two years later, another institution of higher learning opened nearby: FAU. The opening of FAU was delayed by six days to September 14, 1964, due to Hurricane Cleo. President Lyndon B. Johnson, who participated in the dedication ceremony, and Florida governor C. Farris Bryant, instrumental in acquiring funds for the university, would both be the first recipients of honorary doctorates from FAU. A third higher learning institute was established during the decade, Palm Beach Atlantic University (PBA). The accredited private Christian university began at a church in downtown West Palm Beach in 1968, before opening a campus in the 1980s.

Another change to Palm Beach County's boundaries occurred in 1963, when the Florida Legislature reduced the county's share of Lake Okeechobee from about 80 percent to less than 40 percent – by 324 sq mi (840 km^{2}) – divided the lake more equitably among Glades, Hendry, Martin, and Okeechobee counties. Also in 1963, the town of Briny Breezes was incorporated. On the land that Lou Perini and the engineers drained and filled in the 1950s, the West Palm Beach Municipal Stadium was built there in 1963, followed by the West Palm Beach Auditorium in 1965 and the Palm Beach Mall in 1967. West Palm Beach mayor Reid Moore Jr., Miss USA 1967 runner-up Cheryl Patton, and Florida governor Claude R. Kirk Jr. were involved in the opening ceremonies for the Palm Beach Mall. The first section of Interstate 95 in Palm Beach County opened in this vicinity in 1966, from Okeechobee Boulevard to 45th Street, a distance of 3.6 mi (5.8 km).

=== 1970–1979 ===
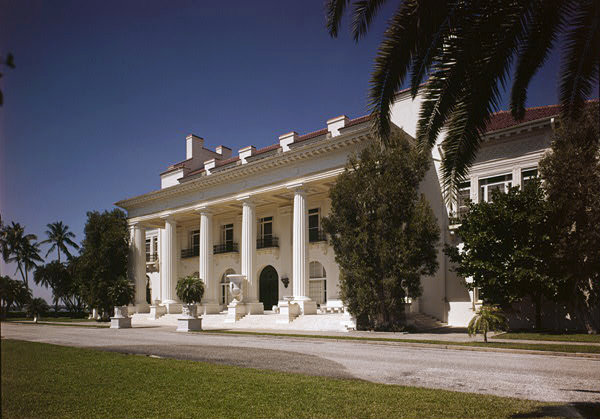
The Bingham-Blossom House and Whitehall (pictured in 1972) became the first National Register of Historic Places listings in the county that year

According to the 1970 census, 348,993 people resided in Palm Beach County at the time. Also in 1970, Daniel Hendrix became the first African American to be elected to the Palm Beach County School Board. In 1972, the Bingham-Blossom House and Whitehall, both located in Palm Beach, became the first two structures in Palm Beach County to be listed in the National Register of Historic Places. However, the former was demolished two years later following a fire that severely damaged the home. Per a final ruling by a U.S. District Court judge on July 9, 1973, in regards to the case brought to the courts by attorney Bill Holland Sr., the Palm Beach County School District officially integrated.

A dedication ceremony for Okeeheelee Park was held on June 15, 1974, and attended by Florida commissioner of agriculture Doyle Conner, Palm Beach County Parks and Recreation director John Dance, Florida Comptroller Fred Otis Dickinson, former Secretary of State of Florida Richard Stone, Florida Commissioner of Education Ralph Turlington, and county commissioners Robert Johnson, Lake Lytal, and George Warren. However, the first phase of the park would not be finished until 1982 and the park was not completed in its entirety until 1996. In 1976, highway engineers completed Interstate 95 from Miami to Palm Beach Gardens.

Palm Beach County experienced a rare snowfall incident on January 19, 1977, as part of a cold wave event. Belle Glade and PBI recorded temperatures as low as 24 and 27 °F (−4 and −3 °C), respectively. The cold snap caused severe damage to crops throughout the state. The cold weather also resulted in power outages and the closure of all of the county's public schools and adult education centers. In 1978, Alexander W. Dreyfoos Jr. founded the Palm Beach County Council of the Arts, which later became the Cultural Council for Palm Beach County. The organization is the official county government agency to support and promote local arts and culture. Another notable weather event in the 1970s, Hurricane David, struck north of West Palm Beach on September 3, 1979, with sustained winds of 100 mph (160 km/h). PBI observed sustained wind speeds of 58 mph (93 km/h), while Jupiter recorded a wind gust of 92 mph (148 km/h). However, winds caused generally minor property damage, which included blowing away the Palm Beach Jai Alai fronton's frame, downing the 186-foot (57 m) WJNO AM radio tower in West Palm Beach into the Intracoastal Waterway, and shattering windows at some stores. Along the coast, rough seas washed away from docks and piers. Damage in the county reached $30 million (1979 USD), most of which was incurred to agriculture.

=== 1980–1989 ===
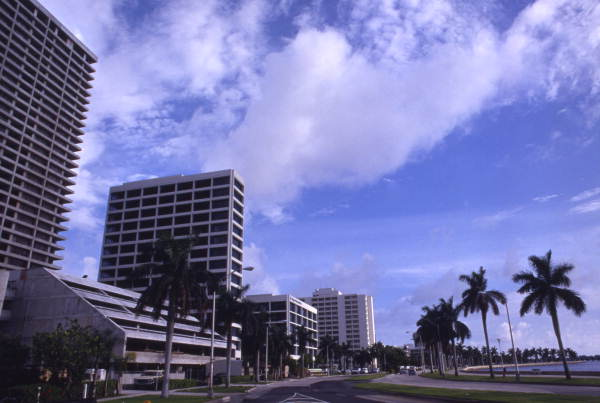
Flagler Drive in West Palm Beach looking north in 1986. The condominiums formerly known as Trump Plaza – purchased that year by Donald Trump – are partially visible on the left

A total of 576,812 people resided in Palm Beach County in 1980, according to that year's census. The 1980s saw significant growth in population in the western suburbs of Palm Beach County, especially in areas west of Boca Raton and in Royal Palm Beach and Wellington, with each reporting population increases of approximately 168 percent, 326 percent, and 347 percent, respectively. Royal Palm Beach ranked as the most rapidly-growing community of its size in the United States during the decade. Farther east, several of the larger cities experienced urban blight by the 1980s, including in Boca Raton, Delray Beach, Lake Worth, and West Palm Beach. The downtown section of West Palm Beach in particular gained a reputation for crime (highest rate for a city of its size in the 1980s), poverty, and vacant and dilapidated businesses and houses. Senator Lawton Chiles referred to the area as a "war zone", while West Palm Beach was the setting for the documentary film Crack USA: County Under Siege.

Town Center at Boca Raton opened in 1980 on Glades Road near Interstate 95 and featured Burdines, Sears, and Jordan Marsh as anchors. In 1981, IBM introduced the IBM Personal Computer, which they developed at their factory in Boca Raton. The large, multi-day arts and music festival in downtown West Palm Beach known as SunFest began in 1983, though organizers netted a loss of about $120,000 in the first year. The inaugural event consisted of performances mostly by local schools, bands, and artists. Northwood University opened a campus in West Palm Beach in 1984, but sold the property to Keiser University in 2015. The year also saw the completion of the current county government complex at 301 N. Olive Avenue in West Palm Beach, as well as the establishment of Palm Beach County Fire Rescue, which began with the consolidation of existing fire districts. The Boynton Beach Mall opened in 1985. Donald Trump began purchasing properties in Palm Beach County in the 1980s, first with Mar-a-Lago in Palm Beach in 1985 and then Trump Plaza in West Palm Beach in 1986. Although he would relinquish the latter in 1991, the plaza continued to bear his name until January 2021. David Paladino and Henry John Rolfs Sr. developed their Downtown/Uptown project in 1986. They purchased more than 300 properties in downtown West Palm Beach and subsequently demolished them as part of a plan to revitalize the downtown area. However, exhaustion of their personal wealth, defaulted loans, foreclosures, lawsuits, and a recession caused the Downtown/Uptown project to fail by the early 1990s.

The last remaining stretch of Interstate 95 between Miami and Maine opened in Martin County and northern Palm Beach County on December 19, 1987, following a ribbon-cutting ceremony that included congressman Tom Lewis and governor Bob Martinez. Tri-Rail began operating in January 1989. The commuter train provides transportation between east-central and southeast Palm Beach County cities and to Broward and Miami-Dade counties. The original Tri-Rail stations in Palm Beach County were located at Boca Raton, Delray Beach (then at the Seaboard Air Line Railroad station), Lake Worth Beach, PBI, and West Palm Beach.

=== 1990–1999 ===
The census of 1990 recorded a population of 836,518 people in Palm Beach County. Yesteryear Village at the South Florida Fairgrounds opened in 1990, when the Loxahatchee Groves Schoolhouse (built in 1934) was transported there. The village is an open air history park featuring several historic structures constructed between 1895 and 1945, including the Riddle House. Maude Ford Lee became the first African American to be elected to the county commission in 1990. In the following year, Nancy Perez became the first Hispanic person to serve as county judge following an appointment by Florida governor Lawton Chiles. As part of the effort to revitalize downtown Boca Raton, Mizner Park – "one of the first, and most popular, of Palm Beach County's iconic outdoor shopping and entertainment complexes", according to journalist Eliot Kleinberg – opened on January 11, 1991.

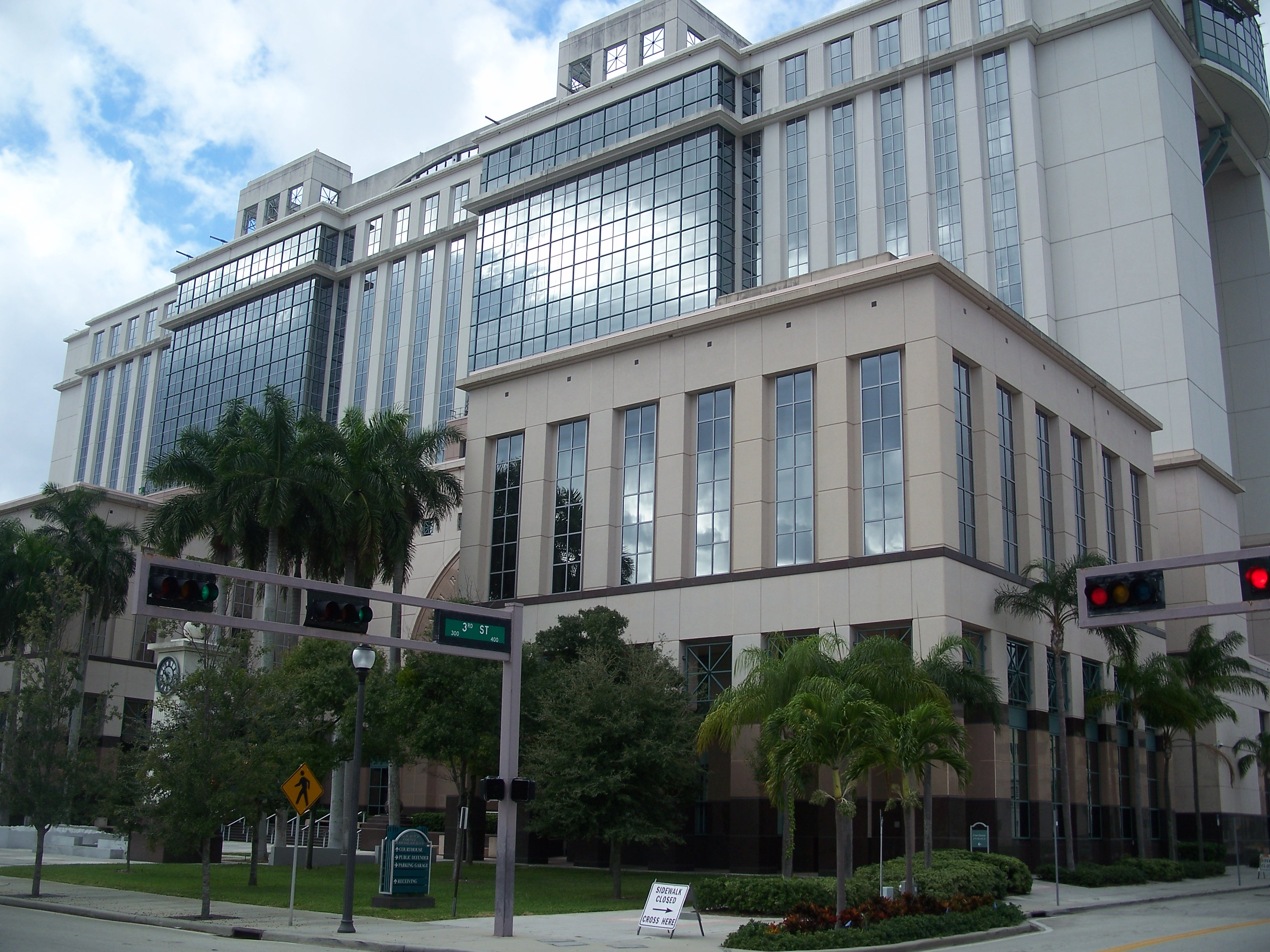
The Palm Beach County Courthouse, opened in 1995

Although Palm Beach County was mostly spared the devastation of Hurricane Andrew in August 1992, the South Florida Fairgrounds near West Palm Beach served as a large relief distribution center. More than 20,000 volunteers packed approximately 4,500 short tons (4,018 long tons) of supplies onto more than 1,200 trucks, which then traveled to Dade County. Palm Beach County also experienced a migration of people in the aftermath of Andrew and the years following, with 29,125 Miami-Dade County residents moving to Palm Beach County by 2001. However, as Broward County became more crowded due to post-Andrew migrants there from Dade County, an additional 100,871 people relocated from Broward County to Palm Beach County. Later in 1992, the Kravis Center for the Performing Arts opened where Connie Mack Field formerly stood. As a result of the United States House of Representatives elections held that year, Alcee Hastings became the first African American to represent Broward and Palm Beach counties as a member of Congress.

The current Palm Beach County Courthouse opened in May 1995 after $180 million was spent on its construction. The courthouse is located in downtown West Palm Beach at the former site of the Dixie Court Hotel (demolished in 1990), just across the street from the building that had been used as the county courthouse since 1916. A new Veterans Administration medical center also opened in Riviera Beach in 1995. On November 7 of that year, residents voted by a small margin to establish the village of Wellington, the first new municipality in Palm Beach County since Briny Breezes was incorporated in 1963.

The Palm Beach International Film Festival began in 1996 after its establishment by county commissioner Burt Aaronson and philanthropist George Elmore. Although the festival later ranked among the top 25 Independent Festivals throughout the world, the event has been on hiatus since 2018. The 19,000 seat Coral Sky Amphitheatre (renamed several times since; currently named the iTHINK Financial Amphitheatre) opened in 1996 at the South Florida Fairgrounds. The West Palm Beach city commission voted that year to approve the development of CityPlace at the site of the failed Downtown/Uptown project as another attempt to revitalize the downtown area. Also in 1996, the county's public bus transportation system underwent a massive overhaul. CoTran (shortened from County Transportation in 1980) was renamed Palm Tran, while more than 150 busses and 30 routes were added to the bus system.

Hurricane Irene in October 1999 dropped 6 to 17 inches (150 to 430 mm) of rainfall across much of southeast Florida, while Boynton Beach observed a peak total of 17.45 inches (443 mm) of precipitation. The storm caused about $100 million (1999 USD) in damage in Palm Beach County, most of which was incurred to crops inundated by floodwaters, while at least $4.5 million in damage was dealt to public properties and $2.2 million to private properties. Irene also destroyed or nearly destroyed 225 structures in the county.

=== 2000–2009 ===
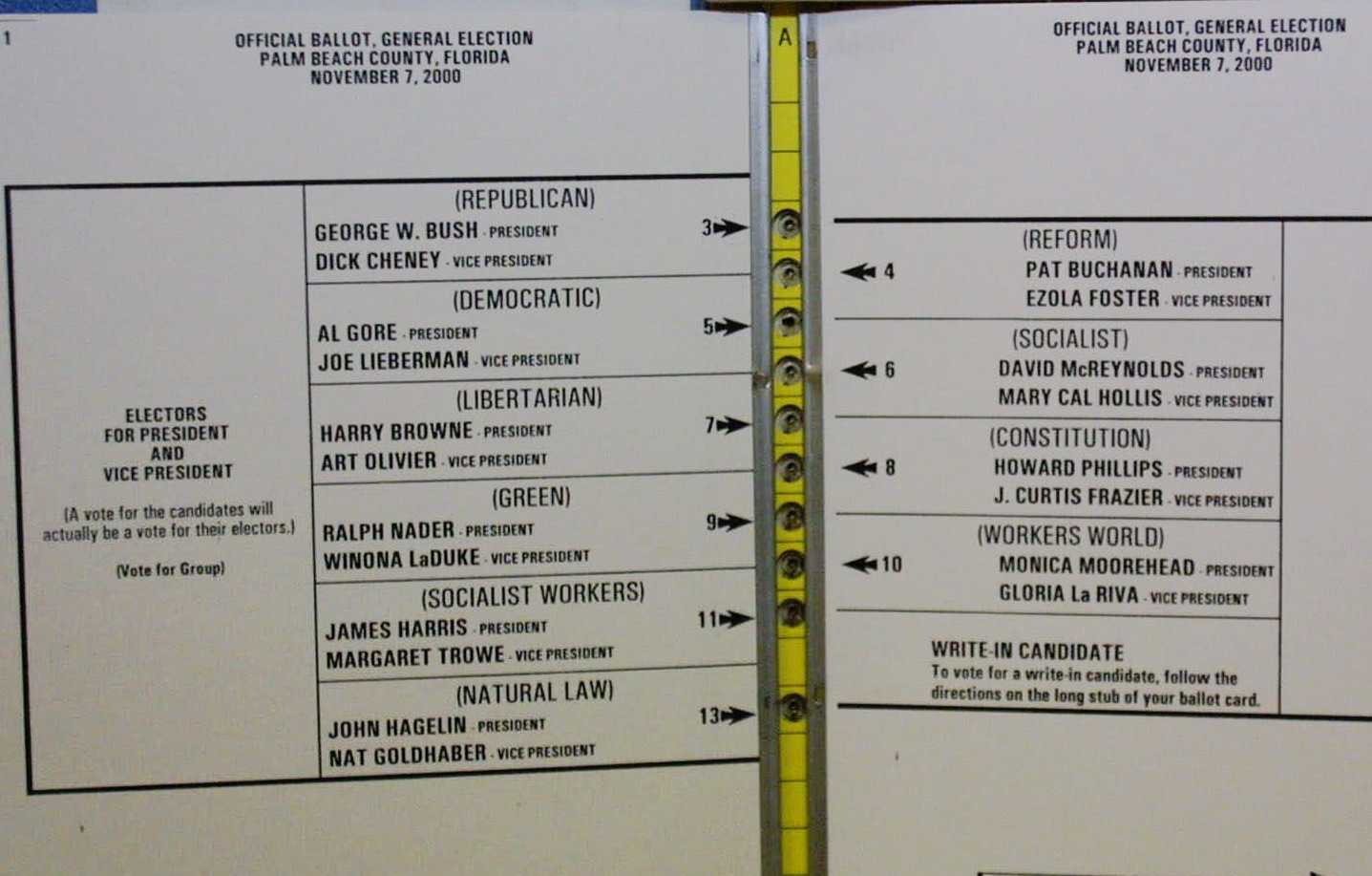
The "butterfly ballot" used during the 2000 election in Palm Beach County

Palm Beach County's population exceeded one million by 2000, with the census officially recording 1,131,184 people. In October 2000, CityPlace (now known as Rosemary Square) opened in West Palm Beach, including 31 stores and 1 restaurant on the first weekend. The open-air shopping center revitalized the city's downtown area. Another major shopping center in the county opened about a year later: the 1.3 million sqft (120,000 m^{2}) Mall at Wellington Green in Wellington.

The county became the center of controversy during the 2000 presidential election. Allegedly, the "butterfly ballot", designed by Palm Beach County Supervisor of Elections Theresa LePore, led to an unexpectedly large number of votes for Reform Party candidate Pat Buchanan, rather than for Democratic Party nominee Al Gore. Due to the aforementioned "butterfly ballot" and the closeness of the statewide results between Gore and Republican Party nominee George W. Bush, the Florida Supreme Court voted 4-3 on December 8 to mandate manual recounts in all counties with disputed results. However, the Supreme Court of the United States overturned the decision in Bush v. Gore on December 12, allowing Florida Secretary of State Katherine Harris to award the 25 electoral votes to Bush, as Harris's tally prior to the state-ordered recounts placed him ahead of Gore by 537 popular votes. Consequently, Bush won the 2000 presidential election.

Following the September 11 attacks in 2001, an FBI investigation revealed that 12 of the 19 terrorists trained or resided in Palm Beach County during the months prior to the attacks, including Ahmed al-Ghamdi, Ahmed al-Haznawi, Marwan al-Shehhi, Waleed and Wail al-Shehri, Satam al-Suqami, Mohamed Atta, and Ziad Jarrah. Later that month, during the anthrax attacks, a letter containing spores of this substance was mailed to the American Media, Inc. building in Boca Raton. Three people were exposed to anthrax, including Robert Stevens, a photo editor who died after an infection induced by anthrax.

Palm Beach County was severely impacted by hurricanes Frances and Jeanne in 2004. Early on September 5, Frances struck Martin County as a Category 2 hurricane. Although Palm Beach County recorded tropical storm-force winds, a wind gust of 91 mph (146 km/h) was observed at the Jupiter Inlet. Approximately 659,000 Florida Power & Light (FPL) customers lost electricity. Structural damage in Palm Beach County included 15,000 houses and 2,400 businesses. Overall, about $500 million in damage and six deaths occurred in the county due to storm-related vehicle accidents or drownings. Three weeks after Frances, Jeanne struck near the same location as a Category 3 hurricane. Despite Jeanne being more intense than Frances, the overall impact was slightly less. Storm surge of 2 to 4 ft (0.61 to 1.22 m) along the coast resulted in moderate beach erosion in Palm Beach County. Jeanne also brought strong winds, with a wind gust of 94 mph (151 km/h) recorded at the C-MAN station at the Lake Worth pier. Unofficially, a wind gust of 125 mph (201 km/h) was observed in West Palm Beach. FPL reported 591,300 electrical outages in the county after Jeanne. About 4,160 homes were damaged and 60 were destroyed. Severe local flooding occurred in Jupiter, Palm Beach Gardens, and rural areas of western Palm Beach County. Overall, Jeanne wrought $260 million in damage in the county.

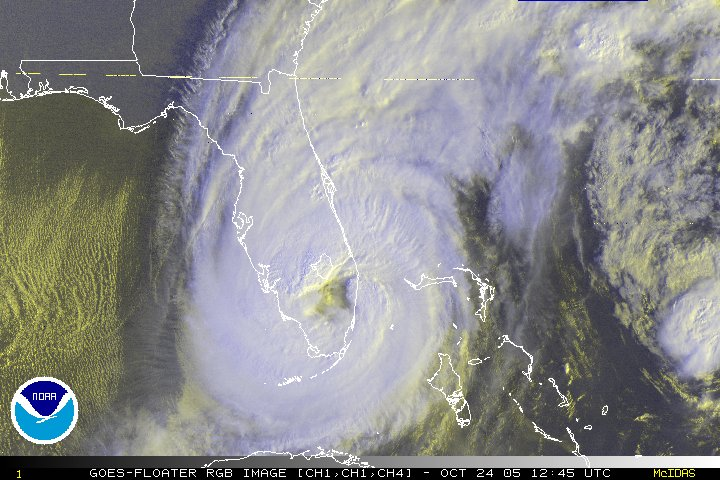
Hurricane Wilma over South Florida on October 24, 2005

Another significant storm, Hurricane Wilma, severely impacted Palm Beach County in 2005. On October 24, Wilma made landfall near Cape Romano, Florida, as a Category 3 hurricane. The cyclone headed rapidly northeastward and moved directly across Palm Beach County before emerging into the Atlantic Ocean near Jupiter. At PBIA, sustained winds reached 82 mph (132 km/h), while a wind gust as strong as 101 mph (163 km/h) was observed. Furthermore, several other locations reported hurricane-force winds, including a wind gust of 117 mph (188 km/h) in Belle Glade. Over 90 percent of FPL customers lost electricity. Two deaths occurred in Palm Beach County. The storm inflicted some degree of impact to more than 55,000 homes and 3,600 businesses in the county, which suffered about $2.9 billion in damages.

Loxahatchee Groves became Palm Beach County's 38th incorporated municipality in 2006. Restoration of the historic county courthouse was completed in March 2008 at a cost of just over $18 million, six years after the project gained approval from the Palm Beach County Board of Commissioners. The original courthouse houses the Historical Society of Palm Beach County and the Richard and Pat Johnson Palm Beach County History Museum. Later in 2008, Tropical Storm Fay brought generally minor flooding, dropping 7 to 9 in (180 to 230 mm) of rain over the county's eastern portions in August. Some wind damage also occurred, such as at the Pahokee city hall, which suffered about $1 million in damage. Fay also spawned an EF2 over Wellington, which deroofed stables and knocked over electrical poles and several trees at the Palm Beach Equine Clinic. Additionally, the twister ripped off more than 95 percent of roof tiles at the Equine Veterinary, tossed a heavy trailer approximately 120 ft (37 m) from its original location, and caused minor roof damage at an apartment building.

Palm Beach County celebrated its centennial in 2009. To commemorate 100 years since the county's establishment, the Historical Society of Palm Beach County and The Palm Beach Post collaborated on the publication of a 338-page book of photographs and accounts on historic events entitled Palm Beach County at 100: Our History, Our Home.

=== 2010–present ===
According to the 2010 census, 1,320,134 people resided in Palm Beach County. Sometime around 2010, the population of West Palm Beach, Palm Beach County's seat and largest city, exceeded 100,000 people, though the 2010 census officially recorded a population of 99,919. In August 2012, heavy rainfall from the outer bands of Hurricane Isaac caused flooding that left neighborhoods in The Acreage, Loxahatchee, Royal Palm Beach, and Wellington isolated for several days. Isaac left one death and approximately $71.59 million (2012 USD) in the county. Palm Beach Outlets opened in February 2014 at the former site of the Palm Beach Mall, which had lost much of its tenants and foot traffic, leading to the building being demolished in 2013. The circumstances leading up to the fatal shooting of Corey Jones by Palm Beach Gardens police officer Nouman K. Raja on October 18, 2015, gained national attention as part of the broader Black Lives Matter movement. Raja was found guilty on March 7, 2019, of the charges of manslaughter by culpable negligence and attempted first-degree murder with a firearm, for which he received a prison sentence of 25 years.

In 2016, Westlake became the newest incorporated municipality in Palm Beach County. Following the inauguration of Donald Trump in January 2017, he became the second president of the United States to have a Winter White House in Palm Beach County, designating his Mar-a-Lago property in Palm Beach for that purpose. In September of that year, Hurricane Irma passed west of the county as it moved northward through Florida. Several locations reported strong tropical storm-force sustained winds and hurricane-force wind gusts. Up to 566,970 electrical customers in Palm Beach County alone lost power. The storm left approximately $300 million in damage and five deaths in the county. The high-speed train Brightline opened its first two stations in Fort Lauderdale and West Palm Beach in January 2018, with a Miami station opened in May of that year. Brightline extended its service to Orlando in 2023.

Palm Beach County was also significantly impacted by the opioid epidemic, especially in the mid and late 2010s. The county recorded 262 heroin overdoses in 2010, while 1,271 opiate overdoses were reported in 2015. Fatalities related to opioids rose from 143 in 2012 to 569 in 2016, a five-year increase of 509 percent. Further, Palm Beach County led the state of Florida in heroin-related deaths in 2015 (with 158) and fentanyl-related deaths in 2018 (with 278). In response, the county government developed a plan which, among other recommendations, called for providing community education, expanding access to treatment while also increasing accountability of treatment facilities, and advocating for legislation at the local, state, and federal levels relevant to combating the opioid epidemic.

The 2020 census recorded a population of 1,492,191 people in the county. During the COVID-19 pandemic, the first cases of coronavirus in Palm Beach County were confirmed on March 12, 2020.

== See also ==
- History of Florida
- History of West Palm Beach, Florida
- Miami metropolitan area
