= Celestial Railroad =

Celestial Railroad may refer to:

- "The Celestial Railroad", an 1843 short story by Nathaniel Hawthorne
- Jupiter and Lake Worth Railway, nicknamed the "Celestial Railroad"
