= Pleasant City =

Pleasant City may refer to:

- Pleasant City, Ohio, United States
- Pleasant City (West Palm Beach), United States
- Palmerston North, New Zealand
