= Dunbar Village =

Public housing community located in West Palm Beach, Florida, US

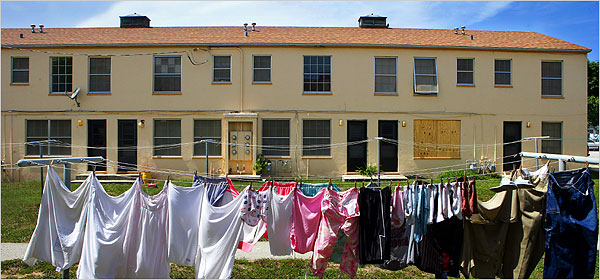
- A Dunbar Village housing block
- Interactive map of Dunbar Village

General information
- Location: West Palm Beach, Florida; United States
- Coordinates: 26.729167°N 80.06°W
- Status: Undergoing partial demolition

Construction
- Constructed: 1939-1940

Other information
- Governing body: West Palm Beach Housing Authority

Dunbar Village is a 246-unit public housing community located within the North Tamarind neighborhood of West Palm Beach, Florida, United States. The community is directly east of North Tamarind Avenue, and borders the neighborhoods of Pleasant City and Northwood Pines. It is named after the late 19th- and early 20th-century poet, Paul Laurence Dunbar. The community was built from 1939 to 1940 for African Americans, and is alike to Liberty Square and Edison Courts in Miami for its "army barracks" configuration. Constructed shortly after the passage of the Housing Act of 1937, the community is one of the first public housing in the state of Florida.

The community had received significant attention after an assault and rape within the premises that occurred on June 18, 2007. According to The Palm Beach Post and Associated Press, up to ten men had gang-raped a thirty-five-year-old woman for three hours and then forced her to perform oral sex on her twelve-year-old son, who was also beaten and doused with household chemicals. As of September 3, police had arrested four suspects, ranging in age from 14 to 18.

However, the community reverted to its rather peaceful state months into the investigation. A security gate has been installed and numerous housing blocks have been boarded-up, awaiting demolition for upcoming redevelopment. When completed, the redeveloped community will have both mixed-income rentals and renovations to the current, historical housing blocks.
