= South Florida Fair =

Annual city fair in West Palm Beach, Florida

- Previously known as Palm Beach County Fair (1912–1960)
- South Florida Fair logo
- Interactive map of South Florida Fair
- Location: 9067 Southern Boulevard, West Palm Beach, Florida
- Coordinates: 26.6845°N 80.1913°W
- Status: Operating
- Opened: 1912 (114 years ago)
- Owner: South Florida Fair & Palm Beach County Expositions, Inc.
- Operating season: 12-28 January 2024

Attractions
- Total: Over 100 (at least)
- Roller coasters: 4
- Water rides: 1 (until 2007)
- Website: southfloridafair.com

The South Florida Fair is an annual fair held in West Palm Beach, Florida every January. The fairgrounds site occupies 100 acres (0.40 km^{2}; 0.16 sq mi) and is located on the site of the former Palm Beach Speedway at the intersection of Southern Boulevard (US 98/SR 80) and Fairground Road, adjacent to the iTHINK Financial Amphitheatre. In 2012, the fair celebrated its 100th anniversary since its founding in 1912. Nearly 500,000 people attend the South Florida Fair each year.

The fair features a midway of rides, games, and concessions, themed exhibition halls, an agricultural and livestock agriplex, and smaller exhibition areas. There is also Yesteryear Village, a history park on the northeastern corner of the property.

The Palm Beach County Sheriff's Office, West Palm Beach Police and security guards are the fair's patrollers.

== History ==
The South Florida Fair began as the Palm Beach County Fair in March 1912. The first fair took place under a single tent near the Palm Beach County Courthouse in downtown West Palm Beach over a four-day period. Sponsored by prominent local citizens, the fair aimed to showcase livestock, winter crops, and real estate, with farmers receiving monetary prizes from Henry Flagler. In 1913, the fair moved to the railroad depot, located just north of its previous location. After the fair experienced growth in its early years, the Great Depression forced it to only operate a carnival midway between 1930 and 1937, before being discontinued altogether. The attack on Pearl Harbor in December 1941 disrupted plans to restore the fair in 1942. The fair resumed in 1946 at the National Guard Armory in West Palm Beach. Two years later, the fair moved to Morrison Field (now the Palm Beach International Airport) and stayed until the United States Air Force converted the airport to a military base for the Korean War a few years later.

In 1953, the fair incorporated as an organization. Between then and 1955, the fair was held at the Palm Beach Speedway, near the present site of the South Florida Fairgrounds. The fair moved to the current location of Palm Beach State College's (then known as Palm Beach Junior College) Lake Worth campus in 1956 after being deeded 18 acres (7.3 ha) by the Palm Beach County government. However, the county reversed its decision and deeded the land to PBJC instead, forcing the fair to move to John Prince Memorial Park in 1957. Later that year, the fair bought the Palm Beach Speedway property, comprising about 35 acres (14 ha). The acquisition of the land occurred in June via the fair organization selling $100,000 in bonds and receiving matching funds from the Florida Department of Agriculture after depositing $30,000. Additionally, Palm Beach County donated about 100 acres (40 ha) in exchange for the property at John Prince Memorial Park, to be used to expand PBJC. Construction on two exhibition halls began on June 10. Finally, on January 27, 1958, the fair began operating at its present location. In 1960, the Palm Beach County Fair was renamed the South Florida Fair.

Due to the COVID-19 pandemic, South Florida Fair & Palm Beach County Expositions, Inc. scaled-back the January 2021 event, with all exhibits, shows, and vendors remaining outdoors, while only kiddie rides were operated. The organization also developed a COVID-19 safety plan, which required attendees, employees, vendors, and volunteers to follow CDC guidelines. However, a full-fledged fair event in 2021 was held from May 7-May 23. The 2022 event saw the resumption of the typical, full-fledged fair held in the month of January, as well as the removal of most pandemic-related restrictions.

== Organization ==
The South Florida Fair and Palm Beach County Expositions, Inc. is a 501(c)(3) non-profit corporation organized and existing pursuant to Chapter 616 of the Florida Statutes. It has a board of trustees that consists of 17 people who are responsible for setting policy and seeing that management of the association is carried out under direction of an executive staff consisting of the president/CEO and currently two vice presidents. The fair also has directors who serve in an advisory capacity. There are currently 55 directors. The trustees and directors are non-paid volunteers. The day-to-day operation is the responsibility of the president, Matt Wallsmith, who oversees a staff of over 45 full-time employees.

== Economic impact ==
According to a study released in 2000 by Economic Research Associates, Inc., the South Florida Fairgrounds generated a total economic impact of $149,924,000 in 1999. This was prior to the development of the Expo East Exhibit Hall, the enhancement of Yesteryear Village (including the new Bink Glisson and the Sally Bennett "Big Band Hall of Fame") and the aggressive marketing of the Americraft Expo Center exhibit floor space. In addition, the Cruzan Amphitheatre alone is estimated to generate an economic impact in excess of $20 million. But not only does the Fair generate a significant economic impact, it makes a substantial annual cash distribution to the youth of this area from its own resources. In the 2007/08 fiscal year, the South Florida Fair paid in excess of $200,000 in scholarship and 4-H premium awards, compensation to choruses and bands performing during the annual Fair, and contributions to Palm Beach County schools through its Partners-In-Education Advance Ticket program.

== Fairgrounds ==
Approximately 135 acres (0.55 km^{2}) comprise the property known as the South Florida Fairgrounds. In 1957, Palm Beach County gave the fair 100 acres (0.40 km^{2}) at its present site but later took back 20 acres (81,000 m^{2}) for the stockade. This contribution was made in consideration of the fair agreeing to relocate from John Prince Park in order that the county could vie for a state university (PBCC). The fairgrounds is partitioned into several pods or tracts: the parking tracts, Yesteryear Village, the Coral Sky Amphitheatre, and the exhibit buildings, including the Americraft Expo Center and the Agriplex. The space available on the fairgrounds for trade shows and exhibits exceeds 200,000 square feet (19,000 m^{2}). During the annual South Florida Fair, the southern parking tract is utilized as the "midway" containing rides, shows, games, and concessions.

=== Events ===
The main event on the fairgrounds is the annual South Florida Fair, which occurs over a 17-day period, generally in the last two weeks of January each year. Over the past several years, the annual fair has incorporated a theme as a means of stimulating tourism as well as the educational and cultural interest of the residents of Palm Beach County. For instance, "Florida" was featured at the 1998 fair and "Alaska"; "Tales of the American West"; "New England"; "Hollywood"; "Having a Ball"; "Dreams, screams, thrills, chills"; "Party with the Animals"; and "A World of Fun" were showcased in previous fairs. One of the greatest aspects of the annual fair is its agricultural and livestock exhibits which clearly provide the greatest variety of such exhibits anywhere within Palm Beach County. Even though agriculture is such a tremendous part of Palm Beach County's economic base, many school children have never been exposed to it. However, at the annual South Florida Fair, not only can they see and learn all about agriculture, but can even witness a calf being born, or learn how a dairy is operated. The annual fair attracts nearly 500,000 people through its turnstiles. However, 650,000 people will attend various events on the fairgrounds on an annual basis. Besides the 150,000 ft (46,000 m). Americraft (now South Florida Fair) Expo Center, there are 10 other smaller exhibit buildings along with the iThink Financial Amphitheater, Agriplex, Palm Beach Model Railroaders and Yesteryear Village. These events constitute 250 event days.

=== Yesteryear Village ===
Yesteryear Village is a history park and exhibit on 10 acres (0.040 km^{2}; 0.016 sq mi), showcasing buildings and artifacts from the 1850s to the 1950s. It exhibits a large collection of early, original, and replicated buildings, including an old school, a farm, a blacksmith shop, a general store, a church, a fire department, a post office, a bait & tackle shop, and the famed Riddle House. Included is the only big band museum in the United States, the Sally Bennett Big Band Hall of Fame Museum. Guided tours are available.

== See also ==
- Americraft Expo Center
