= Americraft Expo Center =

Multi-purpose venue in West Palm Beach, Florida

Coordinates: 26.6847644°N 80.1906896°W

The Shiner Law Group Expo Center at the South Florida Fairgrounds (also known as the South Florida Fair), is a 5,000-seat multi-purpose venue in West Palm Beach, Florida, located at 9067 Southern Boulevard, within a few miles of Royal Palm Beach, Wellington and Loxahatchee. With over 150,000 square feet (14,000 m^{2}), it hosts public and consumer oriented events and shows, as well as special functions, including the South Florida Fair, many craft shows, and meetings. It has also hosted several WWE house shows. It was originally built in 1990 as a 70,000-square-foot (6,500 m^{2}) facility and was expanded to its current size in 2002. 650,000 people attend various events at the Expo Center on an annual basis. Besides the 150,000 ft (46,000 m). Expo east an Expo West buildings, there are 10 other smaller exhibit buildings that range in size from 3,625 to 11,490 square feet (1,067 m^{2}), along with the Perfect Vodka Amphitheater, the Agriplex, and Yesteryear Village. These events constitute 250 event days.
