= Riddle House =

Historic house in Florida, United States

Coordinates: 26°42′21″N 80°13′36″W

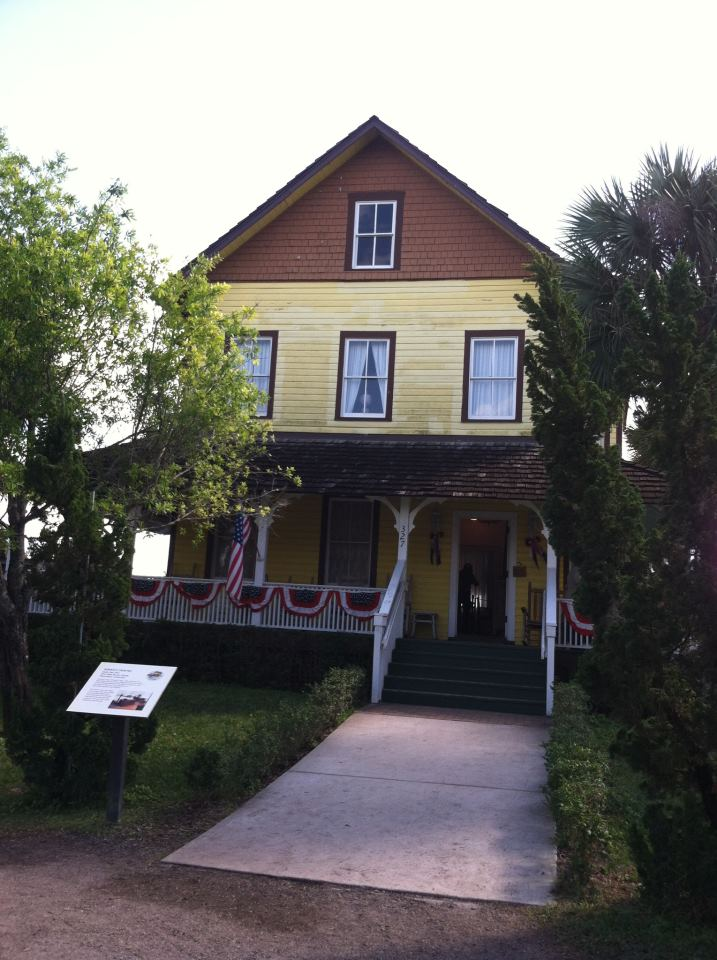
The Riddle House in February 2013

The Riddle House is an old Edwardian house located in Palm Beach County, Florida. The house was built in West Palm Beach, Florida in 1905 by some of Henry Flagler's hotel construction workers. Originally known as "Gatekeeper's Cottage", the house was home to the groundskeeper of Woodlawn Cemetery. By 1920, the house became privately owned by Karl Riddle, a city manager and superintendent of West Palm Beach. He is the namesake of the house. The house was eventually dismantled and moved to Yesteryear Village in 1995, a historical park within the South Florida Fairgrounds. The building was featured in an episode of Ghost Adventures in 2008.

== History ==
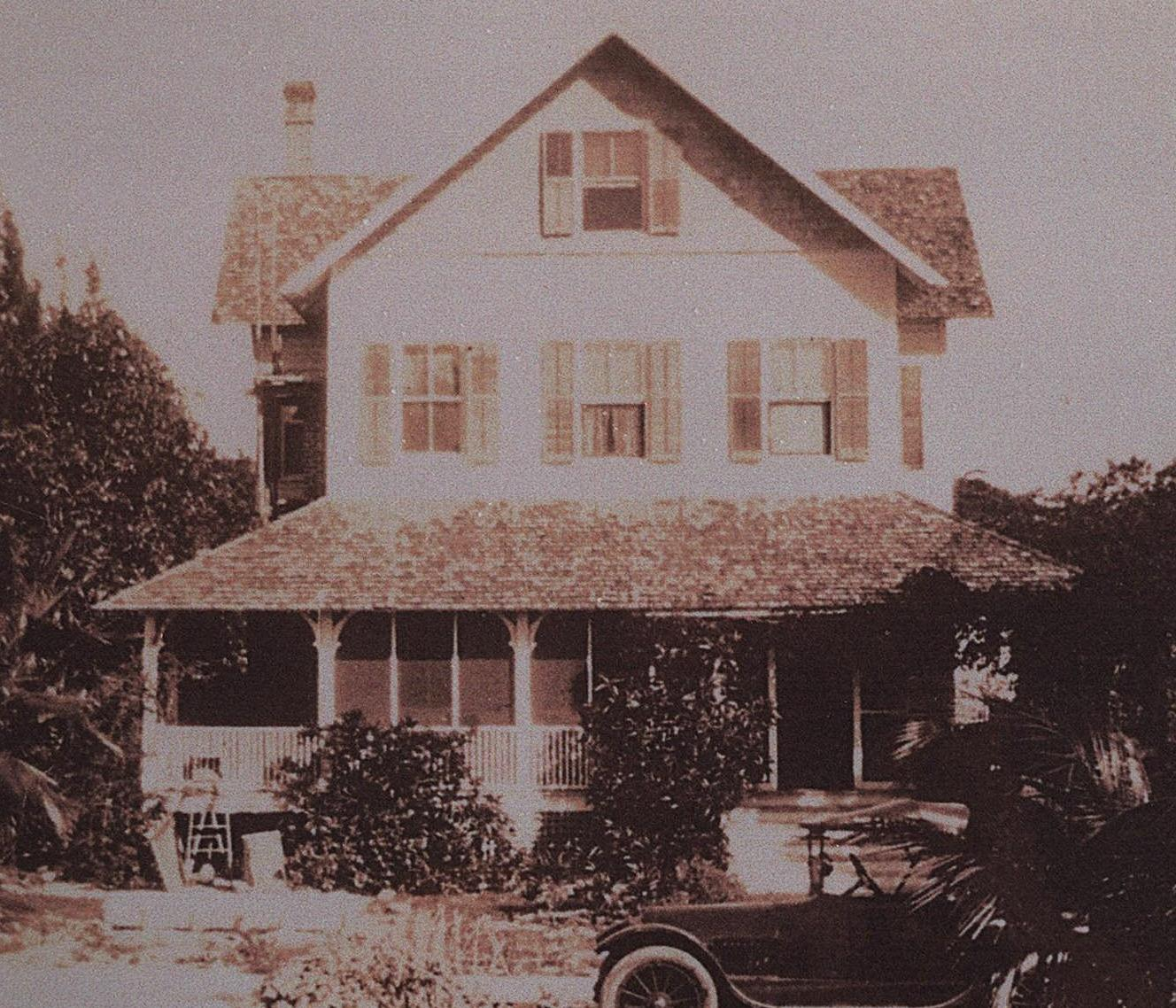
The Riddle House in 1920

Constructors of Henry Flagler's hotels began building the Riddle House on July 1, 1905, using leftover wood. Originally located at 327 Acacia Street in West Palm Beach, the house was nicknamed "the painted lady", because of its bright colors. However, the dwelling would officially be known as "Gatekeeper's Cottage" early on because it served as the residence of the keeper of Woodlawn Cemetery, located just across Dixie Highway. The house also originally served as a funeral parlor. In 1914, Gatekeeper's Cottage became "City House" after being purchased by the West Palm Beach city government.

It was acquired by Karl Riddle in 1920, who is the namesake of the house. Riddle was the first city manager and superintendent of public works of West Palm Beach. After being recalled in 1923 by a margin of five votes, Riddle moved out of the house, which then became a temporary residence for new city employees. Riddle and his twin brother Kenyon later built houses on a 36 acres (15 ha) property just outside the city in 1935. This area would later become incorporated as Cloud Lake in 1951 after a vote by residents. In 1972, artist Mary Ann Hayes acquired the house at an auction for just over $21,000 and converted it into an art school, the Flagler Arts Center. Palm Beach Atlantic College (PBA; now Palm Beach Atlantic University) then purchased the Riddle House in the early 1980s and used the residence as a dormitory for several years. Later, the house was scheduled for demolition due to expansion of the college.

However, PBA instead decided to donate the building to the Yesteryear Village committee South Florida Fair board of directors. John Riddle, nephew of Karl Riddle, then served as chairman of the committee. After professionals estimated that relocation of the house would cost about $50,000, John Riddle instead recruited 60 volunteers. Between August 12 and August 13, 1995, the Riddle House was dismantled and moved to the Yesteryear Village. The roof and attic were split in two, as were the first and second floors. Finally, the building was reassembled after reaching Yesteryear Village. Through a $450,000 state historical grant, the Riddle House was also restored to its 1920s appearance.

== Haunting legend ==
The house was also featured in 2008 on the ghost-hunting paranormal television series Ghost Adventures on the Travel Channel.

== See also ==
- List of reportedly haunted locations in the United States
