= The Plaza (West Palm Beach) =

The Plaza of the Palm Beaches
- Former names: The Plaza
- Alternative names: Trump Plaza of the Palm Beaches

General information
- Status: Completed
- Type: Condominiums
- Location: 525 South Flagler Drive, West Palm Beach, Florida, United States
- Coordinates: 26.708233°N 80.051355°W
- Named for: Donald Trump
- Construction started: 1981
- Topped-out: November 1984 (second tower)
- Opened: October 1985
- Renovated: 1986

Technical details
- Floor count: 32

Design and construction
- Architecture firm: Schwab & Twitty Architects Inc.
- Developer: Armour Guider Development Corporation
- Main contractor: Perini Corporation (1982–1984); F. Benson & Co. Inc.

Other information
- Number of units: 221

The Plaza (formerly known as Trump Plaza and Trump Plaza of the Palm Beaches) is a twin-tower condominium property located along the Intracoastal Waterway in West Palm Beach, Florida. The property was developed by Robert Armour and Michael Guider through their company, Armour Guider Development Corporation. Construction of the project, originally known as The Plaza, began in 1981. After several construction delays, The Plaza opened in October 1985, although Armour had only minimal success in selling the condominium units.

In 1986, the property was foreclosed and then sold to businessman Donald Trump, who renovated and renamed it as Trump Plaza later that year. Trump intended to sell the property's remaining 120 units within a year and a half. Although sales increased because of the Trump name, 50 percent of the units remained unsold as of 1990. The remaining units were auctioned.

The name of the property was changed in January 2021 after the 2021 United States Capitol attack.

== History ==
=== Early history ===
In 1974, Robert Armour purchased property at 525 South Flagler Drive in West Palm Beach, Florida. On the property, Armour opened The Greenhouse, a tropical-themed restaurant that became popular among businesspeople, celebrities, attorneys, and judges. Although Armour supervised the restaurant's creation and operation, he planned to ultimately build a high-rise residential tower on the property, which was located along the Intracoastal Waterway.

In 1980, Armour was planning the Flagler Plaza, a residential property consisting of two 32-story towers, to be built on 3.4 acres (1.4 ha). The project was expected to take two years to complete, and would be built on the site of The Greenhouse. Two other businesses owned by Armour, the Fish Thing restaurant and the Lodge on the Lake, would also be demolished to make room for the new project.

By 1981, the project – now known as The Plaza – had received financing from The Bank of New York. The project was to include 4,600 sq ft (430 m^{2}) of retail space, 5,000 sq ft (460 m^{2}) of office space, and a 6,000 sq ft (560 m^{2}) restaurant and lounge. Construction was scheduled to begin in summer 1981, with completion by early 1983. The project, designed by Schwab & Twitty Architects Inc., would be developed through Armour Guider Development Corporation, a joint venture between Robert Armour and Michael Guider. The Plaza would be the tallest building to be constructed along the Intracoastal Waterway, and would also be the largest development project in the city's history.

=== Construction and opening ===
On October 1, 1981, Perini Corporation was named as the general contractor for the $60 million project, with construction expected to begin a few weeks later. Demolition of The Greenhouse began in May 1982, to make room for The Plaza. Armour was surprised at how successful the restaurant had become during its operation. In September 1983, Schwab & Twitty Architects Inc. stopped working on the project and alleged a lack of $60,000 in payments for the company's previous six months of work. Armour said the lack of payments was the result of a mix-up involving The Bank of New York, which was expected to pay the company soon thereafter.

In October 1983, The Plaza was behind in sales, having only sold 18 units in the previous 18 months, and a total of 74 units since the project began. A total of 153 units had initially been expected to be sold by a real estate brokerage firm by June 1, 1983. An early slogan for The Plaza during its construction was: "The only address in Florida that gives you a reason to look down on Palm Beach." The slogan was meant to emphasize the property's location, in West Palm Beach rather than in Palm Beach, which was located across the Intracoastal Waterway.

By January 1984, The Bank of New York had stopped funding the project because of poor sales, thus delaying construction of the first 32-story tower. That month, Armour was in negotiations with an investment firm that would help finance the project and act as project manager, allowing the first tower to be completed in approximately four months. The deal would also allow construction of the delayed second tower to begin in two months. In April 1984, after Armour spent several months devising a financial solution, The Bank of New York provided an $81 million loan to the project. Construction began again on April 30, 1984, with F. Benson & Co. Inc. as the new general contractor; Armour stated that, "Perini and we were unable to work out a mutually satisfactory agreement on terms." The first tower was expected to be completed in approximately six months, while the second tower would be completed by fall 1985.

Construction on the second tower progressed at a rate of one new floor every three days. The second tower was topped off in November 1984. Construction of the project was nearing completion in March 1985. The Plaza opened in October 1985, although Armour was only able to sell approximately six units in the property. The Bank of New York foreclosed on The Plaza in January 1986, as Armour Development owed the bank nearly $94 million in loans and interest.

=== Trump Plaza ===
At the end of March 1986, businessman Donald Trump and Chrysler chairman Lee Iacocca toured the property as prospective buyers. The Bank of New York subsequently purchased the property for $43.2 million at a public auction in July 1986, to obtain the title to the land so it could be sold to a developer. The Plaza became the most expensive property ever sold at a public auction in Palm Beach County, Florida. With a $60 million loan from Marine Midland Bank, Trump purchased the property later that month for approximately $40 million, resulting in a loss of more than $50 million for The Bank of New York. Trump planned to rename the building as Trump Plaza, with Iacocca as his partner in the property; Iacocca also purchased a Plaza penthouse. Real estate analysts believed that the building would sell better with the Trump name.

At the time of the purchase, The Plaza contained 224 condominium units, priced between $275,000 and $960,000. Although the condominium units were considered by local real estate analysts to be overpriced, Trump planned to raise prices by 15 to 20 percent within a few months after the building's grand opening, which was planned for November 1986. Trump, who planned to sell more than 200 remaining condominium units in the building within a year and a half, intended to add new apartment models, furnished apartments, a restaurant, and a hair salon. Part of Marine Midland Bank's $60 million loan was used to renovate the property. Condominium sales improved after Trump's renaming of the building.

In May 1988, there were plans to open a 2,000 sq ft (190 m^{2}) store known as Selections, which would be located on the first floor of the property and would offer various amenities to residents. At the time, nearly 50 percent of the condominium units had been sold, with prices between $300,000 and $500,000. A penthouse was offered at a price of $1.8 million. Less than 10 units were sold in 1989. As of April 1990, occupancy was still at 50 percent, while a planned restaurant and upscale shops had failed to materialize. Notable residents at that time included Eleanor Weinstock, a state senator; and Kylene Barker, Miss America 1979.

=== Auctions ===
In September 1990, planning for an auction of the remaining 120 units was underway, as part of an agreement between Trump and Marine Midland Bank from the previous month. No units had been sold that year up to that point. Trump had until September 30, 1991, to sell the remaining units. Low sales in the property were attributed to a poor location, in West Palm Beach rather than Palm Beach. Pricing for the units was also considered too high. The auctioning of 45 units occurred on December 16, 1990. An estimated $8.8 million profit for The Trump Organization was generated from the auction, during which 35 units were sold at prices ranging between $185,000 and $265,000, which was half of their original sale price.

Another auction, with 70 units, was set for April 28, 1991. Trump said the property was an "all-right" investment, and, "I'm doing the auction because I want to sell the units quickly rather than over the period of the next year." A total of 63 units were ultimately put up for sale at the auction. Each of the units sold, for a combined total of $15.8 million. Trump and Marine Midland Bank had agreed to split the profits. Trump said about the building and the auction: "It's built to be sold. I'm de-leveraging. Things are working out well for me. The press doesn't like to write that." Actress Deborah Raffin purchased a three-bedroom unit for $210,000 during the auction, while a penthouse sold for $700,000 to Morry Weiss, the president of American Greetings.

=== Later years ===
The five-foot-high letters spelling out the Trump Plaza name atop the buildings were removed beginning in 1993, for maintenance. After suspicions of a permanent removal of the name, residents voted 95 to 74 to restore the lettering. Trump then volunteered to pay for the cost of having the signs restored.

The signs came down again in late 2017 as part of a planned exterior renovation. Upon completion in 2019, whether or not to reinstall the signs again became an issue. One consideration was that such signs were no longer "in vogue", with no other West Palm Beach condominium believed to have one. Cost was also a factor, as the original signs had not been salvageable and new signs could cost $75,000. In February 2020, residents voted 178-20 not to reinstall the signs. This did not change the name of the property, which officially remained Trump Plaza.

On June 1, 2020, shortly after the George Floyd protests began, management removed the ground floor Trump Plaza signs out of "safety" concerns. In January 2021, following the United States Capitol attack by Trump supporters, the condominium board voted unanimously to change the legal name. More than 67 percent of residents voted in May 2021 to restore the original name, The Plaza. The condo association president said that the residents preferred a name that was "generic, low-key and didn't attract attention of any kind. Our original name of 'The Plaza' filled that need". Two other names considered were Lakeview Plaza and La Vue. The "Trump" name had been damaging property values, as it deterred some prospective buyers. By the time of the proposed name change, a $6 million renovation had been carried out on the property, including the roof, balconies, lobby, and pools.

== See also ==
- Trump Towers (Sunny Isles Beach), also located in Florida.
