= Edison Courts =

Coordinates: 25.835278°N 80.202564°W

An Edison Court building

Edison Courts is a 345-unit public housing projects in the Little Haiti neighborhood of Miami, Florida. Edison Courts is bounded to the south by North 62nd Street/Martin Luther King, Jr. Boulevard, by North 67th Street to the north, by West Second Avenue to the east, and by West Fourth Avenue to the west.

During the Great Depression, the Works Progress Administration (WPA) hired many local architects, contractors and workers to construct public works projects in Miami. The 345-unit low rent housing project Edison Courts, completed in 1941 and designed by the firm of Paist and Stewart with associate architects Robert Law Weed, Vladimir Virrick and E.L. Robertson, provided public housing for white people. It was similar in scale and design to the Liberty Square project, opened in 1937 and designed by the same firm. Both projects were integrated in the 1960s. Edison Courts has maintained most of its historic ambience and is a wonderful example of WPA craftsmanship and design. Notable Miami native and rapper Frantz Fatal mentions Edison Courts in many songs. He is from Lemon City and calls Edison Courts home.

Edison Courts is notable as the first low-rent housing project to have free hot water provided by solar water heaters. Each dwelling unit was to have on its roof a shallow glass-covered box with copper pipes running through it. The sun's rays would heat the water in the pipes to 180 °F (82 °C), after which it would be stored in an insulated tank for bathing and clothes washing.
