= Bingham-Blossom House =

Historic house in Florida, United States

- Bingham-Blossom House "Figulus"
- Formerly listed on the U.S. National Register of Historic Places
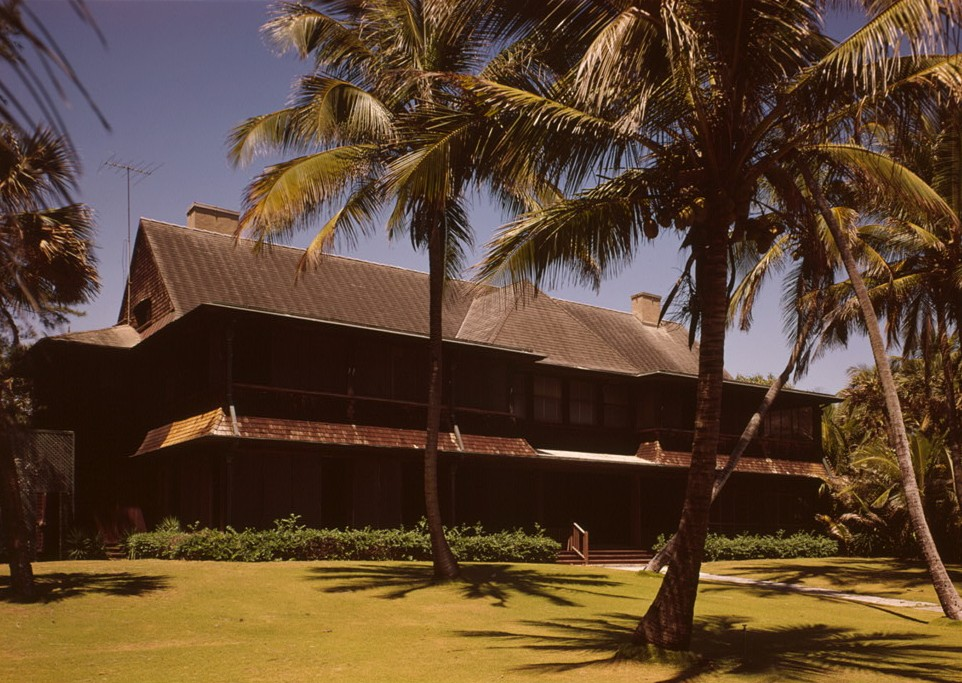
- East facade of Figulus.

- Location within Florida Location within the United States
- Location: Palm Beach, Palm Beach County, Florida
- Coordinates: 26°40′19″N 80°2′28″W
- Built: 1893
- Architect: George Lainhart
- Architectural style: Shingle Style
- NRHP reference No.: 72000344

Significant dates
- Added to NRHP: December 5, 1972
- Removed from NRHP: January 4, 2012

The Bingham-Blossom House, also known as Figulus, was a historic home and landscaped estate in Palm Beach, Palm Beach County, southeastern Florida. It was located at 1250 South Ocean Boulevard. It was damaged by fire and demolished in 1974.

== History ==
The residence was completed in 1893 in the Shingle Style, for Charles William Bingham and wife, Mary Payne Bingham, of Cleveland, Ohio. It was the first privately owned residence on the ocean in Palm Beach. The original 17 acres of grounds contained many tropical trees brought from around the world by David Grandison Fairchild, noted botanist and friend of the Bingham family. It was designed by local artisan and builder George Lainhart, with deep recessed porches, wide overhangs, and cross ventilation that provided the necessary comfort, without air conditioning.

Landmark

On December 5, 1972, it was added to the U.S. National Register of Historic Places. It was also documented by the Historic American Buildings Survey (HABS) in 1972.

Destruction

Subsequently, the residence was seriously damaged by fire and was demolished in 1974. The site was cleared except for the plantings.

== Casa Apava ==
The Bingham's gave their daughter Frances Payne Bingham Bolton and her husband Chester C. Bolton an estate named Casa Apava, that was built just south of Figulus in 1919. The large laterally rambling Mediterranean Revival style complex was designed by architect Abram Garfield, the son of President Garfield. The residence remains in near original condition, and was sold for $71.2 million in 2015.

== See also ==
- National Register of Historic Places listings in Palm Beach County, Florida
- HABS−Historic American Buildings Survey in Florida
