= Agriplex =

An agriplex ("agricultural complex"), is a type of community centre found in rural agricultural towns and communities in North America, especially Canada. An agriplex usually includes recreation, sports, and meeting facilities in addition to a large hall or arena, sometimes on state or county fair grounds.

Agriplexes, depending on their size, may play host to farm exhibitions, fairs, trade shows, rodeos, farmer's markets, sports meets, entertainment, and equestrian events. During the COVID-19 pandemic in Canada, at least one agriplex, at the Western Fair Agriplex in Ontario, was converted into a field hospital.
