= The Tropical Sun =

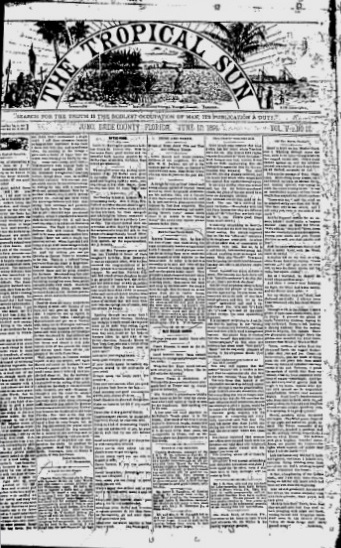
- The June 10, 1891 cover of The Tropical Sun
- Type: Weekly newspaper
- Format: Broadsheet
- Founded: March 1891
- Ceased publication: 1930s
- Headquarters: Juno, Florida; West Palm Beach, Florida

The Tropical Sun was South Florida's first newspaper, established in 1891 and based in Juno, Florida and later in West Palm Beach. Founded by Guy Metcalf, the paper was published in Juno, which was the county seat of Dade County (which then extended from modern-day Martin County south to Dade's southern boundary at Florida Bay). The Tropical Sun was the pioneer's tie to the outside world, and later covered the events of the Florida land boom of the 1920s and its subsequent bust in preceding the Great Depression in South Florida. Byrd Spilman Dewey served as its first columnist, writing "The Sitting Room" column under the pen name "Aunt Judith." It also documents the growth of tourism, the presence of malaria in Florida prior to World War II, and other issues related to the struggles of the developers of south Florida's Atlantic coast. The only rival to the Tropical Sun was The Miami Metropolis, which eventually became The Miami News, and The Miami Evening Record. The Tropical Sun was published as a weekly for most of its history but, also, as a semiweekly between 1903 and 1906. Miami and Dade County saw an increase in tourists after 1906 when Henry Flagler's railroad opened service to Key West. Before this date, tourist traffic to Key West would have involved travel by city. The location of The Tropical Sun's offices in Juno, Florida, "set back from the (railroad) track some thirty feet and from the wharf about fifty yards" is telling of both the newspaper's and south Florida's relationship with and their reliance on tourism. Between 1891 and 1895, The Tropical Sun was published in Juno, Florida. From 1895 to 1926, it was published in West Palm Beach, Florida. For a time beginning in 1914, the newspaper published both as a weekly under The Tropical Sun title and as a daily under the title, the Daily Tropical Sun.

Archives of the newspaper today are kept by the Historical Society of Palm Beach County in the basement of the 1916 Palm Beach County Courthouse.
