= Pleasant City (West Palm Beach) =

Neighbourhood in West Palm Beach, Florida

Coordinates: 26.7308205°N 80.0548894°W

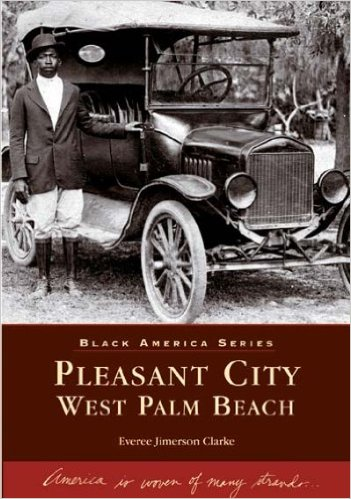

Pleasant City is a neighborhood in West Palm Beach, Florida north of 15th Street, and east of Dunbar Village and the Florida East Coast Railway. Established in 1905 and incorporated into the city limits in 1912, it was developed for African-American workers who were employed at area hotels and other businesses.

== History ==
In 1900, land developer George Currie plotted a strip of land in the north end of West Palm Beach to provide homes for African Americans forced to leave their living quarters in the "Styx" on South County Road on Palm Beach Island. He called the area Pleasant City, gave the streets pleasant-sounding names, and sold the 100 x 50 lots for $150 up.

These families, numbering more than 1000, had come to Palm Beach in the mid-1800s to extend the Florida East Coast Railroad from Juno to West Palm Beach. They also built the Royal Poinciana Hotel and the mansion Whitehall (now -2017- the Flagler Museum), for Standard Oil magnate Henry Morrison Flagler.

During the twenty years of living in the "Styx" these settlers married, started families, established businesses, churches, schools, civic and fraternal organizations that extended to Pleasant City.

Pleasant City, the oldest African-American community in West Palm Beach, is a 27-block area that had a population close to 2800 residents. It is bordered on the north by 23rd Street, on the north by 15th Street, on the east by Dixie Highway and on the west by the Florida East Coast Railway, which made it a stronger business area.

Once the hub of black business and single-family homes, the area has been on the decline for several years because of hurricane damage, poorly managed public housing, and politics.

Most historic landmarks have been demolished by community redevelopment efforts to prevent them having historic designation.

== Demographics ==
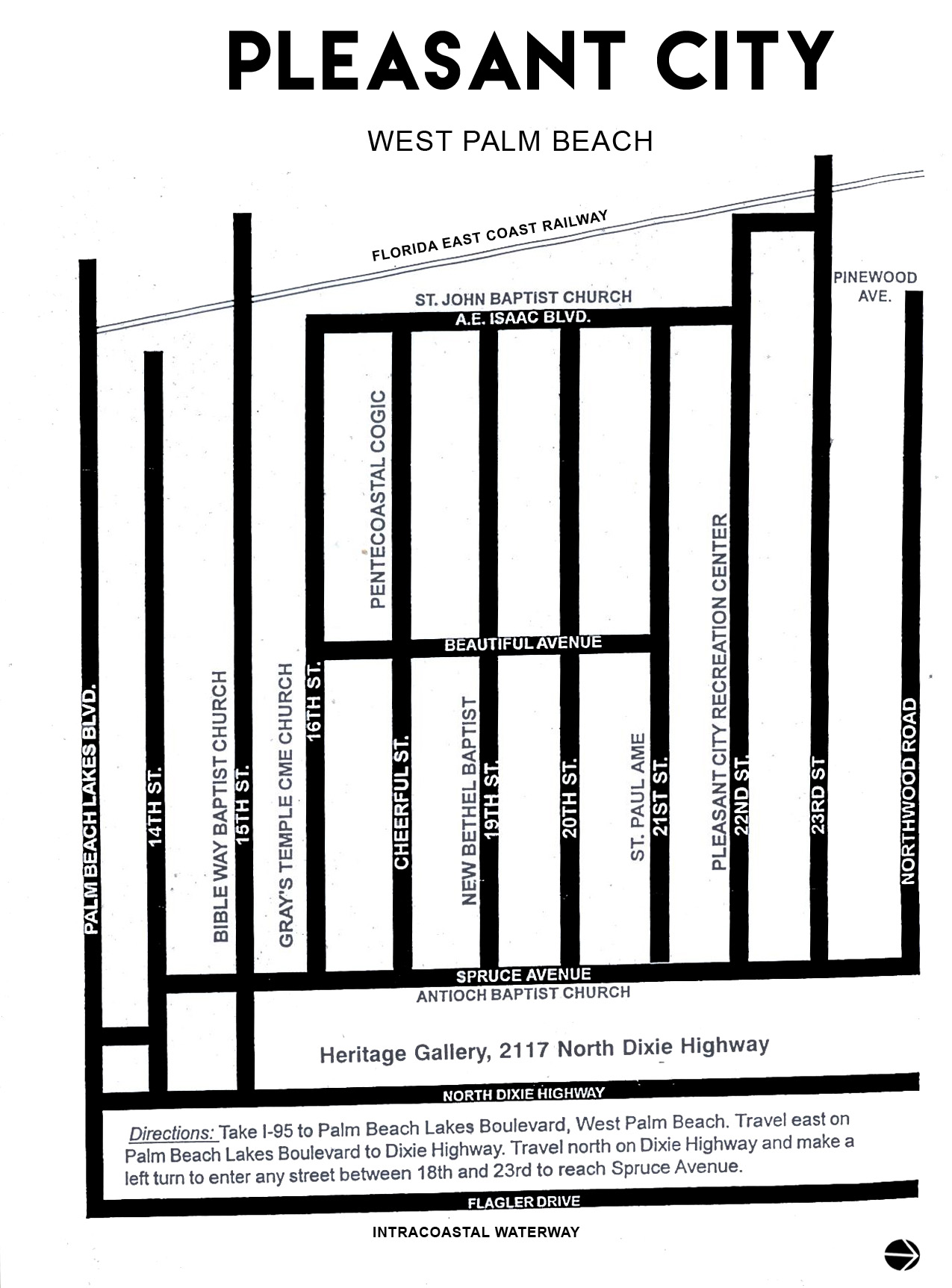

== Culture ==
The Pleasant City Family Reunion Committee was established in 1993 and founded by Everee Jimerson Clarke to sponsor the first Pleasant City Community Reunion in conjunction with the West Palm Beach Centennial Celebration in 1994. Former residents, who had property and close ties to the area had been away more than 30 years found that life in Pleasant City had changed. Many residents became discouraged and moved away to seek opportunities elsewhere.

== The Heritage Gallery ==
The Heritage Gallery was opened September 21, 1996 at 2315 N. Dixie Highway to create a lasting memorial to the Pioneers of Pleasant City. It was a reflection of the heritage, lifestyles, and interest of the Pioneers. It maintains a library of historic documents, oral histories, artifacts, photographs, art, and memorabilia available to the general public. The Heritage Gallery aims to serve as a resource center for most of the African American Historic projects in Palm Beach County since 1996.

The Heritage Gallery trains youth and sponsors historic events including The Living Legends of Negro Baseball, The Triple Nickles, Buffalo Soldiers, National Designers, Artists and honoring deserving Achievers.

Heritage Gallery Programs includes: Heritage Gallery Tours, History Study Groups, Jazz Preservation Society, Inter-generational Society, Eleganté International Teen Club, Computer Lab, Camp Heritage Trail, Special Events, Pioneer Days, Ms. Senior Queen Pageant, Father’s Day-Mother’s Day, Youth in Business, Youth Performing Arts, and Community Resource Center

== Redevelopment ==
Merry Place is an affordable housing project developed by the West Palm Beach Housing Authority (WPBHA) in Pleasant City. The WPBHA built a 128 affordable apartment complex on part of the available land in 2007. In 2018, Pulte Homes announced plans to build 36 affordable townhouses adjacent to the Merry Place Apartments in partnership with the WPBHA. The WPBHA also holds vacant land at Merry Place with room for 52 condominiums.

== Business ==
The oldest business in Pleasant City is Bush Brothers Provision Company. Built in depression stricken 1925 using local day laborers to share the work, it is still operating in the same building owned by the same family.

== Bibliography ==
- Clarke, Everee Jimerson (2005). Pleasant City: West Palm Beach. Black American series. Great Britain: Arcadia Publishing ISBN 0-7385-1758-5.
