= Jupiter and Lake Worth Railway =

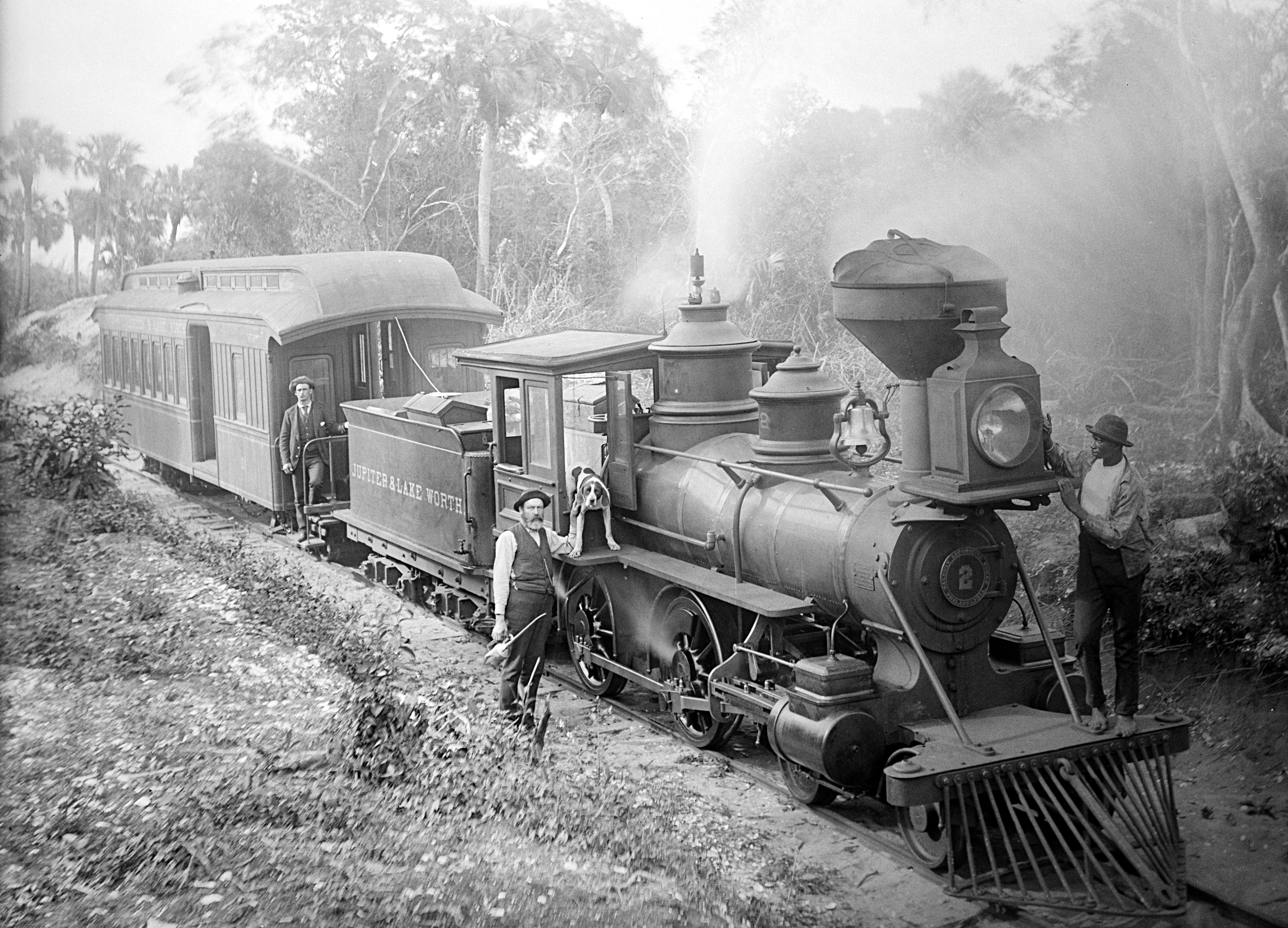
- Jupiter and Lake Worth RR, 1897

Overview
- Locale: Northeastern Palm Beach County
- Termini: Juno (Note: Juno should not be confused with the present-day town of Juno Beach, Florida. The former was abandoned following a massive fire in 1907, while the latter was incorporated just north of the former site of Juno in 1953.); Jupiter
- Stations: 4

Technical
- Track gauge: 3 ft (914 mm)

The Jupiter and Lake Worth Railway was a 3 feet (0.91 m) narrow gauge railway with a 7.5 miles (12.1 km) connection between the Jacksonville, Tampa and Key West Railway system in Florida. It connected the Lake Worth Lagoon at Juno to the Jupiter Inlet at Jupiter. With intermediate stops at Venus and Mars, the railroad was often called the Celestial Railroad, with the first use of that name appearing in the March 1893 issue of Harper's New Monthly Magazine in an article written by Julian Ralph. A report published by the town of Jupiter in 2012 noted that Mars and Venus "were not much more than loading platforms."

The purpose of the railroad was to link the Lake Worth and Jupiter inlets, both of which had Plant System steamboat lines. The Indian River Steamboat Company went north through the Jupiter Inlet and connected waterways (now part of the Intracoastal Waterway) to Titusville. There were no turning tracks, so the locomotives always pointed towards Juno, forcing trains making the return trip to go in reverse. Fare was rather high for the time, being 10 cents per mile (6.2 ¢/km), a maximum total of 75 cents. Those who rode on the Jupiter and Lake Worth Railway recalled that the conductor would occasionally stop the train to allow passengers to pick flowers or hunt wild turkeys.

Henry Flagler, the owner of the Florida East Coast Railway, rejected the high price, instead building his own line to the west. The new railroad was finished in February 1894, and the Jupiter and Lake Worth Railway was gone by June 1896.

Eventually, a canal was dug between the two waterways that the railroad connected; this is now part of the Intracoastal Waterway.

Part of the right-of-way was used for the current alignment of U.S. 1 (SR 5), built in 1956; the rest was abandoned and has been mostly redeveloped.
