= Juno, Florida =

Town in Palm Beach County, Florida, USA

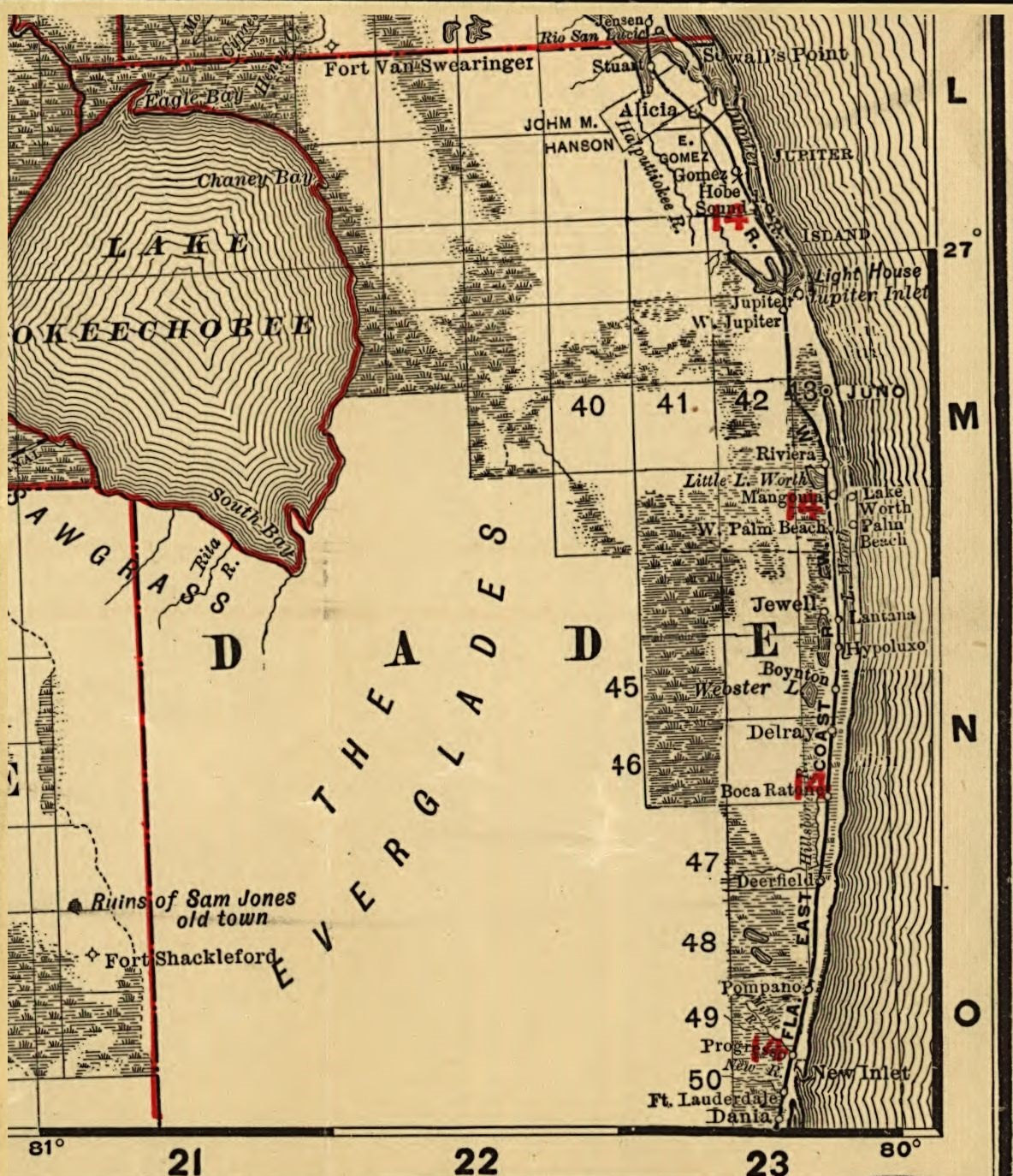
1900 indexed county and township pocket map showing Dade County

Juno was a town in Palm Beach County, Florida. Settlement in Juno dated back to at least early 1889, when residents of Dade County, which then stretched from modern-day Martin County to Miami-Dade County, voted for the area to become the county seat. Located at the north end of the Lake Worth Lagoon, Juno soon became the southern terminus of the Jupiter and Lake Worth Railway, which is often referred to as the Celestial Railroad due to its stations at Juno, Mars, Venus, and Jupiter. Juno's status as the seat of Dade County attracted people and businesses to the town, including The Tropical Sun, which became the first newspaper in South Florida.

Described as a small but thriving town in its first few years, growth in the community did not last after Henry Flagler refused to purchase the Jupiter and Lake Worth Railway in the mid-1890s while extending his Florida East Coast Railway (FEC) southward, bypassing Juno. The FEC not only drove the Jupiter and Lake Worth Railway out of business but also shifted economic and population increases to the fledgling communities of Palm Beach and West Palm Beach. Additionally, the Dade County seat returned to Miami in 1899. Juno effectively became abandoned following a 1907 fire that destroyed many buildings and the former townsite is now partially located in present-day North Palm Beach and Palm Beach Gardens.

== History ==
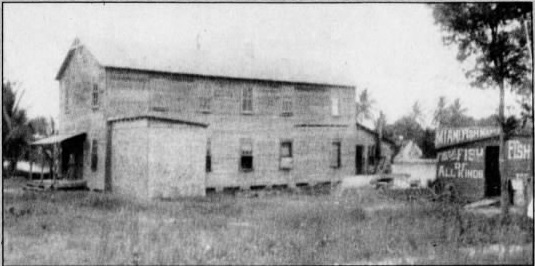
The Dade County Courthouse at Juno, completed in the summer of 1890

By 1888, people residing in the Lake Worth Lagoon region, including local politicians such as Elisha Newton Dimick, Alan E. Heyser, George W. Lainhart, and George W. Potter, began petitioning to move the county seat to the area from the settlements along Biscayne Bay. With a larger population than the Biscayne Bay Country communities, residents of the Lake Worth Lagoon region won the special election in February 1889 to move the county seat. Dade County covered a vast section of southeast Florida at the time, including modern-day Miami-Dade, Broward, Palm Beach, Martin, and parts of Okeechobee counties, but a small population of 995 people and just 224 dwellings according to the 1890 census. While many people in the Biscayne Bay Country accepted the results, others threatened violence, causing the Lake Worth Lagoon delegation who arrived to retrieve county records to canoe through the Everglades overnight up to the New River. Juno, then unnamed, likely became the county seat due to its location at the northern terminus of the Lake Worth Transportation Company steamship line. Sometime between March 1889 and January 1890, residents selected the name Juno, the wife of the Roman god Jupiter.

Newly-elected Dade County clerk A. F. Quimby stored the public records at the home of county commissioner Albert M. Fields until a courthouse could be constructed. Fields agreed to donate 1 acre (0.40 ha) of land for the courthouse, which was located near where the Oakbrook Square shopping center stands today. C. C. Haight received the contract to build the courthouse at a cost of $1,495. Upon opening in the summer of 1890, the courthouse building featured offices for county clerk, judge, and sheriff on the first floor and a full-sized courtroom on the second floor, which could be repurposed for social functions such as dances or church or fraternal organization meetings. The county constructed a jailhouse nearby in 1892, spending about $350 on the building but another $850 for jail cells made of iron.

In 1891, Guy Metcalf moved the Indian River News to Juno from Melbourne and renamed the publication The Tropical Sun, which became the first newspaper in South Florida. Martin County historians Greg and Alice L. Luckhardt described Juno as including "a post office, train station, saloon, hotel, Guy Metcalf's Tropical Sun newspaper, lawyer Charles C. Chillingworth's office located in the new courthouse, and abundant pineapple fields." Chillingworth recalled in 1932 that Juno featured "at various times about seven dwelling houses, two boarding houses, one newspaper building and one very small railroad station and a small store building on the dock near the water's edge." and did not have any banks, churches, medical practices, or schools, until a small one-room schoolhouse opened near the end of its time as the county seat.

Construction of Henry Flagler's Royal Poinciana Hotel in Palm Beach began on May 1, 1893. Residents of Juno assumed that Flagler would purchase the Jupiter and Lake Worth Railway to avoid the flatwoods area to the west, which frequently flooded. Flagler indeed attempted to buy the railroad, but the high price compelled him to decide to continue his Florida East Coast Railway through the flatwoods. In The Florida Historical Quarterly, Nathan D. Shappee described Flagler spurning Juno as "a blow from which the county seat and the Celestial Railroad never recovered." Metcalf moved The Tropical Sun to West Palm Beach in January 1895.

Juno's jailhouse briefly held Sam Lewis, who shot and killed three people in Lemon City in 1895, including Rhett McGregor, considered the first law enforcement officer in Dade County to be murdered while on duty. A posse arrived at the jailhouse on August 17 to abduct Lewis. Although they successfully removed Lewis, the scuffle led to the death of the jailer. Thereafter, the mob hanged Lewis from a telephone pole, an incident considered the first lynching in South Florida. The 1896-1897 edition of the Business Directory, Guide and History of Dade County, Fla. estimated that approximately 100 people lived in Juno and predicted that the community would unlikely ever be more than a farming town with a post office. By March 1899, 500 registered voters in Dade County signed a petition for another county seat referendum, scheduled to occur on May 10. The referendum led to the county seat being relocated to Miami, lessening interest in Juno even further. Juno had been mostly abandoned by 1907. A forest fire on April 12 of that year burned down all remaining buildings and dwellings, most of which were unoccupied.

== Legacy ==
Former residents and local pioneers erected a monument in the 1930s where the southern terminus of the Jupiter and Lake Worth Railway once stood upon request by Chillingworth, by then a county judge. Several years later, vandals defaced the monument and machinery later damaged it during a re-surfacing of U.S. Route 1. Today, a marker stands in Palm Beach Gardens along U.S. Route 1 just north of Florida State Road 786 (PGA Boulevard), which notes that the Daughters of the American Revolution's (DAR) Seminole chapter first constructed it in 1938.

The present-day town of Juno Beach, incorporated in 1953, is located a few miles north of the former community of Juno. Juno Ridge, a census-designated place, is located near the DAR's historical marker. According to the Historical Society of Palm Beach County, a brick cistern has been preserved inside modern-day North Palm Beach's Twelve Oaks subdivision, where the town dock once stood.

== Notable resident ==
Ivy Julia Cromartie Stranahan, a philanthropist and advocate for the Seminole tribe, noted in an autobiography that she and her family lived in Juno for several years during her childhood, before moving to Lemon City by 1899.

== See also ==
- List of ghost towns in Florida
