= Melani =

Melani may refer to:

== Female ==
- Melani Bergés Gámez (born 1990), Spanish blind Paralympic sprinter
- Melani Budianta (born 1954), Indonesian scholar of feminism, postcolonialism, and multiculturalism
- Melani Cammett (born 1969), American political scientist and professor
- Melani Costa (born 1989), Spanish Olympic swimmer
- Melani García (born 2007), Spanish singer
- Melani Leimena Suharli (born 1951), Indonesian politician
- Melani Olivares (born 1973), Spanish actress
- Melani Putri (born 2000), Indonesian Olympic rower
- Melani Sanders (born 1980), American content creator and social media influencer

== Male ==
- Melani Matavao (born 1995), Samoan professional rugby union player
- Melani Nanai (born 1993), Samoan rugby union player

== Male ==
- Alessandro Melani (1639–1703), Italian composer
- Atto Melani (1626–1714), Italian castrato singer, diplomat, spy, and writer
- Giuseppe Melani (1673–1747), Italian painter
- Jacopo Melani (1623–1676), Italian composer and organist
- Klodian Melani (born 1986), Albanian footballer
- Marcelo Angiolo Melani (1938–2021), Argentine Roman Catholic bishop
- Stath Melani (1858–1917), Albanian Orthodox priest

== See also ==
- Stadio Marcello Melani, Pistoia, Italy
