= Mandel Public Library of West Palm Beach =

Library in Florida, United States

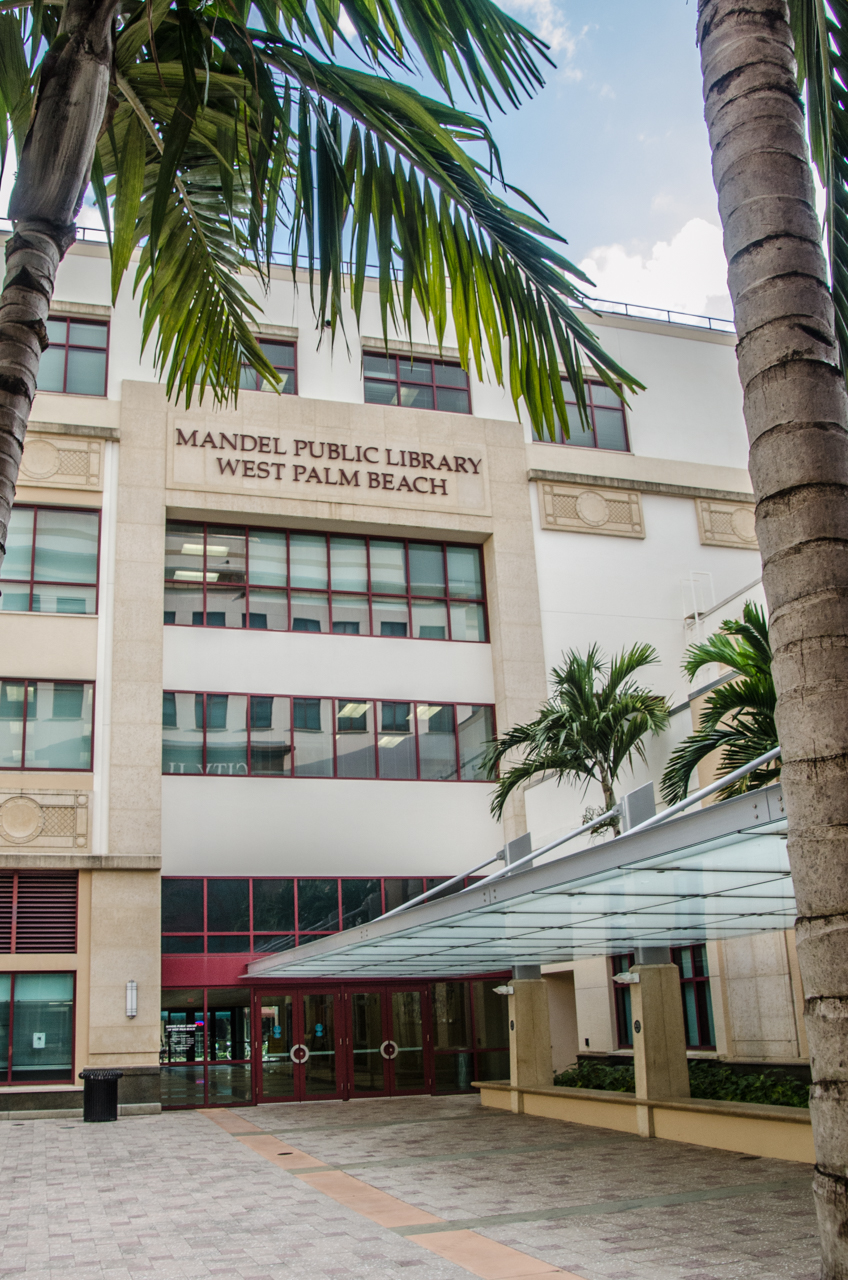
- 26.713740462948767°N 80.05383285882984°W
- Location: West Palm Beach, Florida
- Type: Public library
- Established: 1895

Collection
- Size: 218,887 items

Access and use
- Circulation: 803,608
- Population served: 104,323

Other information
- Budget: $4,075,654
- Director: Lisa Hathaway
- Employees: 47 FTEs
- Website: wpbcitylibrary.org

The Mandel Public Library of West Palm Beach (formerly the West Palm Beach Public Library) is the public library of the City of West Palm Beach, Florida.

In April 2009, the library relocated into a new facility in City Center in the heart of downtown West Palm Beach, which is 2.5 times larger than the previous building. In the 2015 fiscal year (October 1, 2014 – September 30, 2015) the Library circulated 803,608 items to 106,664 registered card holders. During that same year, the library had 551,674 visitors.

== History ==
The Mandel Public Library of West Palm Beach is the oldest public library in Palm Beach County, Florida. The Library first began as a Free Reading Room for the City of West Palm Beach. The Free Reading Room was located in the city’s first church, the Union Congregational Church on the corner of Datura and Olive Streets. The reading room began in 1895 when Reverend Asbury Caldwell began collecting books for a reading club. Caldwell hoped the reading club would keep construction workers out of the city’s many drinking establishments located along First Street, or “Thirst Street” as it was also known. The reading club floundered when Caldwell left West Palm Beach. In 1899, the library got its official start, housed in a two-story former Palm Beach Yacht Club building donated by Commodore Charles John Clarke, a Palm Beach yachtsman, along with the collection of books from the Reading Room and a $100 donation from Henry Flagler.

On January 26, 1924, the City's first permanent library, an artistic Spanish style building, which was dedicated to the men and women who served in World War I, opened alongside the Women's Club and a band shell in Flagler Park, facing the Intracoastal Waterway. Approximately 7,000 volumes were moved to the new library, and the collection doubled in size shortly after that, much in thanks to $10,000 bequest from the estate of Marie Brown. In spite of severe damage from the 1928 Okeechobee hurricane which left more than half of the books destroyed and two feet of lake water and mud on the floor, the Memorial Library remained open, serving the residents of West Palm Beach until spring 1962.

On April 30, 1962, a new city library designed by architect Norman Robson, was dedicated and opened with much flourish and public comment over its modern, colorful, exterior frieze panels. The name of the library at 100 Clematis Street was changed to the West Palm Beach Public Library. It was planned to allow for expansion for at least twenty years.

On February 21, 2012, the Mandel Foundation awarded a $5 million grant to the West Palm Beach Library Foundation for the enhancement of library programs and services. At this time, the West Palm Beach Public Library was renamed the Mandel Public Library of West Palm Beach.

In 2022, the library was named by Fodor's Travel as among the 11 most beautiful libraries in the country.

== Facilities ==
On April 13, 2009, the Library opened in its present facility at 411 Clematis Street in downtown West Palm Beach. The four-story library is two and one-half times the size of the previous building.

The first floor contains 50 categories of new books, audio books, periodicals, a Book Sale, New and Popular DVDs and Blu-ray discs, and the Salento coffee shop. Wi-Fi is available to the public, free of charge, throughout the library and City Center.

The second floor, which includes both the Technology and TeenSource areas, has 18 PCs in the common area, a teen section with another 18 PCs, and a teen collection made up of books, graphic novels, and video games. Also on this floor are music CDs, DVDs and Blu-ray movies. Four small study rooms are available for individual use, and computer training and career services are available in the 12-seat computer lab. In 2019 the library opened a comprehensive studio space for creatives on its second floor, named Studio 411, to support its popular and growing range of arts programs. In 2022, the West Palm Beach Library Foundation received a donation to rename the existing Digital Studios to the Technology and Innovation Center which offers access to services such as, 3D printing, laser cutting, audio and video recording, photo and film digitization, digital art and animation, and virtual reality.

KidSpace, which includes interactive spaces, 24 Internet PCs plus 5 early literacy PCs, a Homework Center, a parenting collection with comfortable adult seating close to the toddler area, and many books, DVDs, Blu-ray discs, magazines, and CDs, is on the third floor.

The meeting room suite, also on the third floor, has a 150-seat auditorium with theatrical lighting and a projection and sound system that can accommodate movies, theatrical productions and live music events. It also contains a 50-seat meeting room, a large conference room that holds 16 and a small conference room that holds 8. The two larger meeting rooms are equipped for audio-visual demonstrations. These rooms are available to the public for meetings or other types of gatherings when not in use for library programs.

The fourth floor is the Grand Reading Room, which is 270 feet (82 m) long with a 35-foot (11 m) high barrel-shaped ceiling. It contains the library's adult book collection, reading tables equipped with power outlets, 50 public PCs, the historical Florida Room, and two group study rooms.

In November 2020, The Institute of Museum and Library Services (IMLS)CARES Act funded the Mandel Public Library of West Palm Beach with a grant to begin offering new services for the community. This will include things like mobile hotspots around the city and areas children can go for "Homework Help". Implementation of these services began in 2021 and continues today.

== Digital collections ==
The Mandel Public Library of West Palm Beach offers access to movies, music, ebooks and audiobooks and more through various platforms including CloudLibrary, Hoopla, Kanopy, The Palace Project, and Project Gutenberg for smartphones, tablets, e-readers, and computers.

== Events and activities ==
The Mandel Public Library of West Palm Beach provides programs, classes, lectures, interactive experiences, training, and workshop opportunities. Each month, the library hosts a book club for adults, two for children (and a quarterly family book club), a variety of computer training classes, bilingual events and outreach to the Hispanic community, crafts activities, dance lessons, tai chi, yoga, expert talks on health, aging, and finances, and various other popular programs. The library also enjoys numerous community partnerships which enhance the library's wide variety of activities. Among the numerous and varied children's and teen events are the "Dog Tales" with specially trained therapy dogs that will "listen" to a child reading and gaming and animation workshops. The "Let's Read" program provides specially trained volunteers to read stories to pre-kindergarten through grade 2 children in four local, Title 1 schools.

The Teens' and Children's Homework Centers are each staffed daily by two certified teachers.

== Library Foundation ==
The West Palm Beach Library Foundation, a 501(c)(3) organization and independent from the City of West Palm Beach, was formed in the year 2000 with the original mission of working collaboratively with the City of West Palm Beach in a private-public partnership to build a new library. The Foundation, free of any political process or influence, secures financial and in-kind donations to enhance programs, services, collections and technology that the city's operating budget cannot encompass.

In 2009, the Foundation renewed its commitment to elevate the library's programs, services, technology, and collections. It collaborates closely with the Mandel Public Library, strategically directing resources where they can have the most substantial impact. While public funds sustain the library's basic operations, the Foundation's role becomes critical in expanding access to information, enhancing programs, and providing services that align with the community's diverse needs.

Through a strong partnership with the Mandel Public Library, the West Palm Beach Library Foundation determines where support will have the greatest impact. While public or taxpayer dollars provide for the Library's basic operating budget, they are not sufficient to provide full access to the information, programs and services which members of the community need and value. The Foundation's support is necessary to help the Library improve its technology, collections, services and programs.

== See also ==
- Palm Beach County Library System
