= Tanger Outlets Palm Beach =

- Location: West Palm Beach, Florida, U.S.
- Coordinates: 26.72430°N 80.08823°W
- Address: 1801 Palm Beach Lakes Boulevard
- Opened: October 26, 1967 (Mall); February 14, 2014 (Outlets)
- Closed: 2010 (Mall)
- Developer: Edward J. DeBartolo Corporation (Mall); New England Development (Outlets)
- Manager: Tanger Inc.
- Owner: Tanger Inc.
- Num. of stores: 140
- Floor area: 1,085,000 square feet (0.1008 km^{2})
- Floors: 1
- Parking: Parking lot
- Website: palmbeachoutlets.com

Tanger Outlets Palm Beach is a 440,000 sq ft (41,000 m^{2}) outlet shopping center in West Palm Beach, Florida. Opened on February 14, 2014, it was developed on the site of the former Palm Beach Mall. Palm Beach Outlets features over 130 stores and restaurants including Saks Fifth Avenue OFF 5TH, Ann Taylor, Banana Republic, Brooks Brothers, J.Crew, Nike, Tommy Hilfiger, Under Armour, and Vera Bradley. The center’s former ownership (led by Clarion) entered into a venture with Tanger Outlets (NYSE: SKT) as of July 29, 2022 which provided for Tanger to replace New England Development to become the property’s manager and owner.

Tanger Outlets Palm Beach is located directly off Interstate 95 on Palm Beach Lakes Boulevard in West Palm Beach, Florida. The site also includes Marketplace at the Outlets, a 300,000 square foot regional center that features approximately 20 stores, including Burlington, DSW Shoe Warehouse, Nordstrom Rack, Old Navy, PetSmart, T.J. Maxx, Ulta Beauty, Homegoods and Whole Foods Market.

== History ==
=== Palm Beach Mall early years ===
The Wonderfall fountain in the mall's center court with Jordan Marsh seen on the left (circa late 1960s)

When the mall originally opened on October 26, 1967, it was touted by its developer, the Edward J. DeBartolo Corporation, as the largest mall in the Southeastern United States. The founding anchors included JCPenney, which moved from its historic store downtown on Clematis Street about three miles (5 km) southeast, Jordan Marsh and Richards. By the end of the decade, the mall also featured Walgreens, Lerner Shops, Food Fair, Woolworth, and The Mall Cinema 1-2-3-4 quadraplex.

The Palm Beach Mall was expanded and renovated in 1980, in conjunction with the addition of Burdines (which relocated from its Downtown West Palm Beach location) sporting a parking garage and Lord & Taylor. Also in 1980 Sears moved into the space previously occupied by Richards, which had closed the same year following a statewide liquidation. The shopping mall's terrazzo floor was replaced with tiles at this time.

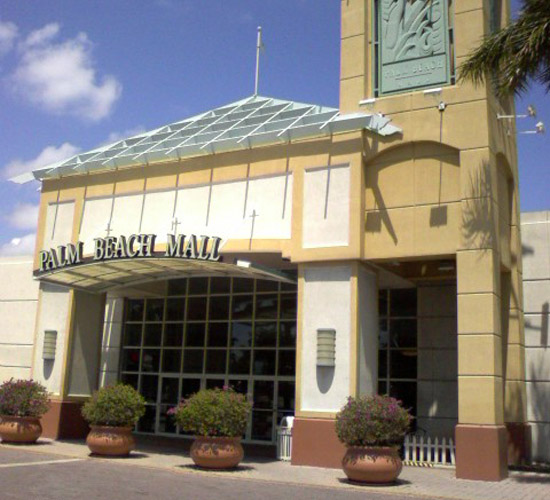
The former mall's main entrance

Furthermore, when Pantry Pride (formerly Food Fair) closed in 1987, a food court called Treats was developed from its space. Design features popular in the 1980s, including skylights and a lofty ceiling, were introduced to the Mall at this time.

The 2000 renovation replaced most of the mall's interior fixtures, redesigned the food court (this time calling it "Sea Side Café), and replaced the Wonderfall in center court with a much more modern fountain sporting a seahorse theme.

=== Closure and redevelopment ===
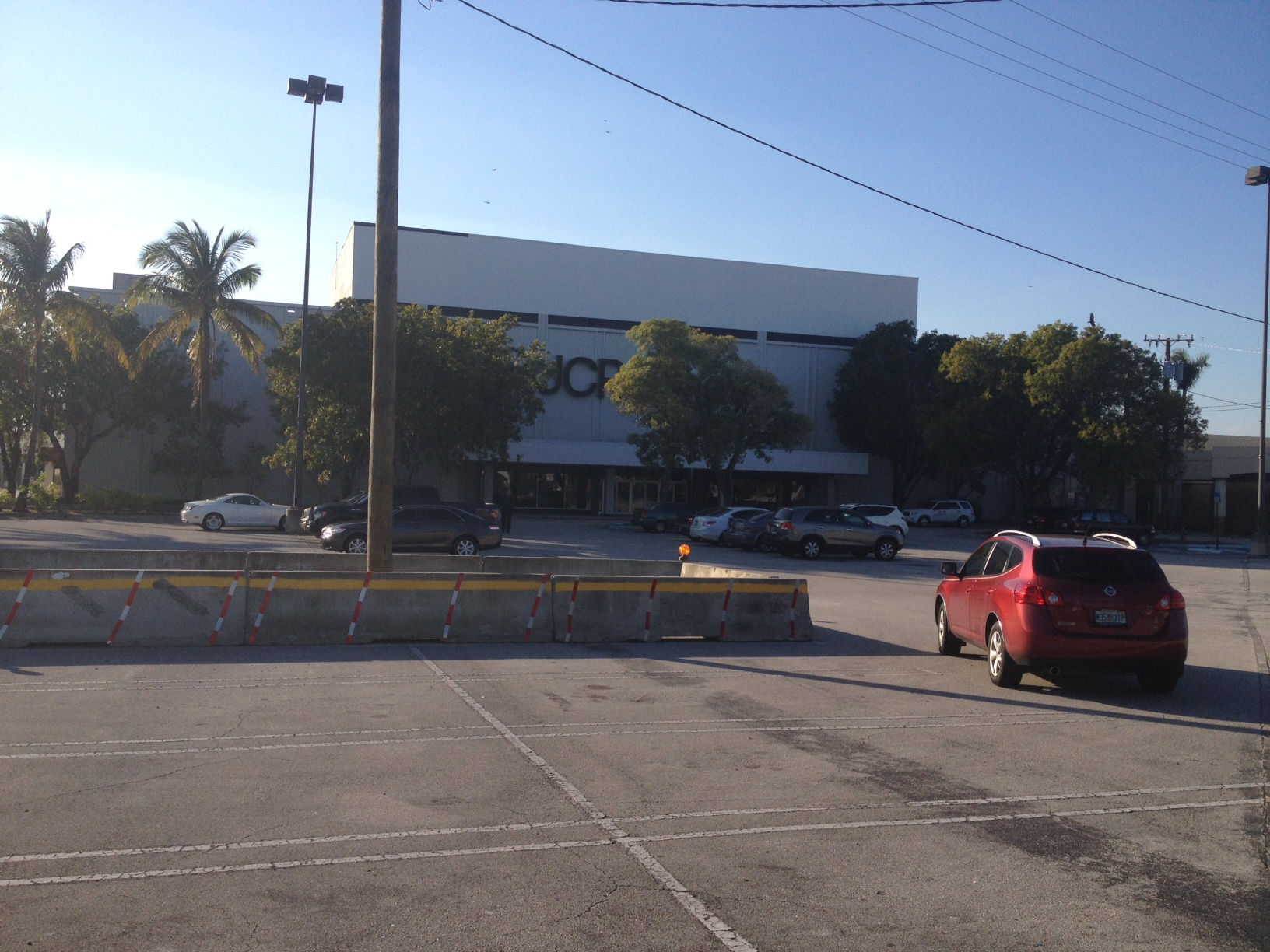
JCPenney in 2013, prior to closure

On December 5, 2009, the mall's court-appointed receiver announced that the Palm Beach Mall would officially close on January 31, 2010, with the exception of JCPenney, George's Music and Firestone, which have outdoor entrances. Upon foreclosure under Simon ownership, Orix seized ownership of the Mall in December 2009, and along with the City of West Palm Beach, was looking into luring IKEA and Bass Pro Shops to occupy the site, but it never happened. The mall was eventually acquired by New England Development transforming the Palm Beach Mall into Palm Beach Outlets, an open-air outlet mall beside a strip of big box stores. The mall was developed on the 80-acre property by New England Development, Eastern Real Estate and Lubert-Adler. It was announced in February 2013 that Whole Foods Market would open in its own facility towards the southwest end of the mall property, next to the Palm Beach Lakes/I-95 interchange.

George's Music relocated to nearby Rivera Beach, closing their mall location on June 30, 2012, originally intending to return with the opening of Palm Beach Outlets, however, this never happened. JCPenney and Firestone were planned to be included in the Palm Beach Outlets with their original buildings, but due to company downsizing, closed the location on May 1, 2013.

Palm Beach Outlets opened on February 14, 2014. The mall includes a Saks Fifth Avenue Off Fifth outlet store as an anchor. Sports Authority closed in 2016 as result of bankruptcy which divided into HomeGoods and Five Below, in May 2020 Pier 1 Imports would close all stores including this location as it filed for Chapter 11 Bankruptcy back on February 17, 2020, Marshalls will replace Pier 1 and open in April 2022. in April 2023, Bed Bath & Beyond filed for Chapter 11 Bankruptcy and would liquidate all of it stores including this location, The store closed in the end of July.
