= West Palm Beach, Florida =

City in southeast Florida, United States

- City
- West Palm Beach skyline from the Intracoastal Waterway

- Seal Logo
- Nicknames: Orchid City, West Palm, WPB
- Location in Palm Beach County and the state of Florida
- Coordinates: 26°44′49″N 80°07′52″W
- Country: United States
- State: Florida
- County: Palm Beach
- Settled (Lake Worth Country Settlement): c. 1884
- Platted (West Palm Beach Settlement): 1893
- Incorporated (Town of West Palm Beach): November 5, 1894
- Incorporated (City of West Palm Beach): July 21, 1903
- Named for: Location west of Palm Beach

Government
  - Type: Mayor–commission
  - Mayor: Keith A. James (D)
  - Commission president: Joseph Peduzzi
  - Commissioners: Cathleen Ward; Shalonda Warren; Christy Fox; Joseph Peduzzi; Stephen Sylvester
  - City administrator: Faye W. Johnson
  - City clerk: Shaquita Edwards

Area
  - Total: 57.98 sq mi (150.18 km^{2})
  - Land: 53.82 sq mi (139.39 km^{2})
  - Water: 4.17 sq mi (10.79 km^{2})
- Elevation: 16 ft (4.9 m)

Population (2020)
  - Total: 117,415
  - Estimate (2022): 120,932
  - Rank: 239th in the United States; 17th in Florida
  - Density: 2,247.0/sq mi (867.58/km^{2})
- Time zone: UTC-5 (EST)
  - Summer (DST): UTC-4 (EDT)
- ZIP Codes: 33401–33422
- Area codes: 561 and 728
- FIPS code: 12-76600
- GNIS feature ID: 2405713
- Website: wpb.org

West Palm Beach (WPB) is a city in and the county seat of Palm Beach County, Florida, United States. It is located immediately to the west of the adjacent Palm Beach, which is situated on a barrier island across the Lake Worth Lagoon.

It is the largest city in Palm Beach County, and at the time of the 2020 census, its population was 117,415. West Palm Beach is a principal city of the Miami metropolitan area, which was home to 6.14 million people in 2020. It is the oldest incorporated municipality in the South Florida area, incorporated as a city two years before Miami in November 1894. West Palm Beach is located approximately 68 miles (109 km) north of Downtown Miami.

== History ==
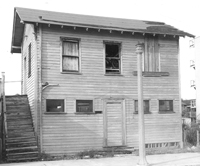
Old city hall and jail

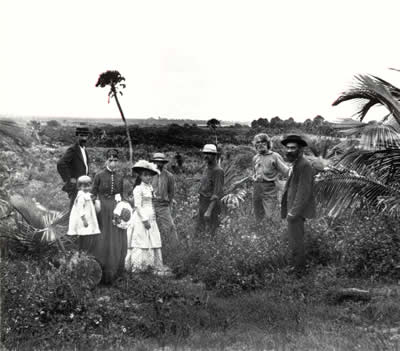
West Palm Beach in the 1880s

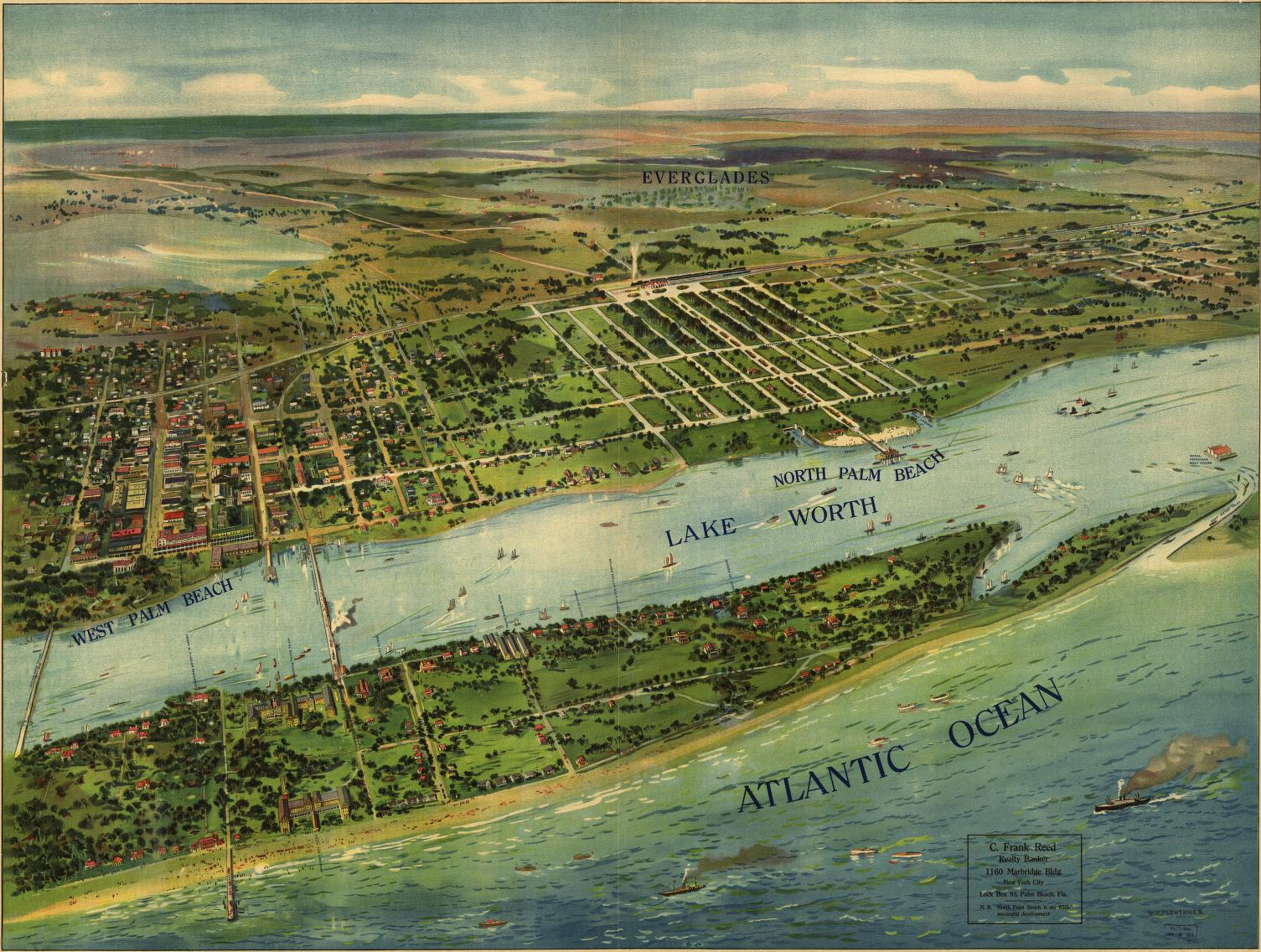
Panoramic view of West Palm Beach, North Palm Beach and Lake Worth, 1915

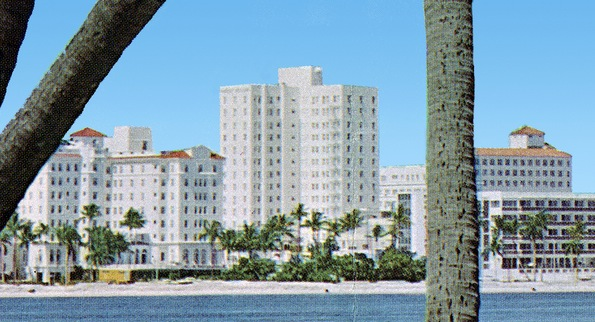
West Palm Beach in the 1960s

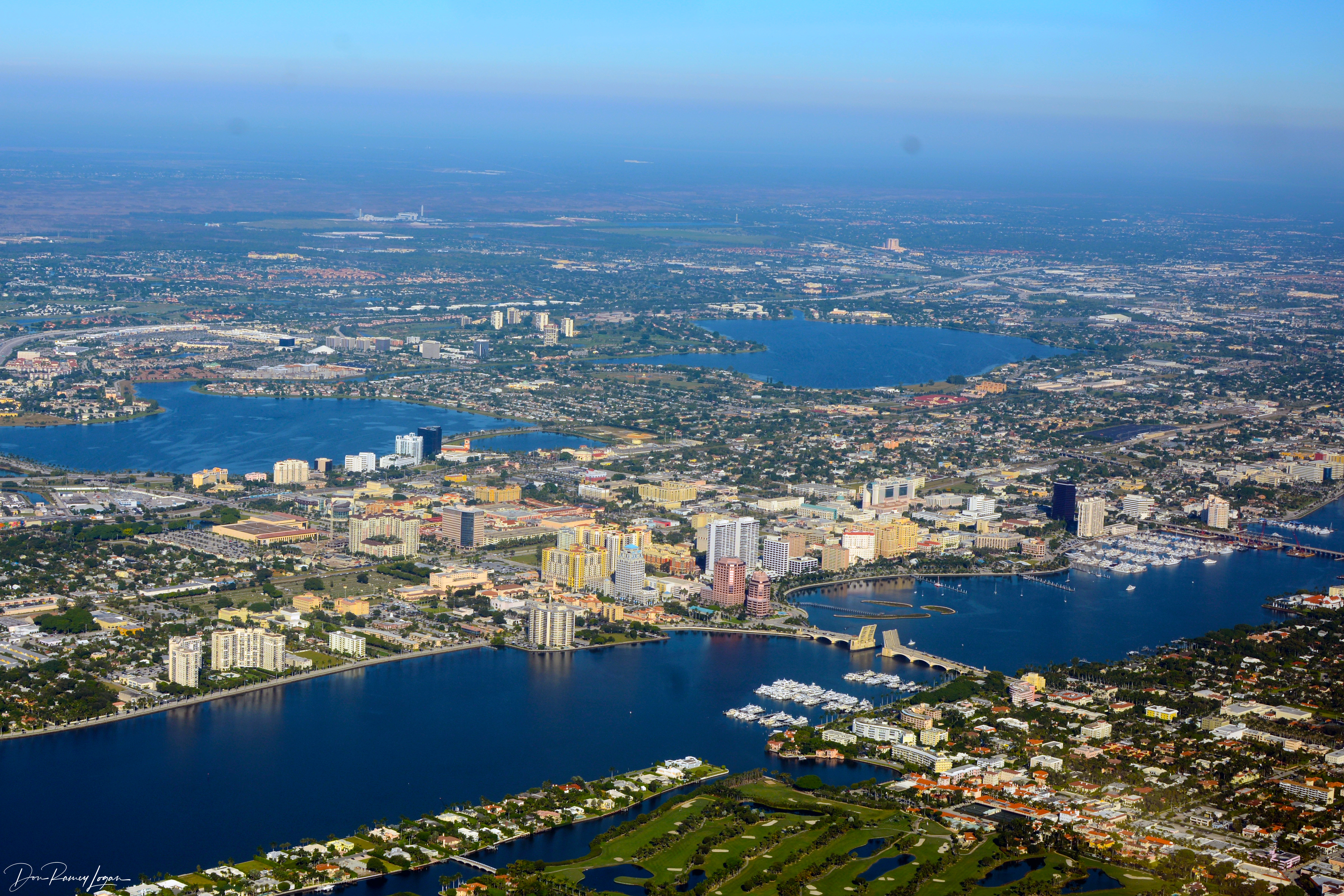
Aerial view

West Palm Beach skyline in 2010

Wide panorama of skyline

The area that became West Palm Beach was settled in the late 1870s and 1880s by a few hundred settlers who called the vicinity Lake Worth Country. These settlers were a diverse community from different parts of the United States and the rest of the world. They included founding families such as the Potters and the Lainharts, who later became leading members of the business community in the fledgling city. The first white settlers in Palm Beach County lived around Lake Worth, which was then an enclosed freshwater lake, named after Colonel William Jenkins Worth, who fought in the Second Seminole War in Florida in 1842. Most settlers engaged in the growing of tropical fruits and vegetables for shipment to the north via Lake Worth and the Indian River. By 1890, the U.S. Census counted over 200 people settled along Lake Worth in the vicinity of what later became West Palm Beach. The area at this time also boasted a hotel, the "Cocoanut House", a church, and a post office. The city was platted by Henry Flagler as a community to house the servants working in the two grand hotels on the neighboring island of Palm Beach, across Lake Worth in 1893, coinciding with the arrival of the Florida East Coast railroad. Flagler paid two area settlers, Captain Porter and Louie Hillhouse, a combined sum of $45,000 for the original town's site, stretching from Clear Lake to Lake Worth.

The city was incorporated on November 5, 1894. This made West Palm Beach the first incorporated municipality in Dade County and in South Florida. The town council quickly addressed the building codes, and the tents and shanties were replaced by brick, brick veneer, and stone buildings. The city grew steadily during the 1890s and the first two decades of the 20th century; most residents were engaged in the tourist industry and related services or winter vegetable market and tropical fruit trade. In 1909, the Florida legislature formed Palm Beach County and West Palm Beach became its county seat. In 1916, a new neoclassical courthouse was opened. It has been painstakingly restored to its original condition and is now a local history museum.

The city grew rapidly as part of the 1920s Florida land boom. The population of West Palm Beach quadrupled from 1920 to 1927, and all kinds of businesses and public services grew along with it. Many landmark structures and preserved neighborhoods were constructed during this period. Originally, Flagler intended his Florida East Coast Railway to have its terminus in West Palm, but after the area experienced a deep freeze, he chose to extend the railroad to Miami instead.

The land boom was already faltering when the city was devastated by the 1928 Okeechobee hurricane. The Depression years of the 1930s were a quiet time for the area, which saw slight population growth and property values lower than during the 1920s. The city only recovered with the onset of World War II, which saw the construction of Palm Beach Air Force Base, which brought thousands of military personnel to the city. The base was vital to the allied war effort, as it provided an excellent training facility and had unparalleled access to North Africa for a North American city. Also during World War II, German U-boats sank two dozen merchant ships and oil tankers off the coast of West Palm Beach. Nearby Palm Beach was under blackout conditions to minimize night visibility to German U-boats.

The 1950s saw another boom in population, partly due to the return of many soldiers and airmen who served nearby during the war. Also, the advent of air conditioning encouraged growth, as year-round living in a tropical climate became more acceptable to northerners. West Palm Beach became one of the nation's fastest-growing metropolitan areas during the 1950s; the city's borders spread west of Military Trail and south to Lake Clarke Shores. However, many city residents still lived in a narrow six-block wide strip from the south to north end. The neighborhoods were strictly segregated between White and African-American populations, a legacy that the city still struggles with today. The primary shopping district remained downtown, centered around Clematis Street.

In the 1967s, Palm Beach County's first enclosed shopping mall, the Palm Beach Mall, and an indoor arena were completed. These projects led to a brief revival for the city, but in the 1970s and 1980s crime continued to be a serious issue and suburban sprawl continued to drain resources and business away from the old downtown area. By the early 1990s there were very high vacancy rates downtown, and serious levels of urban blight.

The 2008 financial crisis hit the region particularly hard, and some neighborhoods are still struggling. Developments such as CityPlace and the preservation and renovation of 1920s architecture in the nightlife hub of Clematis Street have seen a downtown resurgence in the entertainment and shopping district. The city has also placed emphasis on neighborhood development and revitalization in historic districts such as Northwood, Flamingo Park, and El Cid. The Palm Beach Mall was again redeveloped into the Palm Beach Fashion Outlets in February 2014. The West Palm Beach station for Brightline, a high speed passenger rail service serving Miami, Fort Lauderdale, and West Palm Beach, was opened in 2018.

=== Timeline ===
Timeline of West Palm Beach, Florida
- 1893
  - "Town platted on Lake Worth."
  - Florida East Coast Railway begins operating.
- 1894
  - West Palm Beach incorporated.
  - John S. Earman becomes mayor.
- 1896 – Fire.
- 1900 – Population: 564.
- 1903 – "City of West Palm Beach" established.
- 1905 – Population: 1,280.
- 1907 – Flagler Park established.
- 1908 – Palm Beach Post newspaper begins publication.
- 1909 – West Palm Beach designated seat of newly created Palm Beach County.
- 1912 – Palm Beach County Fair begins.
- 1916 – County courthouse constructed.
- 1917 – Beaux Arts Theatre in business.
- 1919
  - Office of city manager created.
  - City Hall built.
- 1923 – Kettler Theatre in business.
- 1924 – Public Library building opens.
- 1925 – Seaboard Air Line Railway begins operating; West Palm Beach station opens.
- 1926
  - West Palm Beach Canal (to Lake Okeechobee) constructed.
  - September: 1926 Miami hurricane occurs.
- 1928 – September: 1928 Okeechobee hurricane occurs.
- 1930 – Population: 26,610.
- 1933 – Palm Beach Junior College opens.
- 1936
  - Morrison Field (airport) begins operating.
  - WJNO radio begins broadcasting.
- 1937 – Historical Society of Palm Beach County founded.
- 1941 – Norton Museum of Art established.
- 1942
  - April 17: City gets "8.35 inches of rain in just two hours."
  - U.S. military Palm Beach Air Force Base begins operating near West Palm Beach.
- 1947 – WIRK radio begins broadcasting.
- 1948
  - Palm Beach International Airport active.
  - WEAT radio begins broadcasting.
- 1951 – Beach Drive-In cinema in business.
- 1954 – WPTV (television) begins broadcasting.
- 1955 – WEAT-TV (television) begins broadcasting.
- 1961 – Cardinal Newman High School established.
- 1962 – West Palm Beach Municipal Stadium opens.
- 1964 – Palm Beach County Genealogical Society formed.
- 1967 – Palm Beach County Library System established.
- 1967 – Palm Beach Mall opens.
- 1967 – West Palm Beach Auditorium opens (capacity: 5,000). It would later be sold in 1998 to the Watchtower Bible and Tract Society, Inc (Jehovah's Witnesses) It was renovated and renamed the West Palm Beach Christian Convention Center.

1967-- stuff happened

- 1968 – Palm Beach Atlantic College established.
- 1977 – Snow is reported on January 19 at Palm Beach International Airport from 6:10 a.m. to 8:00 a.m.
- 1979 – Cross County Mall in business.
- 1980 – Population: 63,305.
- 1985 – Plaza hi-rise built.
- 1991
  - Yesteryear Village (museum) opens.
  - March 12: Strong mayor referendum succeeds.
  - November 19: Nancy M. Graham elected first strong mayor of West Palm Beach.
- 1994 – "County Judicial Complex" built.
- 1997 – West Palm Beach Municipal Stadium closes.
- 1999 – Trump International Golf Club in business.
- 2000
  - May: Lake Worth Middle School shooting occurs.
  - October 27: CityPlace opens
  - December 4: Bush v. Palm Beach County Canvassing Board lawsuit decided during the 2000 United States presidential election recount in Florida.
  - City website online (approximate date).
- 2010 – Population: 99,919.
- 2011 – Jeri Muoio becomes mayor.
- 2014 – Palm Beach Outlets opens on the former site of the Palm Beach Mall which closed in 2010.
- 2017 – Ballpark of the Palm Beaches opens (renamed FITTEAM Ballpark of the Palm Beaches in 2018)
- 2017 – Lois Frankel becomes U.S. representative for Florida's 21st congressional district.
- 2024 – Donald Trump, a former president of the United States and nominee of the Republican Party in the 2024 presidential election, survives an assassination attempt while golfing at Trump International Golf Club in West Palm Beach.

== Environment ==
=== West Palm Beach Canal (C51) ===
According to the U.S. Army Corps of Engineers, the West Palm Beach Canal (C-51)/Stormwater Treatment Area (STA)1 East project was authorized by the U.S. Congress under the Flood Control Acts of 1948, 1954, 1962, 1968, and the Water Resources Development Act (WRDA) of 1996. The project is located in Palm Beach County and runs east to west from West Palm Beach at Lake Worth to Water Conservation Area (WCA) No. 1 (Loxahatchee National Wildlife Refuge). The authorized project will provide 30-year flood protection to the urbanized eastern basin and 10-year flood protection to the western basin. All eastern basin features have been completed.

During mediation of the Everglades water quality litigation, a technical plan was developed for resolution of the litigation. The technical plan included a substantially modified C-51 project. The modified plan expands the original 1,600-acre floodwater detention area into a 6,500-acre stormwater detention area. In addition to the flood damage reduction benefits provided by the original project, the modified plan provides water treatment, reduction of damaging freshwater discharges to Lake Worth, and increased water supply for the Everglades and other users.

According to the U.S. Army Corps of Engineers, the total estimated cost of the West Palm Beach Canal (C51) is $375.47 million, with an estimated $345.04 million as the Federal Government's cost share. A total of $1.05 million was appropriated for this project by the U.S. Congress in Fiscal Year 2015. The Fiscal Year 2016 Budget Request from the U.S. President to the U.S. Congress was for $1 million.

== Geography ==
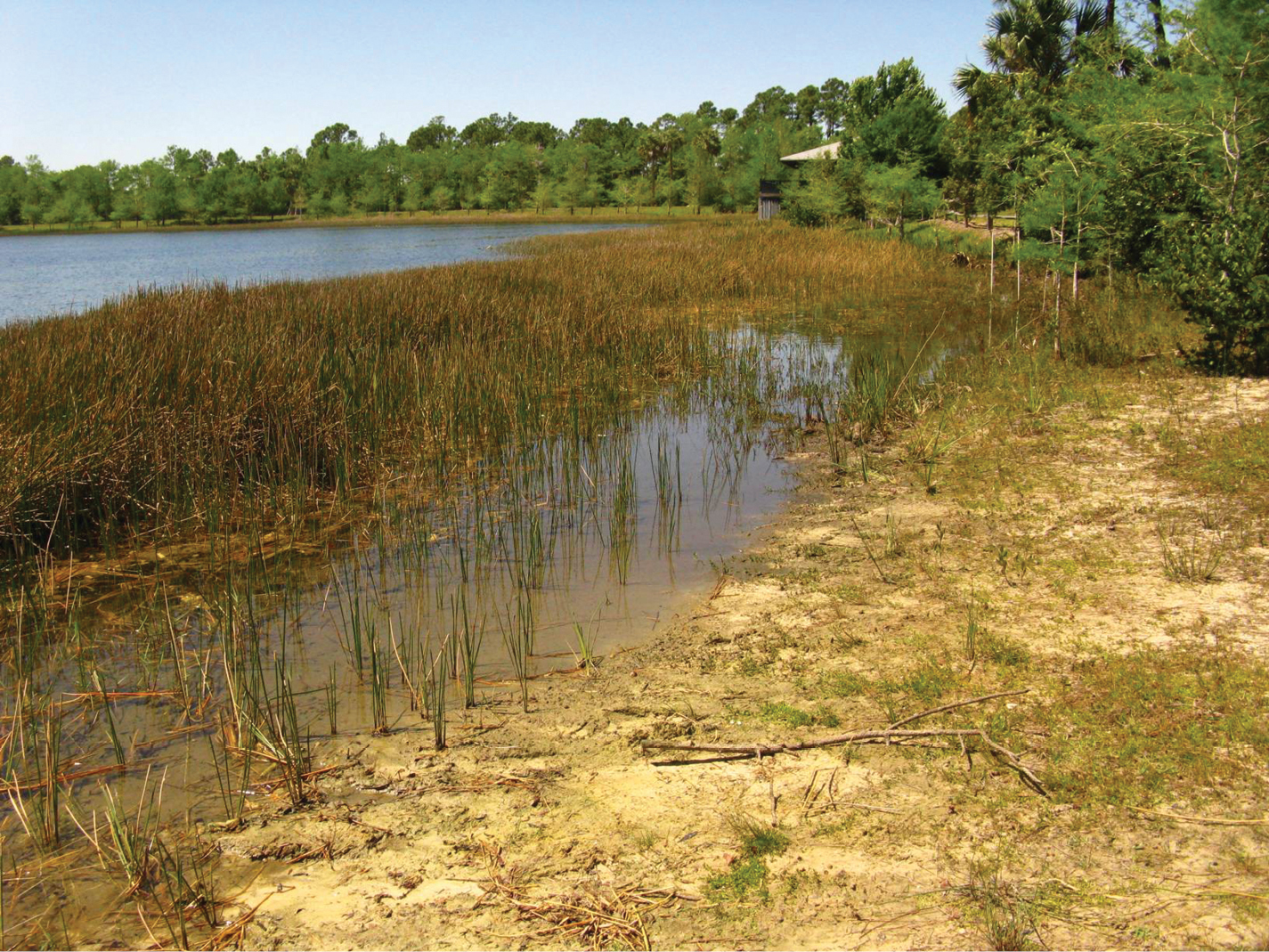
The Grassy Waters Preserve

According to the United States Census Bureau, this city has a total area of 58.2 square miles (151 km^{2}), of which 55.1 square miles (143 km^{2}) is land and 3.1 square miles (8.0 km^{2}) (5.26%) is water.

Due to vast areas of wetland immediately west of the city's downtown, growth occurred north and south in a linear fashion. Until the 1960s, the city was only several blocks wide but over 100 blocks in length. Large scale development finally expanded westward with improved access and drainage in the 1960s. However, the city boundaries were not expanded much with the exception of the "Water Catchment Area", an uninhabited area in the northwest part of the city. Known as Grassy Waters, it serves as a reservoir for the city drinking water and a nature preserve.

=== Places ===
==== Historic neighborhoods and communities ====
West Palm Beach skyline from the north

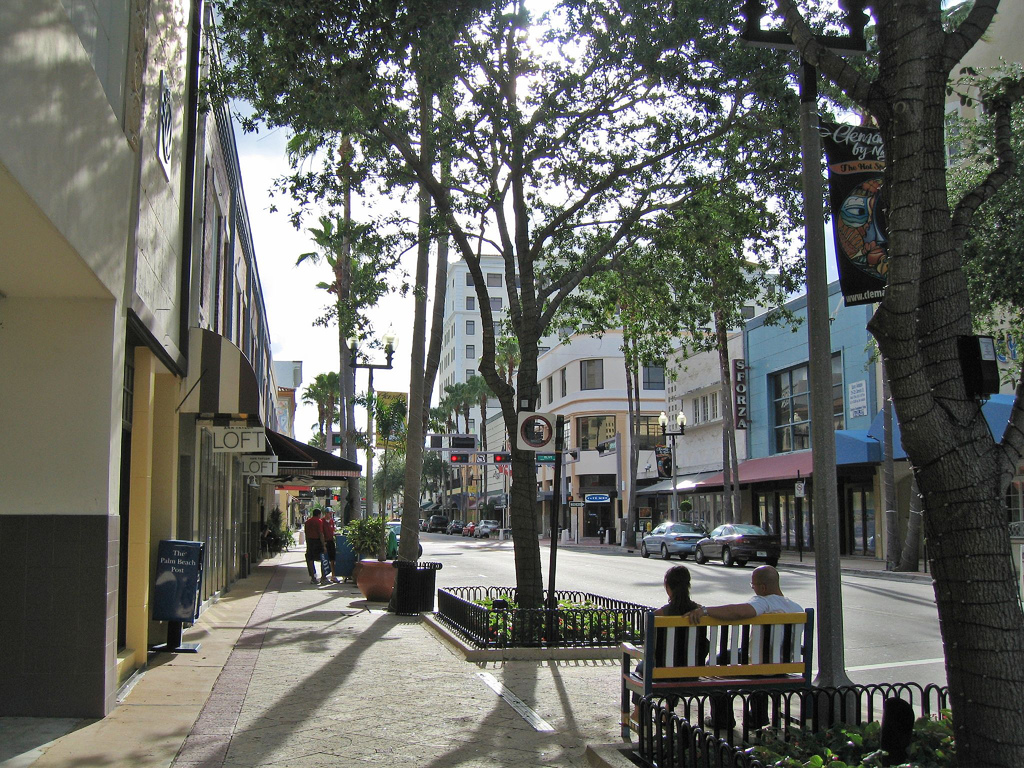
Clematis Street

Comeau Building, Clematis Street

Bel Air Historic District: Developed from 1925 to 1935 as a neighborhood for tradesmen and real estate salesmen who helped develop Palm Beach County, some of Belair was originally a pineapple plantation owned by Richard Hone. Hones's frame vernacular house, built around 1895, still stands at 211 Plymouth Road. After Hone was murdered in 1902, his property was sold to George Currie, who created Currie Development Co. But before it was developed, the land was sold to William Ohlhaber, who raised coconut palms and ferns. Eventually, Ohlhaber platted the subdivision and sold off lots. The first house built in the subdivision was Ohlhaber's mission-style home at 205 Pilgrim. Ohlhaber's grandson said Ohlhaber bought the tract to provide dockage for his 90-foot (27 m) yacht, but the yacht ran aground in the Gulf of Mexico and never reached Lake Worth. In 1947, Hone's house was bought by Henry Flagler's chief engineer Max Brombacher, and it remains in the Brombacher family today. Belair became West Palm Beach's fourth historic district in August 1993.

Central Park: Central Park is a collective name for several subdivisions north of Southern Boulevard. It originally was part of the Estates of South Palm Beach (which extended from Wenonah Place to Pilgrim Road east of Dixie Highway). Like other West Palm Beach neighborhoods, the Estates of South Palm Beach boomed after Henry Flagler's descent on Palm Beach. In 1884, James W. Copp, a bachelor in the boating business, borrowed $367.20 from Valentine Jones to buy the land. The ownership of what is now Central Park changed hands many times before being developed. Around 1919, the tropical wilderness was transformed into an exclusive neighborhood with curbed roads, sidewalks, and a pier (at the foot of what is now Southern Boulevard). The neighborhood became part of West Palm Beach in 1926, and was named a city historic district in December 1993. In 1999, it was listed in the National Register of Historic Places.

El Cid: Noted for its Mediterranean revival and mission-style homes, El Cid developed in the height of Florida's real estate boom. In the late 19th century, most land north of Sunset Road was pineapple fields, but the crop dwindled in the early 20th century. Pittsburgh socialite Jay Phipps subdivided the old pineapple fields in the 1920s and named it El Cid after celebrated Spanish hero Rodrigo Díaz de Vivar, who conquered Valencia in 1094. He was called "Cid", meaning "lord." El Cid became a city historic district in June 1993. In 1995 the neighborhood was listed in the National Register of Historic Places.

Flamingo Park: Originally a pineapple plantation, Flamingo Park was established by local contractors and developers, who saw the potential in this area—one of the highest coastal ridge sections from downtown West Palm Beach to Miami. Some ridge houses even had ocean views from upper floors. Houses cost about $10,000 to $18,000 in the boom era, and many buyers owned shops and businesses on fashionable Dixie Highway nearby. Recently, residents rallied to have stop signs installed through the neighborhood and banded together to ward off commercial and industrial zoning. Property values are rising as residents renovate and restore Spanish-style houses. Most homes in the neighborhood, developed from 1921 to 1930, are mission style, but nearly every style is represented. There are many Mediterranean revival-style houses along the high ridge line. Only two buildings in the historic district are known to have been designed by architects: 701 Flamingo Drive designed by Harvey and Clarke, and the Armory Arts Center designed by William Manly King. The neighborhood became a West Palm Beach historic district in January 1993 and was listed in the National Register of Historic Places in 2000.

Grandview Heights: One of the city's oldest intact neighborhoods, Grandview Heights was built as an extension of Palm Beach Heights from around 1910 to 1925. Almost all of Palm Beach Heights and half of Grandview Heights was demolished in 1989 to make way for the proposed Downtown/Uptown project, which became CityPlace. Grandview Heights originally attracted construction workers who helped build the luxury hotels, ministers, and store owners. The neighborhood has one of the city's best collection of early craftsman-style bungalows, as well as some modest, Mediterranean revival-style homes. The neighborhood became a West Palm Beach historic district in 1995 and was listed in the National Register of Historic Places in 1999.

Mango Promenade: Mango Promenade became a West Palm Beach historic district in 1995 and was listed in the National Register of Historic Places in 1999. Lies just south of Palm Beach Atlantic University.

Northboro Park: An expansion of Old Northwood, Northboro Park was mostly custom houses for upper-middle-class professionals. Most of the houses are Mediterranean revival, mission and frame vernacular. Developed from 1923 to 1940, the neighborhood became the city's second historic district (November 1992) and the historic designation may soon expand north to 45th Street. The oldest building in the neighborhood is Northboro Elementary School at 36th Street and Spruce, built in 1925 by DaCamara and Chace. The demolition of Northboro Elementary School began in late 2009. The first home in Northboro Park is 418 36th St., built in 1923.

Northwest: West Palm Beach's first historic district to be included on the National Register of Historic Places (February 1992), the Northwest neighborhood was first settled in 1894, when the black community was moved from the Styx in Palm Beach to West Palm Beach. It also served as the city's segregated black community from 1929 to 1960 (along with Pleasant City). Northwest remains a predominantly black community but according to the city planning department, most middle- and upper-class blacks moved to other neighborhoods after desegregation. Tamarind and Rosemary Avenues were the commercial centers for blacks by 1915, but most commercial buildings have been demolished or remodeled so the architecture is no longer significant. There are still good examples of late 19th- and early 20th-century American bungalow/craftsman-style homes in this neighborhood, which also has mission, shotgun, Bahamian vernacular, and American Foursquare styles. The Alice Frederick Mickens house, at 801 Fourth St., is listed on the National Register of Historic Places. Mickens was a philanthropist and humanitarian who promoted education for black youth. Another notable house is the Gwen Cherry house at 625 Division Ave. Cherry, Florida's first Black woman legislator and a resident of Miami, inherited the house from relative Mollie Holt, who built the house in 1926. Now it is the Palm Beach County Black Historical Society. The Northwest neighborhood was listed in the National Register of Historic Places in 1992. The next year the neighborhood became a West Palm Beach historic district in 1993.

Old Northwood Historic District: Old Northwood was developed from 1920 to 1927—the height of the city's real estate boom. The Pinewood Development Co., platted and developed the area. Old Northwood became a neighborhood of what was considered extravagant Mediterranean revival, mission, and frame vernacular houses, at $30,000 to $36,000. The buyers were professionals, entrepreneurs and tradesmen. Among them was David F. Dunkle, who was mayor of West Palm Beach. There are houses here designed by notable architects John Volk (best known for his Palm Beach houses), William Manly King (who designed Palm Beach High School and the Armory Arts Center) and Henry Steven Harvey (whose Seaboard Railroad Passenger Station on Tamarind Avenue is listed in the National Register of Historic Places). The neighborhood became a West Palm Beach historic district in 1991 and listed in the National Register of Historic Places in June 1994.

Northwood Hills Historic District: On August 4, 2003, the City Commission designated the Northwood Hills neighborhood as the 13th Historic District in the City of West Palm Beach. Northwood Hills comprises the area from 29th Street on the South to 39th Court on the North. The east side of Windsor is the Western boundary, and Greenwood Avenue is the Eastern boundary. The Neighborhood Association has worked several years to achieve the distinction of historic designation. This is the first district to be designated since 1996. Northwood Hills has a number of Mission Revival houses, a significant collection of Post-World War II architecture, a unique street layout, and one of the highest elevations in the city. The Northwood Hills neighborhood has also elected to allow the establishment of Bed and Breakfast establishments within the neighborhood.

Prospect Park: Promoted as a high-end neighborhood patterned after the prominent Prospect Park district in Brooklyn, this area consisted of mostly smaller estates for prominent businesspeople and northern investors. The neighborhood has a high concentration of Mediterranean revival and Mission revival houses. It was developed from 1920 to 1935 and became a city historic district in November 1993.

West Northwood Historic District: Cashing in on the real estate boom, developers of West Northwood built speculative and custom houses for upper-middle-class professionals from 1925 to '27. Dominant architectural styles are Mediterranean revival and mission. Although the area was declining, that has reversed in recent years, as more investors buy and restore the houses. West Northwood became a city historic district in August 1993.

==== West Palm Beach Census Designated Places and Urbanized Area ====
The estimated 2012 population of West Palm Beach and the immediately adjacent Census Designated Places is 134,795. Much of this urbanized area lies directly west of the city and includes the neighborhoods of Westgate, Belvedere Homes, Lakeside Green, Century Village, Schall Circle, Lake Belvedere Estates, Plantation Mobile Homes, and Golden Lakes. These neighborhoods are not technically within the boundaries of West Palm Beach, being located in unincorporated Palm Beach County. However, residents possess a "West Palm Beach" address and urban services, such as police, fire, parks, water and sewer, are provided by a combination of Palm Beach County and the City of West Palm Beach in these areas. The City of West Palm Beach also provides water and sewer service to the Town of Palm Beach. The contiguous "urbanized" area, of which West Palm Beach is the core city, includes most of eastern Palm Beach County and has an estimated 2008 population of around 1,250,000.

Key incorporated cities and their populations within the West Palm Beach urbanized area include:

1. 89,407 – Boca Raton
2. 71,097 – Boynton Beach
3. 64,072 – Delray Beach
4. 60,202 – Wellington
5. 58,298 – Jupiter
6. 50,699 – Palm Beach Gardens
7. 38,696 – Greenacres
8. 36,306 – Royal Palm Beach
9. 36,000 – Lake Worth Beach
10. 33,263 – Riviera Beach
11. 20,872 – Palm Springs
12. 12,348 – North Palm Beach
13. 10,867 – Lantana
14. 8,649 – Palm Beach
15. 3,472 – Lake Clarke Shores
16. 3,283 – Loxahatchee
17. 2,057 – Atlantis
18. 1,940 – Haverhill
19. 1,939 – Mangonia Park

=== Notable buildings ===
Tallest buildings
| Name | Stories | Height |
|---|---|---|
| One West Palm | 30 | 426 ft (130 m) |
| 515 Fern | 25 | 386 ft (118 m) |
| South Flagler House (2026) | 28 | 373 ft (114 m) |
| One Flagler | 25 | 365 ft (111 m) |
| The Plaza | 32 | 331 ft (101 m) |
| La Clara | 25 | 321 ft (98 m) |
| Forte | 24 | 300 ft (91 m) |
| The Bristol | 25 | 291 ft (89 m) |
| Palm Beach House | 28 | 278 ft (85 m) |
| Placido Mar | 30 | 278 ft (85 m) |
| Esperante | 20 | 278 ft (85 m) |
| Northbridge Centre | 25 | 272 ft (83 m) |
| One Clear Lake Center | 20 | 270 ft (82 m) |
| 360 Rosemary | 18 | 259 ft (79 m) |
| Waterview Tower | 25 | 250 ft (76 m) |
| Phillips Point | 20 | 225 ft (69 m) |

=== Climate ===
West Palm Beach has a tropical rainforest climate (Köppen: Af). The city is situated in USDA hardiness zone 10b, with an annual mean minimum temperature of 37.7 °F (3.2 °C).

There is year-round rainfall, with the majority falling in a wet season from May through October that is hot and humid. The average window for 90 °F (32 °C) temperatures is April 15 through October 10, but temperatures of 100 °F (38 °C) or higher have only occurred four times since record-keeping began in 1888. During this period, more than half of the days bring afternoon thunderstorms and sea breezes that cool the air for the rest of the day. Late in the season, there is also a chance for a tropical storm or hurricane to strike. The area was unusually hard-hit in 2004 and 2005, when Hurricanes Frances, Jeanne and Wilma caused property damage and power outages.

Although it lacks a fully dry season, the period from November through April is warm and drier, with 80 °F (27 °C) temperatures remaining fairly commonplace even from December through February. Occasionally, a stronger cold front can lower daytime temperatures to around 57 °F (14 °C), the annual mean minimum max temperature, and lows to around 38 °F (3 °C). Freezes are rare; the most recent was in February 2026 when it hit 30 °F (−1 °C). This dry season can also bring about potential for drought during hotter, drier seasons.

Climate data for West Palm Beach, Florida (PBI), 1991–2020 normals, extremes 1888–present
| Month | Jan | Feb | Mar | Apr | May | Jun | Jul | Aug | Sep | Oct | Nov | Dec | Year |
|---|---|---|---|---|---|---|---|---|---|---|---|---|---|
| Record high °F (°C) | 90 (32) | 90 (32) | 95 (35) | 99 (37) | 99 (37) | 100 (38) | 101 (38) | 99 (37) | 97 (36) | 95 (35) | 92 (33) | 90 (32) | 101 (38) |
| Mean maximum °F (°C) | 84.3 (29.1) | 85.8 (29.9) | 88.8 (31.6) | 90.4 (32.4) | 91.9 (33.3) | 93.7 (34.3) | 94.2 (34.6) | 94.2 (34.6) | 92.4 (33.6) | 90.0 (32.2) | 86.5 (30.3) | 84.3 (29.1) | 95.4 (35.2) |
| Mean daily maximum °F (°C) | 74.7 (23.7) | 76.7 (24.8) | 79.2 (26.2) | 82.2 (27.9) | 85.7 (29.8) | 88.3 (31.3) | 90.0 (32.2) | 89.9 (32.2) | 88.0 (31.1) | 84.7 (29.3) | 80.0 (26.7) | 76.5 (24.7) | 83.0 (28.3) |
| Daily mean °F (°C) | 66.3 (19.1) | 68.4 (20.2) | 71.1 (21.7) | 74.9 (23.8) | 78.7 (25.9) | 81.7 (27.6) | 83.1 (28.4) | 83.2 (28.4) | 81.9 (27.7) | 78.7 (25.9) | 73.0 (22.8) | 69.0 (20.6) | 75.8 (24.3) |
| Mean daily minimum °F (°C) | 57.9 (14.4) | 60.1 (15.6) | 63.0 (17.2) | 67.5 (19.7) | 71.7 (22.1) | 75.0 (23.9) | 76.1 (24.5) | 76.5 (24.7) | 75.8 (24.3) | 72.6 (22.6) | 66.1 (18.9) | 61.5 (16.4) | 68.6 (20.3) |
| Mean minimum °F (°C) | 40.2 (4.6) | 43.9 (6.6) | 48.2 (9.0) | 55.1 (12.8) | 63.0 (17.2) | 70.3 (21.3) | 71.8 (22.1) | 72.4 (22.4) | 71.5 (21.9) | 59.9 (15.5) | 51.2 (10.7) | 44.4 (6.9) | 37.7 (3.2) |
| Record low °F (°C) | 26 (−3) | 27 (−3) | 26 (−3) | 38 (3) | 45 (7) | 60 (16) | 64 (18) | 65 (18) | 61 (16) | 46 (8) | 36 (2) | 24 (−4) | 24 (−4) |
| Average precipitation inches (mm) | 3.47 (88) | 2.63 (67) | 3.31 (84) | 3.68 (93) | 4.91 (125) | 8.48 (215) | 5.63 (143) | 8.68 (220) | 7.96 (202) | 5.90 (150) | 3.62 (92) | 3.48 (88) | 61.75 (1,568) |
| Average precipitation days (≥ 0.01 in.) | 8.1 | 7.2 | 7.8 | 7.5 | 10.8 | 15.7 | 15.1 | 17.8 | 16.6 | 12.3 | 9.1 | 9.3 | 137.4 |
Source: NOAA

== Demographics ==
Historical population
| Census | Pop. | Note | %± |
|---|---|---|---|
| 1900 | 564 | | — |
| 1910 | 1,743 | | 209.0% |
| 1920 | 8,659 | | 396.8% |
| 1930 | 26,610 | | 207.3% |
| 1940 | 33,693 | | 26.6% |
| 1950 | 43,162 | | 28.1% |
| 1960 | 56,208 | | 30.2% |
| 1970 | 57,375 | | 2.1% |
| 1980 | 63,305 | | 10.3% |
| 1990 | 67,643 | | 6.9% |
| 2000 | 82,103 | | 21.4% |
| 2010 | 99,919 | | 21.7% |
| 2020 | 117,415 | | 17.5% |
| 2022 (est.) | 120,932 | ▲ | 3.0% |
U.S. Decennial Census; 1900–1970 1980 1990; 2000 2010 2020 2022

| Historical racial composition | 2020 | 2010 | 2000 | 1990 | 1980 |
|---|---|---|---|---|---|
| White (non-Hispanic) | 38.3% | 41.6% | 46.0% | 53.2% | 63.0% |
| Hispanic or Latino | 24.6% | 22.6% | 18.2% | 14.2% | 8.6% |
| Black or African American (non-Hispanic) | 30.9% | 31.5% | 31.6% | 31.6% | 27.6% |
| Asian (non-Hispanic) | 2.5% | 2.3% | 1.5% | 0.9% | 0.8% |
| Native American (non-Hispanic) | 0.1% | 0.2% | 0.2% | 0.1% | 0.8% |
| Some other race (non-Hispanic) | 0.6% | 0.3% | 0.2% | 0.1% | 0.8% |
| Population | 117,415 | 99,919 | 82,103 | 67,643 | 63,305 |

| Demographic characteristics | 2020 | 2010 | 2000 | 1990 | 1980 |
|---|---|---|---|---|---|
| Households | 58,706 | 54,179 | 40,461 | 28,787 | 26,578 |
| Persons per household | 2.00 | 1.84 | 2.03 | 2.35 | 2.38 |
| Sex Ratio | 91.7 | 94.8 | 97.3 | 91.6 | 87.9 |
| Ages 0–17 | 18.6% | 19.9% | 21.3% | 20.9% | 21.5% |
| Ages 18–64 | 61.5% | 64.1% | 62.7% | 60.9% | 58.2% |
| Ages 65 + | 19.9% | 16.0% | 16.0% | 18.2% | 20.3% |
| Median age | 39.8 | 38.1 | 36.7 | 35.1 | 35.9 |
| Population | 117,415 | 99,919 | 82,103 | 67,643 | 63,305 |

Economic indicators
| 2017–21 American Community Survey | West Palm Beach | Palm Beach County | Florida |
|---|---|---|---|
| Median income | $33,645 | $36,431 | $34,367 |
| Median household income | $56,549 | $68,874 | $61,777 |
| Poverty Rate | 17.0% | 11.6% | 13.1% |
| High school diploma | 86.8% | 89.1% | 89.0% |
| Bachelor's degree | 36.8% | 38.0% | 31.5% |
| Advanced degree | 14.2% | 15.0% | 11.7% |

| Language spoken at home (Note: Language spoken at home among residents at least five years old; only languages (or language groups) which at least 2% of residents have spoken at any time since 1980 are mentioned) | 2015 (Note: Refers to 2013–2017 American Community Survey data; the last Decennial Census where language data was collected was in the 2000 census) | 2010 (Note: Refers to 2008–2012 American Community Survey data; the last Decennial Census where language data was collected was in the 2000 census) | 2000 | 1990 | 1980 |
|---|---|---|---|---|---|
| English | 68.5% | 69.1% | 71.7% | 78.6% | 87.1% |
| Spanish or Spanish Creole | 20.4% | 21.9% | 17.5% | 13.6% | 8.3% |
| French or Haitian Creole | 5.7% | 4.6% | 5.7% | 3.9% | 1.0% |
| Other Languages | 5.4% | 4.4% | 5.1% | 3.9% | 3.6% |

| Nativity | 2015 (Note: Refers to 2013–2017 American Community Survey data; the last Decennial Census where foreign-born population data was collected was in the 2000 census) | 2010 (Note: Refers to 2008–2012 American Community Survey data; the last Decennial Census where foreign-born population data was collected was in the 2000 census) | 2000 | 1990 | 1980 |
|---|---|---|---|---|---|
| % population native-born | 73.0% | 72.6% | 75.3% | 81.3% | 87.1% |
| ... born in the United States | 70.2% | 70.0% | 73.1% | 79.0% | 85.9% |
| ... born in Puerto Rico or Island Areas | 1.6% | 1.5% | 1.5% | 1.5% | 1.2% |
| ... born to American parents abroad | 1.2% | 1.2% | 0.7% | 0.8% | 1.2% |
| % population foreign-born (Note: Only countries of birth which at least 2% of residents were born in at any time since 1980 are mentioned) | 27.0% | 27.4% | 24.7% | 18.7% | 12.9% |
| ... born in Haiti | 3.7% | 3.4% | 3.5% | 2.5% | N/A (Note: Not counted separately; aggregated into "Other" category) |
| ... born in Cuba | 3.4% | 3.8% | 4.4% | 4.9% | 4.7% |
| ... born in Jamaica | 3.3% | 2.7% | 2.2% | 2.0% | 0.5% |
| ... born in Guatemala | 3.3% | 3.9% | 2.4% | 0.4% | N/A |
| ... born in other countries | 13.3% | 13.6% | 12.2% | 8.9% | 7.7% |

In 2000, the median income for a household in the city was $36,774, and the median income for a family was $42,074. Males had a median income of $30,221 versus $26,473 for females. The per capita income for the city was $23,188. About 14.5% of families and 18.9% of the population were below the poverty line, including 29.2% of those under the age of 18 and 14.8% of those ages 65 and older.

== Government and infrastructure ==
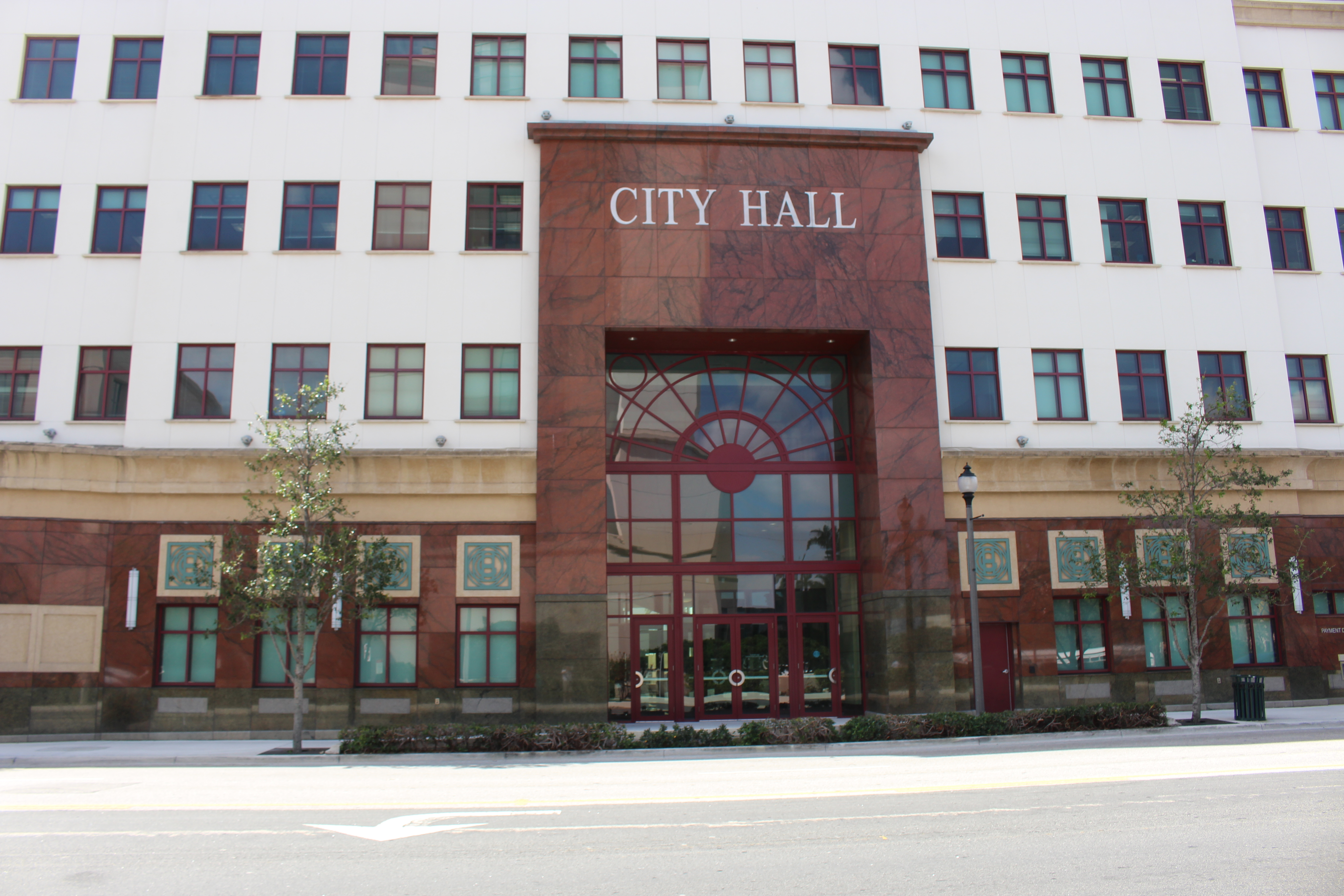
West Palm Beach City Hall

West Palm Beach is governed via the Mayor-council system. The mayor is elected in a citywide vote. The five members of the city council are each elected from districts.

The United States Postal Service operates several post offices in the city limits:

- Downtown West Palm Beach
- Northwood
- Palm Beach Carrier Annex

Additionally, the Haverhill BR, Palms Central, and West Palm Beach (including the window unit) post offices are located in an unincorporated area, while the Lake Park Post Office is located in Lake Park, despite having a West Palm Beach address.

West Palm Beach has its own police force, the West Palm Beach Police Department.

== Education ==
=== Public K–12 education ===
K–12 public education is administrated by the School District of Palm Beach County, which is the tenth-largest school district in the United States by enrollment.

Overall, 18 public elementary schools serve students within the city limits or in unincorporated areas, including Belvedere, Benoist Farms, Egret Lake, Forest Hill, Grove Park, Hope-Centennial, Meadow Park, Northboro, Northmore, Palm Beach, Palmetto, Pleasant City, Roosevelt, Seminole Trails, South Olive, U.B. Kinsey/Palmview (Performing and Visual School of the Arts Magnet School), West Gate, and Westward Elementary School.

Public middle school students are served by nine different schools, including Bak Middle School of the Arts, Bear Lakes, Conniston, Jeaga, John F. Kennedy, Okeeheelee, Palm Springs, Roosevelt, and Western Pines. There are also six public high schools for students in West Palm Beach or nearby unincorporated areas, including Dreyfoos School of the Arts (Performing and Visual School of the Arts Magnet School), Forest Hill, G-Star School Of The Arts, Palm Beach Gardens, Palm Beach Lakes, and Royal Palm Beach.

==== Charter and multi-level ====
- Palm Beach Maritime Academy – K–10 moving to K–12
- Gardens School Of Technology Arts – K–8
- University Preparatory Academy – K–3

=== Private schools ===
Private schools in the area include:

- Berean Christian School
- Cardinal Newman High School
- The King's Academy
- American Heritage School
- Indian Ridge School
- Palm Beach Day Academy
- The Benjamin School
- Oxbridge Academy of the Palm Beaches
- Rosarian Academy
- Saint Ann Catholic School
- Matlock Preparatory Academy

=== Post-secondary education ===
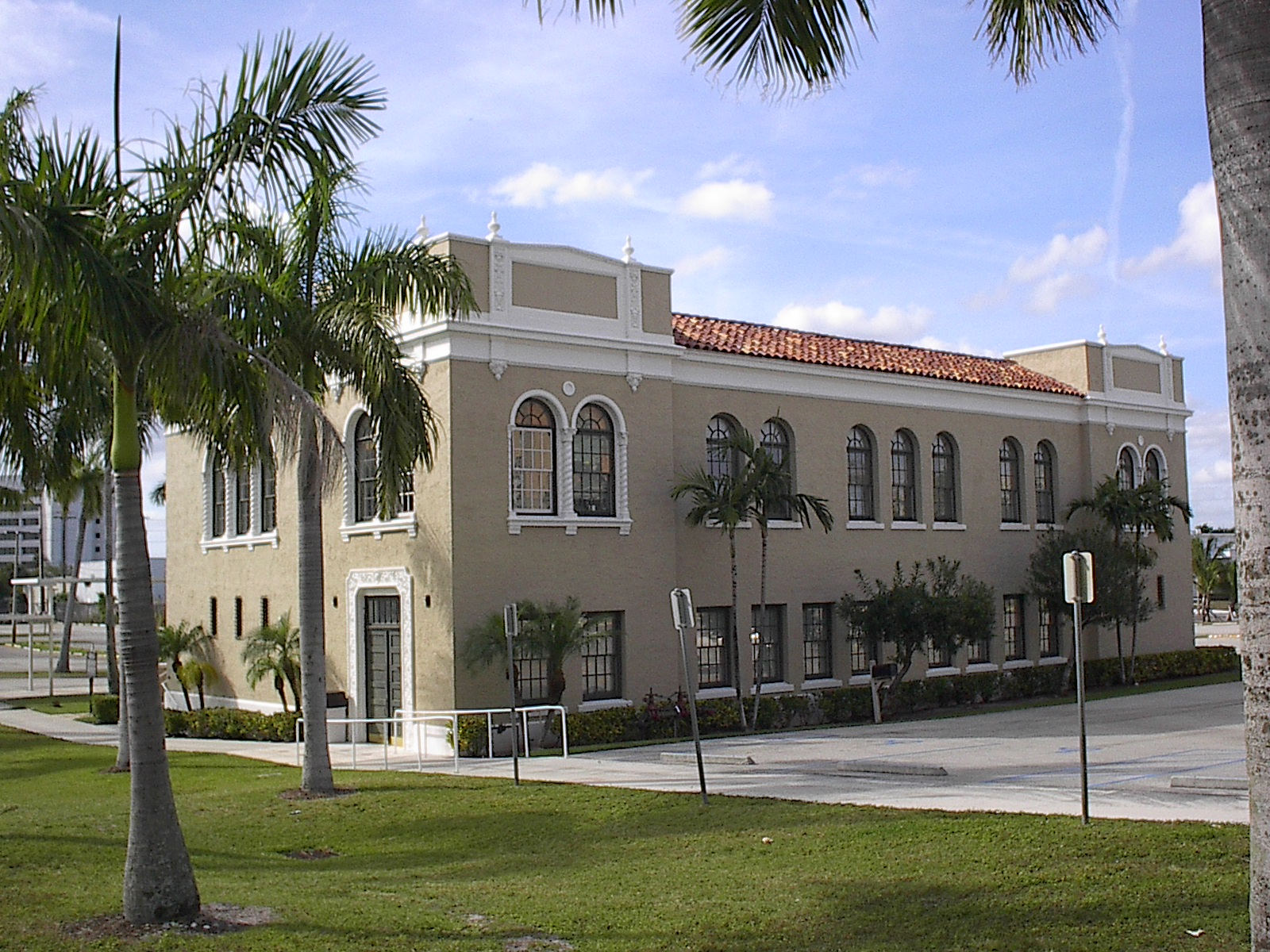
Original Palm Beach Junior College building

The original Palm Beach Junior College building was restored and is now adjacent to the campus of the Dreyfoos School of the Arts, a magnet performing and visual arts high school. It is now a satellite building of Palm Beach State College.

Palm Beach Atlantic University lies along the Intracoastal Waterway Lake Worth Lagoon.

Palm Beach Atlantic University (PBAU), a four-year private Christian university with approximately 3,200 students, is located in the city on seven blocks within the south end of downtown. The campus includes several historic structures converted to academic use. PBAU has recently added schools of nursing and of pharmacy.

Northwood University formerly had a residential campus in West Palm Beach, Florida. The campus now belongs to Keiser University, a regionally accredited school that offers a variety of degrees at the Associate, Bachelor, Master, and Doctoral levels. It is one of their 16 Florida campuses.

Various private for-profit institutions are located in the city, including the Lincoln College of Technology (formerly known as New England Institute of Technology), Florida Culinary Institute, owned by the New Jersey-based Lincoln Group of Schools, and Southeastern College.

=== Libraries ===
The Mandel Public Library of West Palm Beach serves the city. The new city public library opened in April 2009 at 411 Clematis Street, replacing the 1962 building which stood at the intersection of Clematis Street and Flagler Drive, along the Intracoastal Waterfront. Named for a Mandel Foundation grant received in 2012, the Mandel Public Library provides books, performances, classes, research, entertainment, technology, music and more.

The Main Branch of the Palm Beach County Library System is also located in West Palm Beach, as well as the Okeechobee Branch Library.

== Economy ==
Companies based in West Palm Beach include Affiliated Managers Group, Florida Public Utilities, ION Media Networks, Ocwen, and The Palm Beach Post. Other major employers are Pratt & Whitney, Aerojet Rocketdyne, Sikorsky Aircraft, General Dynamics, Cemex, and CSC.

== Arts and culture ==
Norton Museum of Art: is the largest art museum in Florida and also organizes traveling exhibits. The permanent collection features 19th and 20th century European and American art, Chinese, contemporary art and photography.

Kravis Center for the Performing Arts: Built in 1992, the Kravis Center hosts performances of music, dance, opera and theatre.

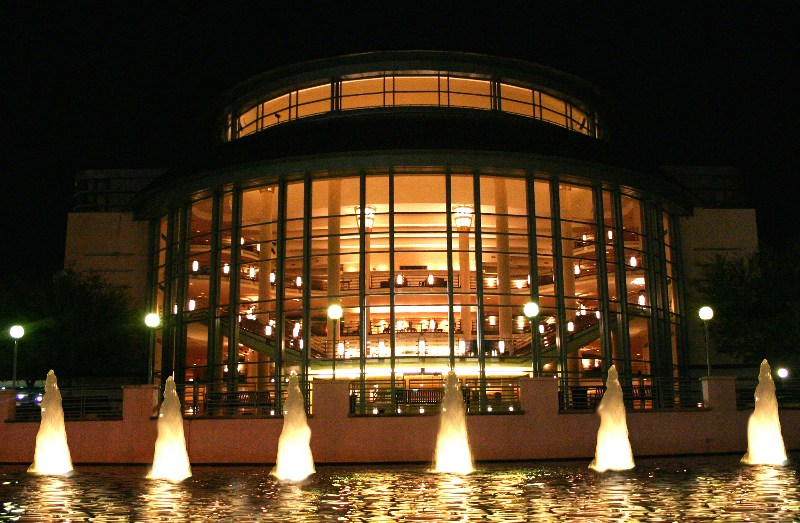
The exterior of the Raymond F. Kravis Center for the Performing Arts

Meyer Amphitheater: An abandoned Holiday Inn, demolished on New Year's Eve 1993 and transformed into an outdoor waterfront amphitheater.

Richard and Pat Johnson Palm Beach County History Museum: is operated and maintained by the Historical Society of Palm Beach County, and is in the Historic 1916 Court House in downtown West Palm Beach. The museum provides access to Palm Beach County history through on-site investigation in the Research Library, on-line research on www.pbchistoryonline.org, the Public Programming Series and the Distinguished Lecture Series. The museum is free to visitors and offers Docent-led tours for adults and school groups.

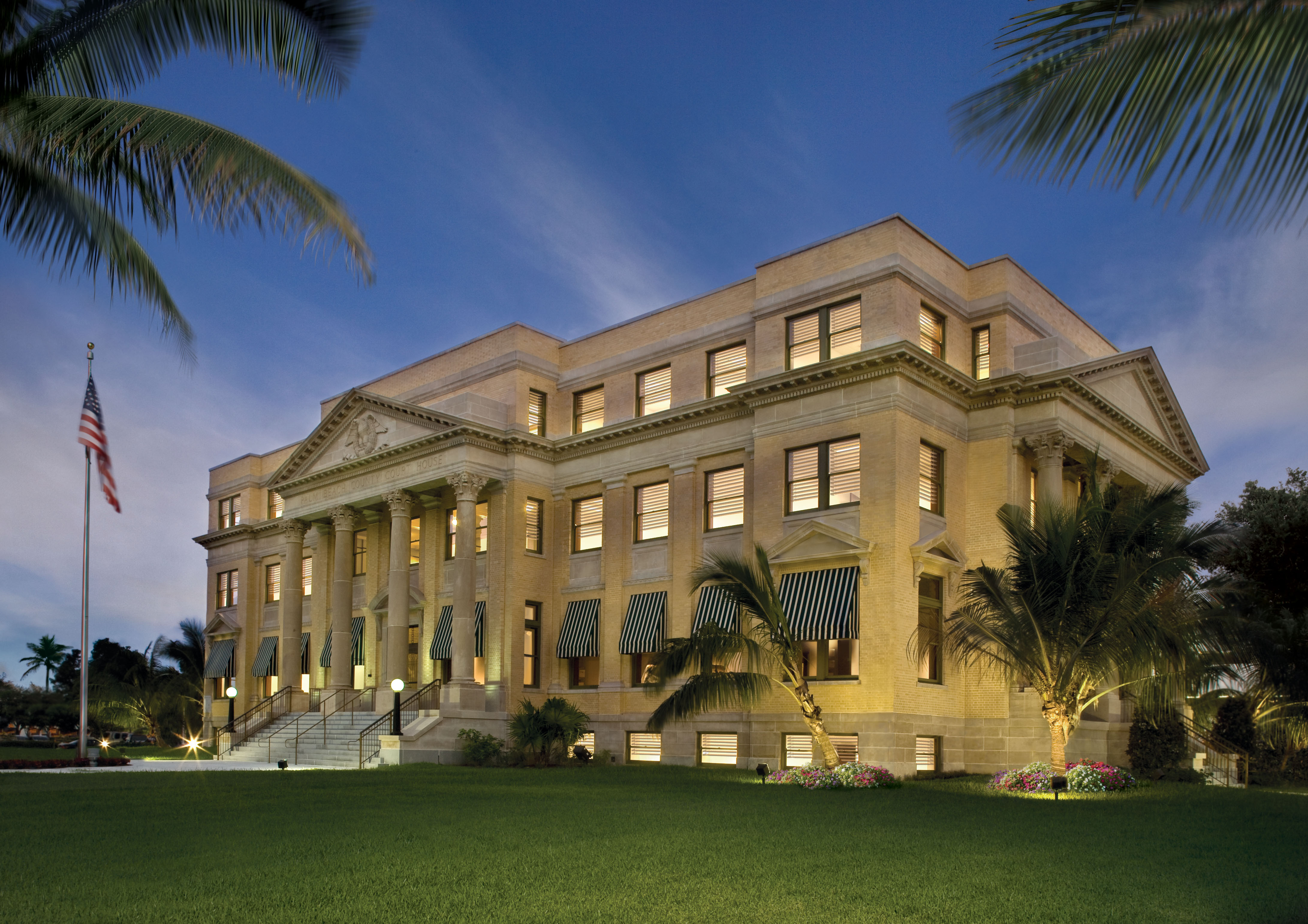
Richard and Pat Johnson Palm Beach County History Museum

Palm Beach County Convention Center: A complex with 350,000 square feet (33,000 m^{2}) of exhibit halls and meeting rooms in downtown West Palm Beach.

Harriet Himmel Theater: is a multi-use theater and historic church, and is the cultural centerpiece of CityPlace.

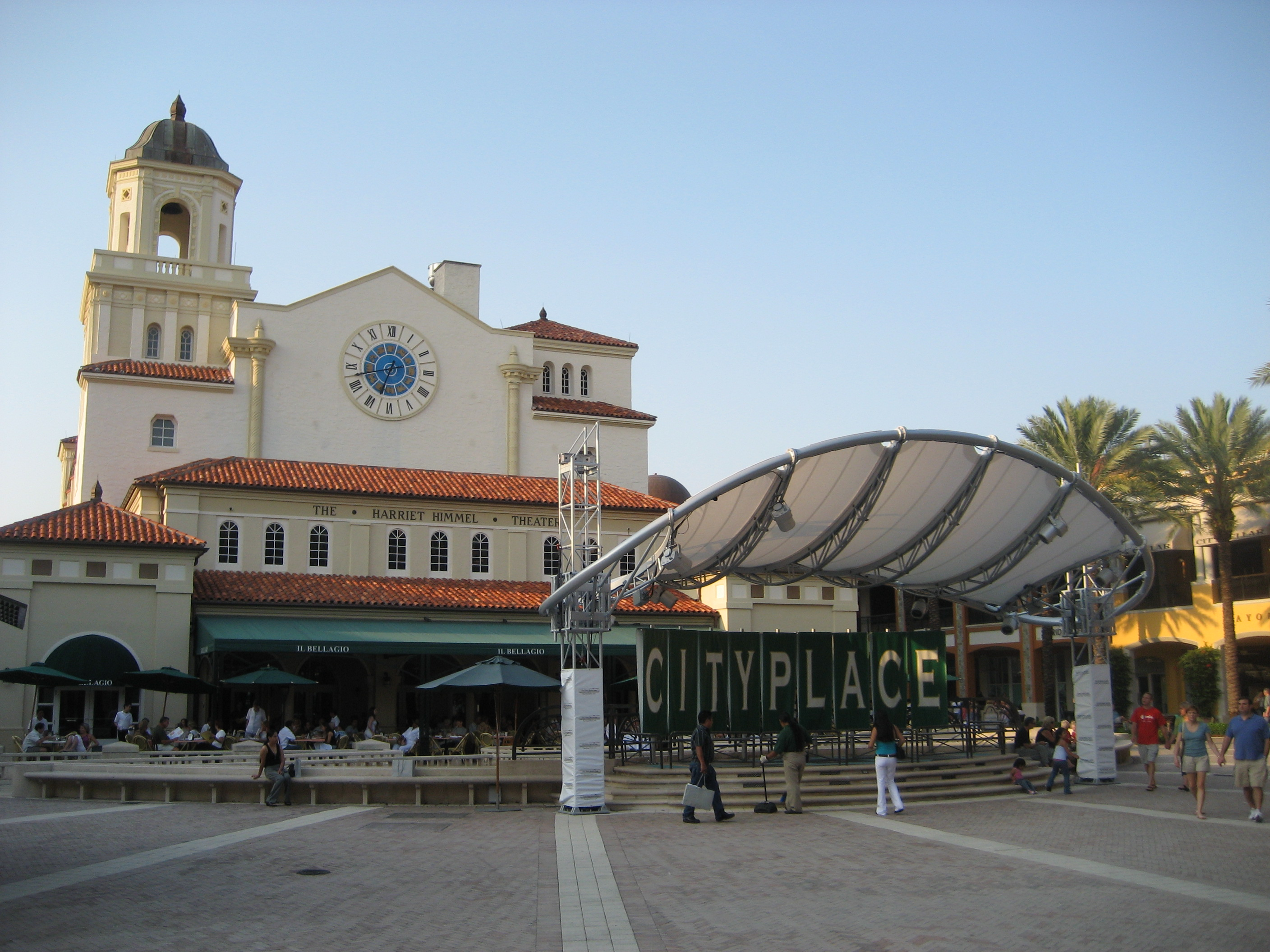
Harriet Himmel Theater

The Carefree Theatre: Built in 1940, in the historic Flamingo Park district, it was variously an art house cinema and alternative music performance venue until severely damaged by Hurricane Wilma.

There is a Jewish community offering learning and cultural activities.

=== Festivals and shows ===
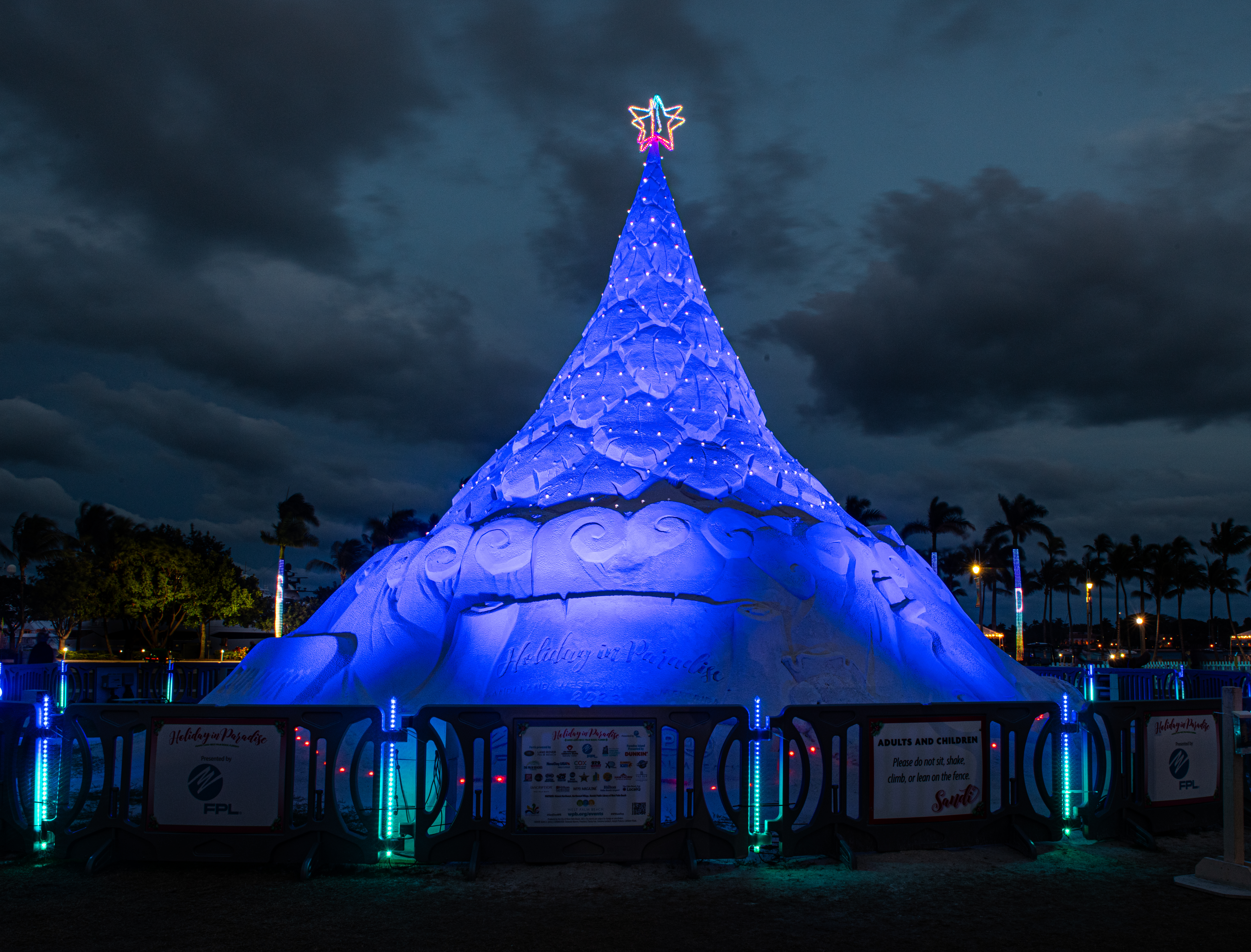
Sandi Tree in Blue

SunFest is Florida's largest waterfront music festival

SunFest: an annual music, art, and waterfront festival in Florida, founded in 1982 to draw visitors to the area during the "shoulder season" of April and May. SunFest has an annual attendance of more than 275,000 people. Artists who have performed include Nas, James Brown, Celia Cruz, Hall & Oates, Snoop Dogg, Earth Wind and Fire, Logic, Kool & the Gang, Ice Cube, George Clinton & Parliament Funkadelic, Santana, Little Richard, Willy Chirino, The Roots, Damian Marley, Isaac Hayes, Chuck Berry, The Temptations, The Beach Boys, Ohio Players, Cee Lo Green, Mac Miller, Musiq Soulchild, Ray Charles, Ed Sheeran, J. Cole, Pitbull, Billy Idol, Dizzy Gillespie, Cyndi Lauper, and The Wailers. SunFest is a 501(c)3 non-profit organization.

The Sandi Tree is a 35-foot-tall (11 m) sand sculpture weighing 700 tons and decorated with lights. The tree is displayed at the Centennial Square Fountain during Decembers. A laser light show plays each night during the Holiday Season.

Palm Beach International Film Festival

Barrett-Jackson Collector Car Auction: Classic car auction held every March in the South Florida Expo Center.

Palm Beach Opera

== Sports ==
West Palm Beach does not host any professional sports team, but the Florida Panthers of the National Hockey League play at Amerant Bank Arena in Sunrise to the south. Major League Baseball's Miami Marlins, the National Football League's Miami Dolphins and the Miami Heat of the National Basketball Association all play in nearby Miami-Dade County. In the past, West Palm Beach has hosted various professional teams such as arena football, minor-league ice hockey, baseball, and semi-professional football teams.

=== Spring training baseball ===
The Ballpark of the Palm Beaches opened in February 2017 and accommodates the Houston Astros and Washington Nationals for spring training. The Miami Marlins and St. Louis Cardinals conduct spring training in suburban West Palm Beach in the town of Jupiter at Roger Dean Stadium. In the past, West Palm Beach hosted spring training for the St. Louis Browns from 1928 to 1936, the Philadelphia Athletics from 1946 to 1954, and the Kansas City Athletics from 1955 to 1962 at Connie Mack Field, which was demolished in 1992, and for the Milwaukee Braves from 1963 to 1965, the Montreal Expos from 1969 to 1972 and from 1981 to 1997, and the Atlanta Braves from 1966 to 1997 at West Palm Beach Municipal Stadium, which was demolished in 2002.

=== Collegiate athletics ===
Palm Beach Atlantic University competes in NCAA Division II basketball, baseball and soccer. PBAU recently purchased a large tract of land west of downtown where a multi-use athletic stadium will be constructed. Indoor athletics play their home games at the Greene Complex which is an on-campus arena. Florida Atlantic University's athletic programs are played in nearby Boca Raton. FAU competes in the highest level of NCAA athletics including football, basketball, baseball, softball and tennis. Keiser University competes at the NAIA level, where their former basketball coach Rollie Massimino, helped in giving the athletic program national exposure.

=== Professional golf ===
PGA National Resort & Spa in suburban Palm Beach Gardens hosts the PGA Tour Honda Classic.

=== Polo and equestrian ===
Palm Beach Polo and Country Club counts seven polo fields among its world-class facilities and many high-goal games are played in the area. The equestrian events at the Palm Beach International Equestrian Center are the world-renowned Winter Equestrian Festival, the Global Dressage Festival, and over 40 weeks a year of equestrian competitions, hosted in Wellington.

=== Tennis ===
The Delray Beach International Tennis Championships, a hard court stop on the ATP Tour, takes place annually in Delray Beach, slightly to the south of West Palm Beach.

=== Croquet ===
The National Croquet Center has 12 full sized croquet lawns, making it the largest dedicated croquet facility in the world. It hosts several national championships and in May 2009 will host the World Championship when representatives of up to 25 countries will be competing for the Wimbledon Cup.

=== BMX racing ===
Okeeheelee Park contains one of the most celebrated BMX race tracks in the state of Florida. Insured by USA BMX, the Okeeheelee track is host to state qualifiers and national races, as well as being home to several national champions.

== Tourism and recreation ==
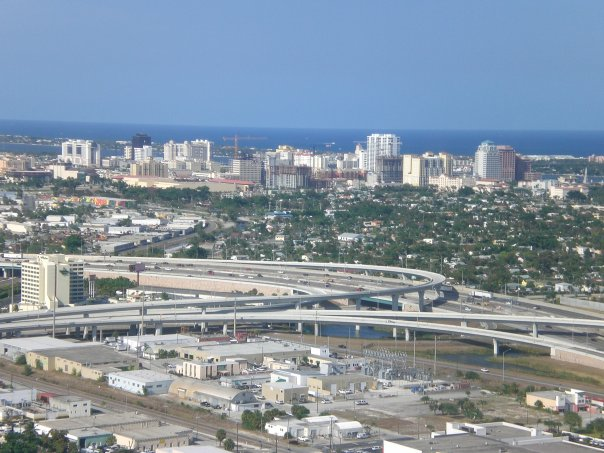
I-95/PBIA Interchange, Downtown WPB in background

- Palm Beach Zoo at Dreher Park
- West Palm Beach Parks and Recreation
- Rapids Water Park
- South Florida Science Museum
- Lion Country Safari
- International Polo Club Palm Beach
- National Croquet Center
- Trump International Golf Club (West Palm Beach)
- West Palm Beach Fishing Club

=== Shopping areas/districts ===
Clematis Street: is West Palm Beach's historic "main street" and shopping venue, home to Clematis by Night, an outdoor event held on the street with live music and food. During the fall and winter months, Clematis is also home to the WPB GreenMarket.

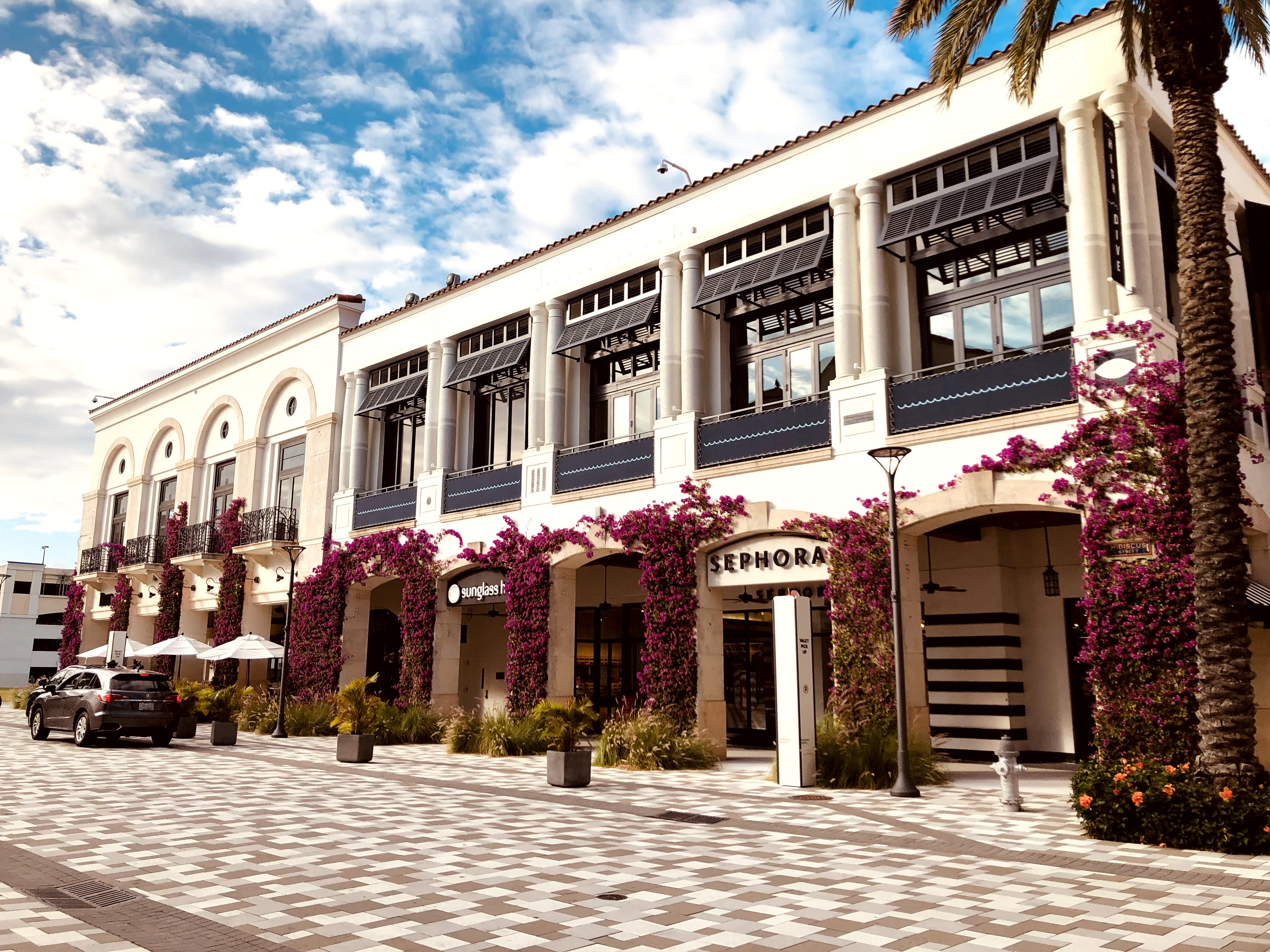
Building at CityPlace

CityPlace: Opened in 2000 on re-developed land where dilapidated single family homes and apartments once stood, CityPlace houses night clubs, restaurants, clothing and home-decor retail outlets, and multi-story town houses and apartments.

Palm Beach Outlets: Opened in 2014, it was developed on the site of the former Palm Beach Mall. Palm Beach Outlets features over 130 stores and is located directly off Interstate 95 on Palm Beach Lakes Boulevard.

Antique Row: is a shopping district on the south side of the city along Dixie Highway. Architectural Digest, The New York Times, Art & Antiques, and House Beautiful have all noted Antique Row as one of the east coast's premier antique districts, considered the "antique design center" of Florida.

Northwood Village: is an historic commercial district north of downtown. The city invested money in rebuilding the streetscape and promoting the area as an arts district.

== Transportation ==
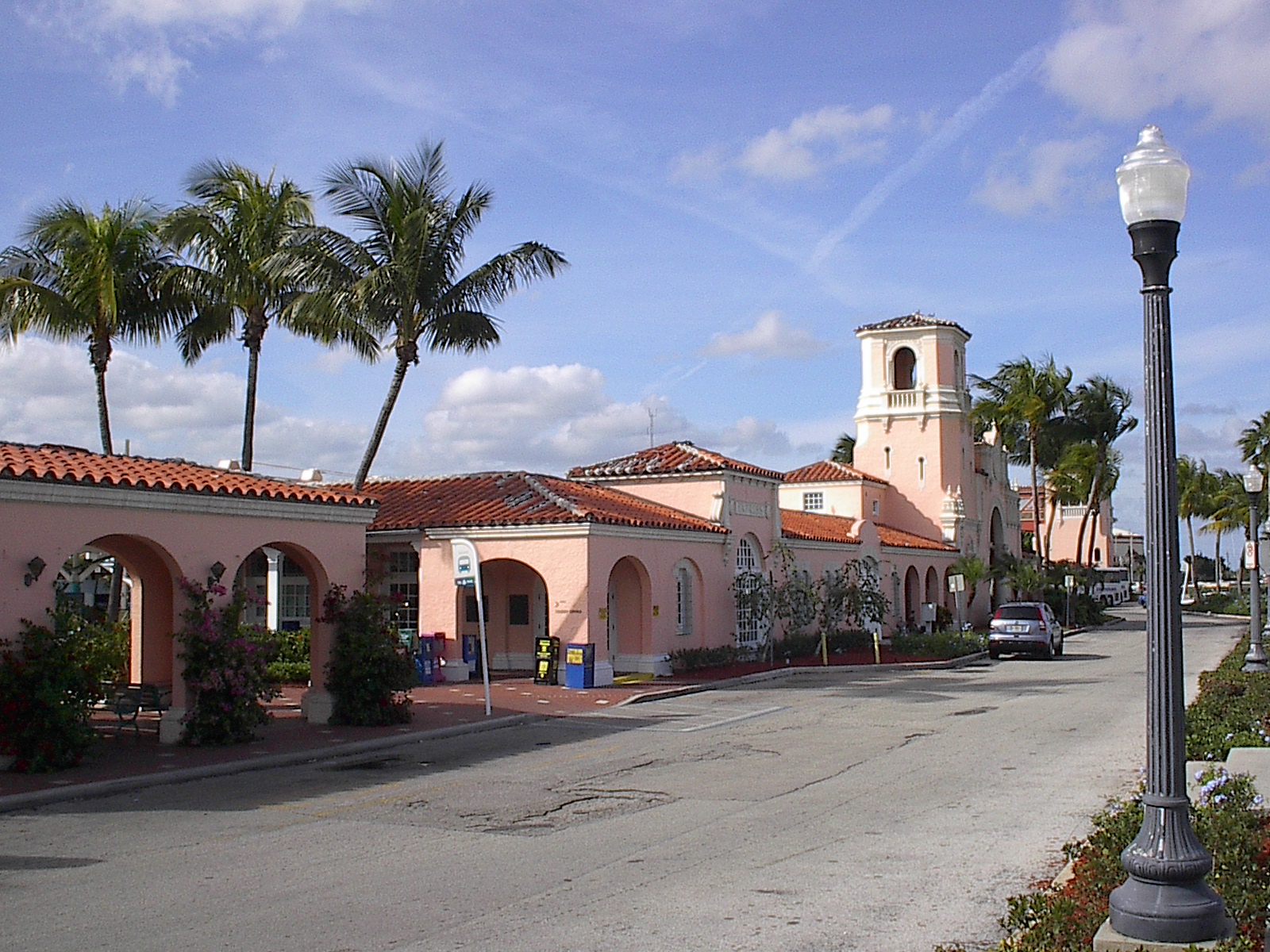
The historic Seaboard Air Line Station serves both Amtrak and Tri-Rail

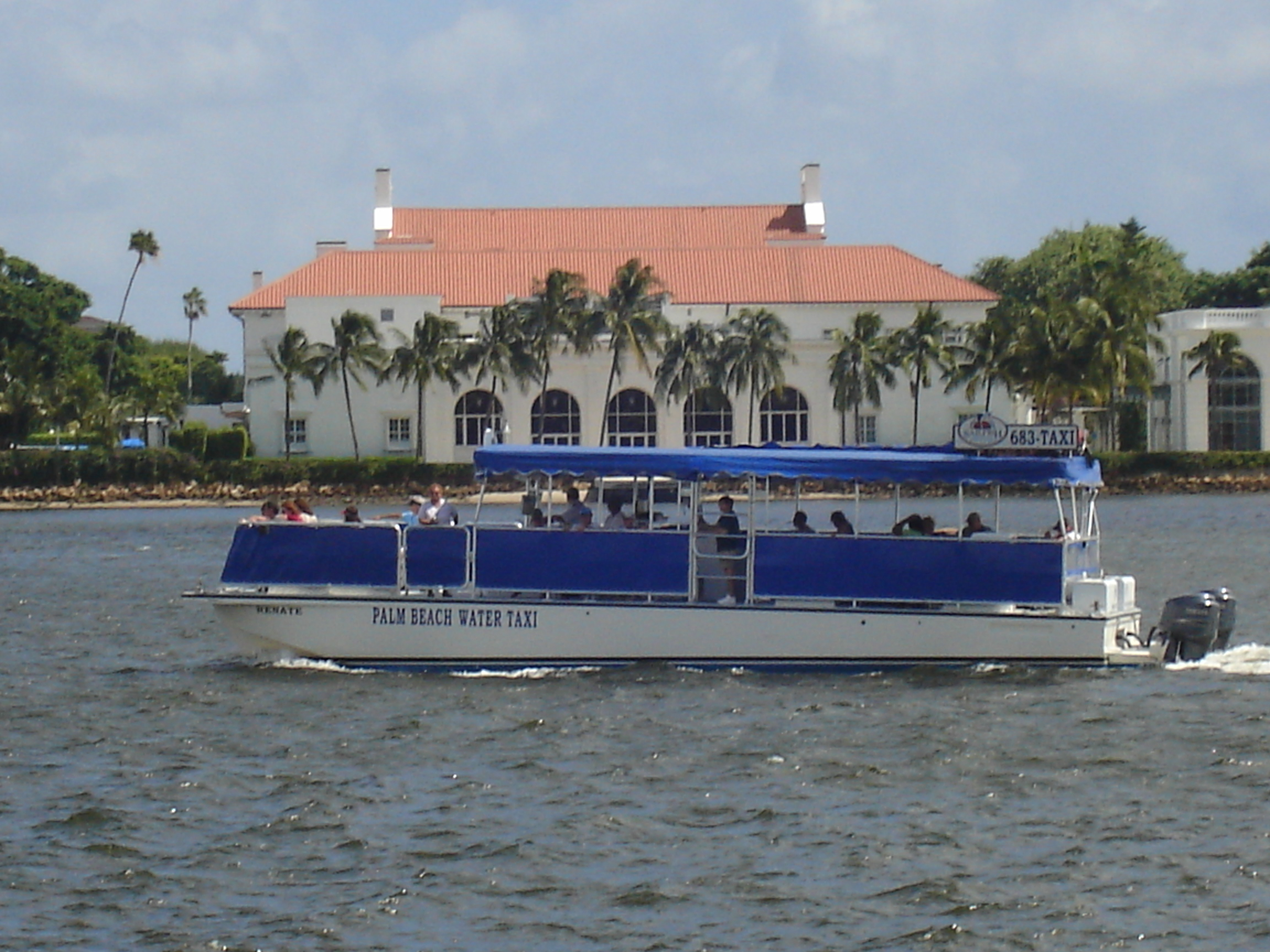
The Water Taxi is means of transportation in West Palm Beach.

=== Air ===
The city is served by Donald J. Trump International Airport, located in unincorporated Palm Beach County. The airport attracts people from all over the county as well as from the Treasure Coast and Space Coast counties to the north. In 2014, there were over 6.5 million passengers who passed through the gates of DJT, making it the 52nd busiest airport in the nation.

=== Bicycle ===
The city's flat terrain, early paved streets, and year-round climate quickly earned it the designation as the "bicyclingest town in the U.S.A.". The historic core consists of a dense grid of narrower streets, laid out by Henry Flagler. Clematis Street was one-lane each direction with a speed limit of 12 mph, and the middle of the street between lanes was used to park bicycles. The popularity of bicycling declined during the later half of the 20th century, but has undergone a renewed increase in popularity. In addition, a bike share program, SkyBike, was introduced in 2015, and the city's mobility plan calls for protected bike lanes on most downtown streets.

=== Highways ===
U.S. 1 passes through the city's downtown, commercial, and industrial districts. Interstate 95 bisects the city from north to south with multiple interchanges serving West Palm Beach, including an entrance to Palm Beach International Airport. Florida's Turnpike passes through West Palm Beach further west, connecting with the western suburbs of Royal Palm Beach and Wellington. State Road 80, running east–west, is a partial expressway, that runs from Interstate 95 to State Road 7.

=== Rail ===
Amtrak has daily long-distance trains, Silver Meteor and Silver Star, arriving and departing to points north and Miami to the south as well. Tri-Rail commuter rail system serves the city from a historical station located on the west side of Tamarind Avenue, just east of I-95. Tri-Rail provides commuter rides north to Mangonia Park and south to Miami. All Aboard Florida began track upgrades in 2015 in preparation for higher-speed passenger service serving Miami through Orlando. Service on All Aboard Florida's Brightline service from West Palm Beach to Fort Lauderdale began on January 12, 2018. Service was extended from Fort Lauderdale to Miami on May 19, 2018. The freight rail companies, CSX Transportation and the Florida East Coast Railway also serve the city.

=== Trolley ===
There is a free downtown trolley that provides transportation around downtown including Clematis, City Place, Tri Rail Station, Palm Beach Outlets, and Waterfront districts of the city.

=== Bus ===
Greyhound Lines operates scheduled intercity bus service out of the train station on the west side of Tamarind Avenue. Palm Tran, the Palm Beach County municipal bus service, operates scheduled service throughout the city and the suburban areas of Palm Beach County.

=== Port ===
The Port of Palm Beach is located on the northern edge of the city limits. It is the fourth busiest container port in Florida and the 18th busiest in the continental United States. In addition to intermodal capacity, the Port is a major modal point for the shipment of various goods as well as being the home to several small passenger cruise lines.

=== Water taxi ===
As a waterfront city there is specific need for water transportation between points in the city and surrounding areas. Waterway transportation is available to and from the downtown Clematis Street District, Sailfish Marina Resort, waterfront attractions, Peanut Island, and special events.

== Media ==
=== Newspapers ===
The Palm Beach Post is owned by Virginia-based Gannett. Its name notwithstanding, the Post is based in West Palm Beach, not Palm Beach. The Post is the 57th highest daily circulation in the country, according to the 2007 BurrellesLuce survey, and is the city's sole daily newspaper. It serves Palm Beach County and the Treasure Coast, the area north of Palm Beach County that includes Martin and St. Lucie Counties.

The Palm Beach Daily News, another publication owned by Gannett, serves the town of Palm Beach. It frequently covers issues and affairs of the Palm Beach city council. It also extends coverage to events taking place in West Palm Beach.

South Florida Sun-Sentinel, is based in Fort Lauderdale and covers portions of Southern Palm Beach County.

New Times Broward-Palm Beach is an alternative weekly publication serving West Palm Beach along with Fort Lauderdale.

WPB Magazine is a quarterly publication serving West Palm Beach.

=== Radio ===
West Palm Beach is ranked as the 46th largest radio market in the country by Arbitron.

=== Television ===
West Palm Beach is ranked as the 38th largest television market in the country by Nielsen Media Research. The market is served by stations including WPTV-TV 5 (NBC), WHDT 9 (Independent), WPEC 12 (CBS), WBWP-LD 19 (Purple TV), WPBF 25 (ABC), WFLX 29 (FOX), WTVX 34 (The CW), WXEL-TV 42 (PBS), WTCN-CD 43 (MyTV), WWHB-CD 48 (Roar), WFGC 61 (CTN), and WPXP-TV 67 (Ion).

Miami television stations also serving the West Palm Beach area include WLTV 23 (Univision), WSCV 51.4 (Telemundo) and WAMI-DT 69 (UniMás). In addition to those, many Miami/Ft. Lauderdale market television stations are also available and viewed in West Palm Beach.

== Crime ==
West Palm Beach
- Crime rates* (2012)

Violent crimes
- Homicide: 17
- Rape: 31
- Robbery: 334
- Aggravated assault: 439
- Total violent crime: 821

Property crimes
- Burglary: 1,289
- Larceny-theft: 3,801
- Motor vehicle theft: 314
- Arson: 21
- Total property crime: 5,404
- Note: Reported crimes per 100,000 population Source: 2012 FBI UCR Data

Violent crime: According to Florida Department of Law Enforcement (FDLE) statistics, West Palm Beach is experiencing a steep drop in major crimes. In the past decade, crime dropped more in West Palm Beach than any other major city (approximately 100,000 residents or more) in Florida. In 1993, West Palm Beach was featured in a 60 Minutes segment on urban decay. At the time, 80% of downtown properties were vacant. Since then, the city has done much to improve its image, at least in the physical sense. Occupancy is high, and housing prices have risen rapidly. FDLE statistics show the total crime rate per 100,000 residents has dropped by over 50% since 2000, from 13,880 that year to 6,571 in 2008. In 2008 alone, there was a 17.9% drop in crime. Annual crime rates are always more than three times the national average. However, as of 2006, the city's crime average has been gradually decreasing while robbery was up 17 percent. West Palm Beach's northern neighbor, Riviera Beach, has an even higher violent crime rate.

The following are the crime rates, per 100,000 people, for West Palm Beach as of 2005.

== Sister cities ==
West Palm Beach has three sister cities, as designated by Sister Cities International:

- Mersin, Turkey
- Tzahar, Israel
- Budva, Montenegro

== Notable people ==
- Andy Abad, MLB first baseman for Oakland Athletics, Boston Red Sox and Cincinnati Reds
- Stephanie Abrams, Weather Channel meteorologist
- Tori Amos, singer-songwriter
- Ottis Anderson, NFL player New York Giants, MVP of Super Bowl XXV
- Jeff Atwater, State Senator, Florida Legislature, Palm Beach County
- Agnes Ballard, architect and educator, one of the first women elected to office in Florida
- Bob Barker, entertainer, game show host, The Price Is Right
- Scottie Barnes, professional basketball player for the Toronto Raptors
- Zinn Beck, MLB infielder
- Dickey Betts, Allman Brothers Band member
- Dante Bichette, MLB outfielder
- Jason Bonham, drummer, son of Led Zeppelin's John Bonham
- Don Brewer, Grand Funk Railroad drummer
- Jimmy Buffett, singer and entertainer
- Virginia Spencer Carr, biographer and literary critic
- Diana Canova, actress
- Chris Carrabba, singer-songwriter from Dashboard Confessional
- Anthony Carter, NFL player
- Tom Carvel, of Carvel Ice-cream stores
- Glenn Close, actress
- John Collins, professional basketball player for the Atlanta Hawks
- Bob Cousy, basketball Hall of Famer and TV commentator
- Allen Covert, comedian, actor, writer, and producer.
- Marshall Criser, president of University of Florida
- Arlene Dahl, actress
- Vic Damone, singer and actor
- Dale Dawson, NFL player
- Phil Dawson, NFL placekicker for San Francisco 49ers
- Ted DiBiase, Jr., professional wrestler
- Alexander W. Dreyfoos, Jr., entrepreneur and philanthropist
- Watson B. Duncan III, acting coach and mentor to Burt Reynolds
- Mabel Evelyn Elliott, physician and humanitarian to Armenian and Greek refugees
- Heath Evans, fullback for New Orleans Saints and graduate of The Kings Academy
- Mark Foley, U.S. Congressman
- Andrés Galarraga, MLB baseball player
- Anthony Goldwire, NBA player
- Murray H. Goodman, real estate developer
- Ken Green, PGA golfer
- Jill S. Grigsby, sociologist
- Deidre Hall, actress, graduate of Lake Worth High School in central Palm Beach County
- George Hamilton, actor, graduate of Palm Beach High School
- Derek Harper, NBA player, New York Knicks and Dallas Mavericks
- William Harris, tennis player
- Alcee Hastings, U.S. Congressman
- John Havlicek, basketball Hall of Famer
- Ryan Hawblitzel, baseball player
- Tyler Herron (1986–2021), baseball pitcher
- Devin Hester, NFL player
- Hey Monday, alternative rock band
- Bill Hicks, comedian
- Jay Howard, British professional race car driver
- Dick Howser, manager of 1985 World Series champion Kansas City Royals
- Travis Hunter, professional football player
- Tommy Lee Jones, actor
- Michael Jordan, basketball Hall of Famer
- Ron Klein, U.S. Congressman
- Blake Koch, NASCAR driver
- Brooks Koepka, professional golfer
- Joey Kramer, Aerosmith drummer
- Larry the Cable Guy, comedian
- Debi Laszewski, IFBB professional bodybuilder
- Theresa LePore, Supervisor of Elections
- Tatjana Maria, german professional tennis player
- David McCampbell, naval aviator during World War II
- AJ McLean, of the Backstreet Boys
- Tony McQuay, gold and silver medalist 2016 Summer Olympics, track and field
- Matthew Mercer, voice actor and dungeon master
- Taylor Motter, utility player for the St. Louis Cardinals
- Marta Fernandez Miranda de Batista, First Lady of Cuba (1952–1959)
- Bob Mitchell, Negro league baseball player
- Edgar Mitchell, astronaut who walked on moon
- Ruthie Morris, guitarist of Magnapop
- Jim Palmer, baseball Hall of Famer
- Barbara Pariente, former Justice and Chief Justice of Florida Supreme Court
- James Patterson, author
- Cassadee Pope, winner of The Voice season 3
- Jamieson Price, actor, voice-over artist
- Judge Reinhold, actor
- Burt Reynolds, actor, graduate of Palm Beach High School
- Dusty Rhodes (baseball coach), college baseball coach
- Randi Rhodes, radio talk show host
- Adrian Rogers, president Southern Baptist Convention and pastor of Bellevue Baptist Church
- William J. Ronan, (1912–2014) chairman New York State MTA; president of NYU
- Jarrod Saltalamacchia, MLB catcher
- Melani Sanders, content creator
- Ron Sellers, NFL player for Dallas Cowboys
- Ben Silverman (born 1987), professional PGA golfer
- Steve Sipek (Stjepan Sipek), actor, stage name Steve Hawkes
- Howard Stern, radio talk show host
- Peggy Stewart, actress
- Surfer Blood, indie rock band
- Vinny Sutherland, NFL player, graduate of Palm Beach Lakes High School
- Tenth Avenue North, contemporary Christian rock band
- Robby Thompson, MLB second baseman for San Francisco Giants
- Otis Thorpe, NBA player for Houston Rockets and Detroit Pistons
- Devon Travis, former MLB player who is currently a coach for the Atlanta Braves
- Tiffany Trump, daughter of U.S. president Donald Trump, born in West Palm Beach
- Maryly Van Leer Peck, American academic, first woman engineer graduate from University of Florida
- Kyril Vassilev, Bulgarian-American portrait painter
- Larry Walker, MLB right fielder, first Canadian to win Most Valuable Player Award (MVP) of MLB
- Steve Walsh, NFL quarterback, football head coach
- Robert Wexler, U.S. Congressman
- Serena Williams, professional tennis player
- Venus Williams, professional tennis player
- Yanni, composer
- Nick Zano, actor
- Virginia Zeani, opera singer
- Snot, rapper

== See also ==
- Okeeheelee Park

== Bibliography ==
- "West Palm Beach". Florida Gazetteer and Business Directory 1907-1908. R. L. Polk & Co. 1907.
- "West Palm Beach". Florida State Gazetteer and Business Directory. R. L. Polk & Co. 1918.
- "West Palm Beach". Automobile Blue Book. Vol. Middle Atlantic and Southeastern. 1922.
- Federal Writers' Project (1939). "West Palm Beach". Florida: a Guide to the Southernmost State. American Guide Series. New York: Oxford University Press. p. 314+.
- Dora Doster Utz (1973). "West Palm Beach" (PDF). Tequesta. 33. Historical Association of Southern Florida. ISSN 0363-3705 – via Florida International University. (Personal remembrance, circa 1900s-1950s)
- Gordon L. Williams (1979). "West Palm Beach that I Remember" (PDF). Tequesta. 39. Archived from the original (PDF) on March 18, 2015 – via Florida International University. (Personal remembrance, circa 1920s)
- H. J. Roberts (1994). West Palm Beach Centennial Reflections. West Palm Beach: Sunshine Sentinel Press. ISBN 1884243029.
- Everee Jimerson Clarke (2005). Pleasant City, West Palm Beach. Black America. Charleston, South Carolina: Arcadia.
- Lynn Lasseter Drake; Richard A. Marconi (2006). West Palm Beach: 1893 to 1950. Images of America. Charleston, South Carolina: Arcadia. ISBN 9781439633472.
- Paul T. Hellmann (2006). "Florida: West Palm Beach". Historical Gazetteer of the United States. Taylor & Francis. ISBN 1-135-94859-3.
