= Palm Beach County Library System =

Public library system in Florida

Coordinates: 26.6627131°N 80.0986233°W

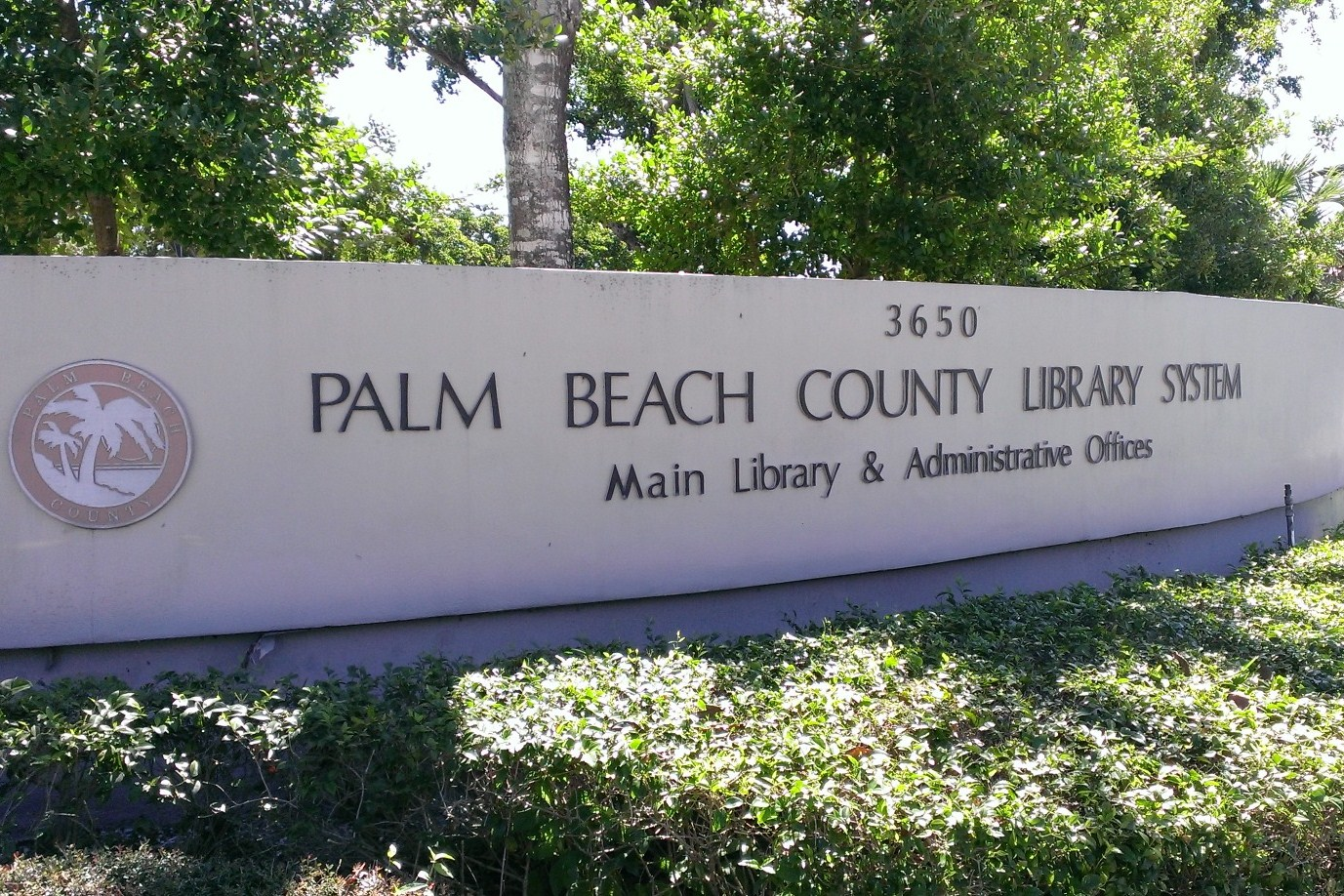
- Location: Palm Beach County, Florida, United States
- Type: Public library
- Reference to legal mandate: 1967
- Branches: 17

Collection
- Size: 1.7 million

Access and use
- Circulation: 9 million (2012)

Other information
- Director: Doug Crane
- Website: www.pbclibrary.org

The Palm Beach County Library System is the public library system of Palm Beach County, Florida, United States. Its headquarters, the Main Library, is located in an unincorporated area near West Palm Beach, the county seat. The system was established in 1967 and serves Palm Beach County through the Main Library and 20 branch libraries. Its first library branch opened in Tequesta on September 25, 1969, and its first bookmobile five days later. Unlike neighboring Broward and Miami-Dade counties, where most municipalities have joined their county's library system, most municipalities in Palm Beach County continue to operate their own city libraries, leading the county system to focus on the more suburban communities. Instead, a cooperative system model is in place to allow interoperation between county and municipal libraries.

== History ==
Prior to 1965, there were two attempts to establish a library system in Palm Beach County. One early effort was in 1943, when the Palm Beach County Library Association, a group of local librarians, tried to "align community library services and promote resource sharing". However, this attempt failed within a few years. Following this, unincorporated Palm Beach County residents requested that the Board of County Commissioners "undertake an improvement of library service in the county". This was not successful either.

However in the spring of 1965, the League of Women Voters attended a public hearing, where with approximately 200 people in attendance, they gave a presentation. This presentation was successful in getting the Board of County Commissioners to appoint a fifteen-member committee to study the feasibility of a county library system.

The committee's report found that "there were fourteen municipal libraries serving about 217,000 people, leaving about 107,000 individuals without easy access to library services". Subsequently, the committee recommended that a library system be formed and overseen by Palm Beach County.

The Palm Beach County Library System was formally established in 1967, with a special act creating the Palm Beach County Library Taxing District. In 1968, Florence Biller of the State Library in Tallahassee was appointed as the library director of the fledgling Palm Beach County Library System and the first female Palm Beach County department director. On September 25, 1969, the Palm Beach County Library System opened its first branch in Tequesta, Florida. Its first bookmobile was opened five days later.

In April 1979, following the recommendations of the Waters' report,, which called for the immediate consolidation of all library services in the county, the quest to appoint a permanent library director was initiated. By the deadline of June 15, 1979, a pool of fifty-two applications had been received from librarians across seventeen states. This diverse group of candidates underwent a screening process by a committee from the Library Advisory Board. Cecil Beach, then the Broward County Library Director and a former Florida State Librarian, also played a role in evaluating the applicants. After rigorous interviews and consideration, Jerry W. Brownlee was recommended for the position of library director. Brownlee officially assumed his role as library director on October 15, 1979.

Also in 1979, the Palm Beach County Library System began looking into acquiring a "computerized circulation system". "Automated Library Information System" (ALIS) was the first computerized circulation system used by the Palm Beach County Library System and it was launched in February 1983. Around the same time, the system began its Mail-a-Book program, which expanded to include more northern county residents in 1984. In 1985, plans to expand the Palm Beach County Library System budget also received backlash from library officials, as the proposed $300,000 to be added to the budget would have been, according to library officials, too meager to open any new branches or to take care of needed maintenance, including leaking buildings and book shortages. In spite of these financial limitations, assistance from the community saw the Royal Pam Beach Branch reopen in a repurposed old office building, helping the branch increase services, programs, and materials for patrons. Budget conflicts continued into 1986, with further calls for expanded hours, children's areas, more space for books and activities, and increased staffing included in increasingly louder calls from both Brownlee and other library advocates. The same year, as a result of a referendum, citizens of Palm Beach County approved a budget of $21 million for the expansion and renovation of the system. As a result, in 1987 and 1988, new branches were announced in order to meet increasing community needs.

The following year, 1989, saw the Palm Beach County Library system add an electronic card catalog called Data Research to facilitate material retrieval for patrons and was among the first public libraries in the state of Florida to adapt an electronic system. The Palm Beach County System also added the Loula V. York Memorial Library Branch in Pahokee, Florida, to its system in the same year, with citizens of Pahokee voting to transfer its ownership and management to the county from its previous status as a municipal library.

Into the present day, Palm Beach County Libraries have continued to develop technological offerings for patrons, such as the installation of self-check terminals at various branches beginning in 2009.

The latest branch of the Palm Beach County Library System, Canyon Branch Library, opened in January 2025 and is the county's 18th branch. Canyon spans 33,000 square feet and is one of the largest branches in the system. The branch, located in Boynton Beach, was designed by the architectural firm of Colomé & Associates, Inc., to be open and spacious to accommodate over 130,000 items and provide comfortable, reading areas for immersion and connection. Canyon has a six-marble column art installation at the front of the building called Opening Minds, by Brad J. Goldberg, featuring famous quotes from American and World history and binary code to emphasize both traditional and digital world viewpoints. The library also has an atrium, drive-up window for pick-up and return, substantial children’s and teens’ areas, a makerspace, and a community meeting room accommodating up to 300 people.

As of May 2024, Palm Beach County Libraries announced that they will be working toward budget approval to replace the older Main Branch Library building with a new, larger space by 2030, pending County Commissioners' decision. Another smaller branch, the 19th location, is in the concept stage for the town of Hypoluxo.

== Services ==
The Palm Beach County Library System provides services to area patrons. The Adult Literacy Project partners with the Literacy Coalition of Palm Beach County to provide those learning English as a second language with one-on-one tutoring classes, informal conversation sessions, and other resources to improve English speaking skills. Project members encourage community participation in the program, including educational materials, sponsors, tutors, volunteers, student workshops and cultural events. The Adult Literacy Project was recognized with an Achievement Award in 2023 from NACo (National Association of Counties) for developing a program to improve students’ English proficiency, which leads to increased attainment of educational, citizenship, employment, and other personal goals.

The Palm Beach County Library System provides on and off-site story time service to local child centers, as well as workshops to assist teachers in storytelling techniques. The libraries within the Palm Beach County Library System also offer a social gathering venue and educational and craft programs for children and teens of various ages. The education-based programs are also meant to offer new skills, tutoring opportunities and teach safety skills. They also offer many online and technology-related classes for all ages. All the classes are focused on specific age groups. Adults are also offered an array of programs for socializing, education, and entertaining. These classes focus on subjects such as practice of the English language, stress, Meditation, Yoga, crocheting, poetry, music and movie viewing. Some of these classes are focused on professional tasks such as taxes, résumé updates, new computer skills, online learning, and Medicare. The Palm Beach County Library System offers an Ask-a-Librarian service, where individuals can receive live reference service without entering a library building.

Each class is designed to meet the needs of local citizens within their area. The library also offers Books-By-Mail, a Deaf Resource Center, and Talking Books services to those in special populations. Book Club in a Bag is another service offered which facilitates the selection of titles (English and Spanish) for local book club meetings. Multiple copies of the title and discussion notes are included. The library system also offers a Speakers Bureau, where library staff will visit civic organizations, homeowners associations and volunteer groups to give presentations on the services and opportunities available at the library.

Each library offers many different forms of media such as books, comics, DVDs, CDs, magazines, newspapers, digital eBooks, audiobooks and many other options. Electronic and digital items can be located and downloaded from associated programs such as CloudLibrary and hoopla.

The Palm Beach County Library System provides a number of special services, including passports, government research, Genealogy Research Service, consumer health information, and CreationStations. Government research entails research, information, and document delivery services to government clients, staff, and elected officials in Palm Beach County. The GRS Collection includes legal documents, government serials, professional journals, and local and state collections. The genealogy research service provides access to family history sources including biographical books, genealogy Internet links, genealogy programs, how-to book listings, local city directories, local historical sites, newspapers, and journals. The consumer health information service offers health and medical information to residents of Palm Beach County.

The Jupiter Branch Library has a Seed Library, featuring vegetable and flower seeds available free to anyone. Five small packets a month can be selected that contain enough seeds to grow a few plants. The seeds are kept by the patron; there is nothing to return to the library.

== Removal of late fees ==
On October 1, 2019, the Palm Beach County Library System stopped charging late fees. It is one of many library systems in the United States to do so, as research has showed that fines have discouraged people to return to the library, which often disproportionally affects low-income families.

== New website ==
In 2023 the library system transitioned into using BiblioCommons for their online platform. Members can participate in the literary community by leaving book reviews and offering valuable insights and recommendations for others. The platform allows users to curate personalized book lists, making it easier to track reading goals and discover new titles. The change also streamlines the process of signing up for various library activities, such as workshops and classes.

== Branches ==
The library system has 20 locations throughout Palm Beach County:

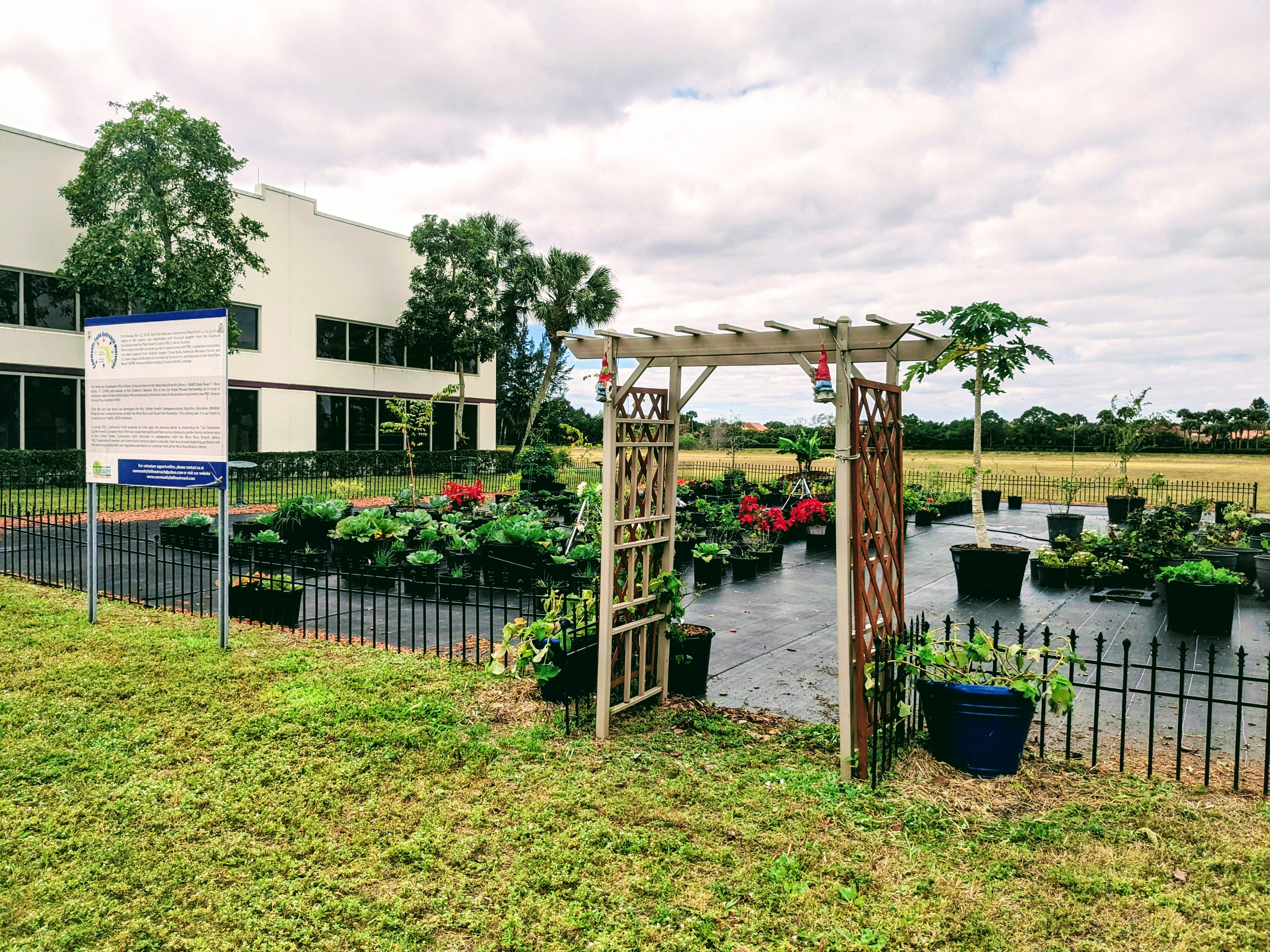
Veterans Community Micro-Farm at the West Boca Branch Library, Boca Raton, FL

- Main Library in West Palm Beach
- Acreage Branch in Loxahatchee
- Belle Glade Branch in Belle Glade - originally a municipal library, taken over by the county on October 1, 1986
- Canyon Branch in Boynton Beach
- Bookmobile
- Clarence E. Anthony Branch in South Bay
- Gardens Branch (formerly North County Regional) in Palm Beach Gardens
- Glades Road Branch (formerly South County Regional) in Boca Raton
- Greenacres Branch in Greenacres
- Hagen Ranch Road Branch in Delray Beach
- Jupiter Branch in Jupiter
- Lantana Road Branch in Lake Worth Beach
- Library to Go -Government Center West Palm Beach, Florida
- Loula V. York Branch in Pahokee - originally a municipal library, taken over by the county on October 1, 1989
- Okeechobee Boulevard Branch in West Palm Beach
- Royal Palm Beach Branch in Royal Palm Beach
- Tequesta Branch in Tequesta
- Wellington Branch in Wellington
- West Boca Branch in Boca Raton
- West Boynton Branch in Boynton Beach

The Palm Beach County Bookmobile offers a selection of books. Including fiction and nonfiction in regular and large-print. Bookmobile staff help patrons with finding books and research questions. The Bookmobile stops at various Palm Beach County locations each week.

== Funding ==
The library's proposed budget for FY2024 was $96,337,654. The majority of the budget is funded by ad valorem revenue raised through the County Library District. The library also receives an annual Florida State Aid to Public Libraries grant. As in the past, alternative revenue sources are sought to supplement ad valorem funding. The following revenue sources are sought on an ongoing basis: Universal Service Fund (E-Rate) discount program, impact fees, grant opportunities, Friends of the Library fundraising projects, and the U.S. passport processing program at the Main Library.
