= Melani Sanders =

American content creator and social media influencer

- Born: 1980 (age 45–46); West Palm Beach, Florida
- Occupations: Content creator; social media influencer
- Known for: We Do Not Care Club
- Children: 3
- Website: www.wedonotcareclub.com

Melani Sanders is an American content creator and social media influencer. She is the founder of the We Do Not Care Club, the club for women in "perimenopause, menopause and post menopause. We are putting the world on notice that we simply do not care much anymore." The club is an international rally cry encouraging women to share their experiences about their experiences in the various stages of menopause. Sanders has over four million followers across Instagram, TikTok, Facebook and YouTube.

== Career ==
On May 13, 2025, Sanders posted her first We Do Not Care Club video, wrapping it up with a call to action for followers to share what they did not care about as they embarked on their perimenopausal, menopausal or post-menopausal journey. It resulted in a viral engagement, with women sharing in the comments. Sanders has two million followers on Instagram and over one million followers on Tiktok. Sanders has said that she "didn’t plan to start a movement. I just hit record on a day that I was barely holding it together."

The We Do Not Care Club is online, with chapters all over the world of women posting their list of items that they "simply do not care much about anymore" as they enter their respective stages of menopause in Sanders' trademark deadpan and humorous delivery.

In September 2025, Sanders appeared on The Drew Barrymore Show for a "Fearless After 50" roundtable discussion with Halle Berry, Valerie Bertinelli, and Nate Burleson.

Sanders' first book, The Official We Do Not Care Club Handbook: A Hot-Mess Guide for Women in Perimenopause, Menopause, and Beyond Who Are Over It, released in January 2026, is a New York Times Best Seller.

== Personal ==
Sanders lives in West Palm Beach, Florida with her husband and their three children.
