= Nancy M. Graham =

American educator, lawyer and politician (born 1946)

Mayor of West Palm Beach, Florida
- In office November 21, 1991 – March 25, 1999
- Preceded by: Jeff Koons
- Succeeded by: Joel T. Daves III

Personal details
- Born: June 5, 1946 (age 80) Lebanon, Tennessee, U.S.
- Education: University of Florida
- Profession: Politician

Nancy Malley Graham (born Nancy Carol Roskam; June 5, 1946) is an American educator, lawyer, and politician. She formerly served as West Palm Beach, Florida's first strong mayor from 1991 to 1999. Although the office of mayor of West Palm Beach is officially nonpartisan, she was a member of the Republican Party during her tenure. Prior to holding a public office, Graham graduated with a Juris Doctor degree from the University of Florida in 1981. Moving to West Palm Beach two years later, Graham served as a member of several law firms in the 1980s in the West Palm Beach area. She was elected city commissioner in 1988 and promoted to vice mayor in 1989, but soon resigned to avoid a potential conflict of interest with her law firm. Following a brief return to private life, Graham successfully campaigned for the city's 1991 mayoral election, the first direct election for that office in several decades.

Graham became the first strong mayor of West Palm Beach upon her inauguration on November 21, 1991. She is most often recognized for revitalizing downtown West Palm Beach, especially for improvements to Clematis Street and the construction of CityPlace (now known as The Square), which opened about a year after she left office in 1999. After again briefly returning to the private sector, she served a short stint on the city's Downtown Development Authority board. In 2005, she moved to San Diego to become executive director of Centre City Development Corporation, but a misdemeanor conflict of interest conviction resulted in her being fined by the state of California and the city of San Diego. She also taught business law and political science at colleges in California and Tennessee before returning to Florida in 2016 and then back to West Palm Beach in 2017.

== Early life and education ==
Graham was born on June 5, 1946, in Lebanon, Tennessee, to a poor family of six children. In addition to her hometown, she grew up in San Diego, California, and moved there at age 18. In San Diego, Graham worked as a secretary and met her first husband, Robert Malley. The couple moved to Jacksonville, Florida, and had three children – Susan, Randall, and Robert. However, Susan died shortly after birth and Randall, who suffered from a severe intellectual disability, died in 1985 at age 15. Graham and Malley divorced in 1976, re-married a few months later, and then divorced again after about two years. Graham attended the Fredric G. Levin College of Law – the law school at the University of Florida – and earned a Juris Doctor degree in 1981. She moved to West Palm Beach in 1983 and worked at three prominent law firms in the city over the next several years. After marrying another man, Robert Graham, they adopted a girl named Ashley. The couple divorced in 1986.

== City commissioner and mayorship ==
Graham entered public office for the first time in 1988 as a city commissioner. During the campaign, she advocated for stronger accountability between commissioners and residents and supported City Manager Paul Steinbrenner's progress in modernizing the city operations. Graham raised $16,760. On March 8, she easily defeated her opponents, receiving 6,334 votes, versus 1,679 votes for stockbroker Robert G. Murray and 1,622 votes for language consultant Ketly Blaise. Upon taking office, Graham succeeded Helen Wilkes, a city commissioner who served as the first female Mayor of West Palm Beach. During her tenure, Graham focused on creating drug-free zones, demolishing drug houses, and encouraging the city to hire a more diverse workforce. In 1989, Graham switched from the Democratic Party to the Republican Party. That same year, the city commission promoted Graham to vice mayor on March 30, while James O. Poole became mayor. However, she resigned from her position later that year to avoid a potential conflict of interest with her law firm.

She briefly returned to private life. However, after a referendum allowing the direct election of a strong mayor succeeded in March 1991, Graham declared her candidacy for mayor, with the election scheduled on November 5. In addition to Graham, other candidates included attorney and former state representative Joel T. Daves III, senior city planner Jim Exline, Josephine Stenson Grund, property management company owner and former mayor Michael D. Hyman, and former Palm Beach County commissioner Bill Medlen. None of the candidates received a majority of the vote. Thus, Graham and Hyman advanced to a run-off election after receiving 33.4% and 24.9% of the vote, respectively. In the run-off held on November 19, Graham prevailed over Hyman by a margin of 56.8%–44.2%.

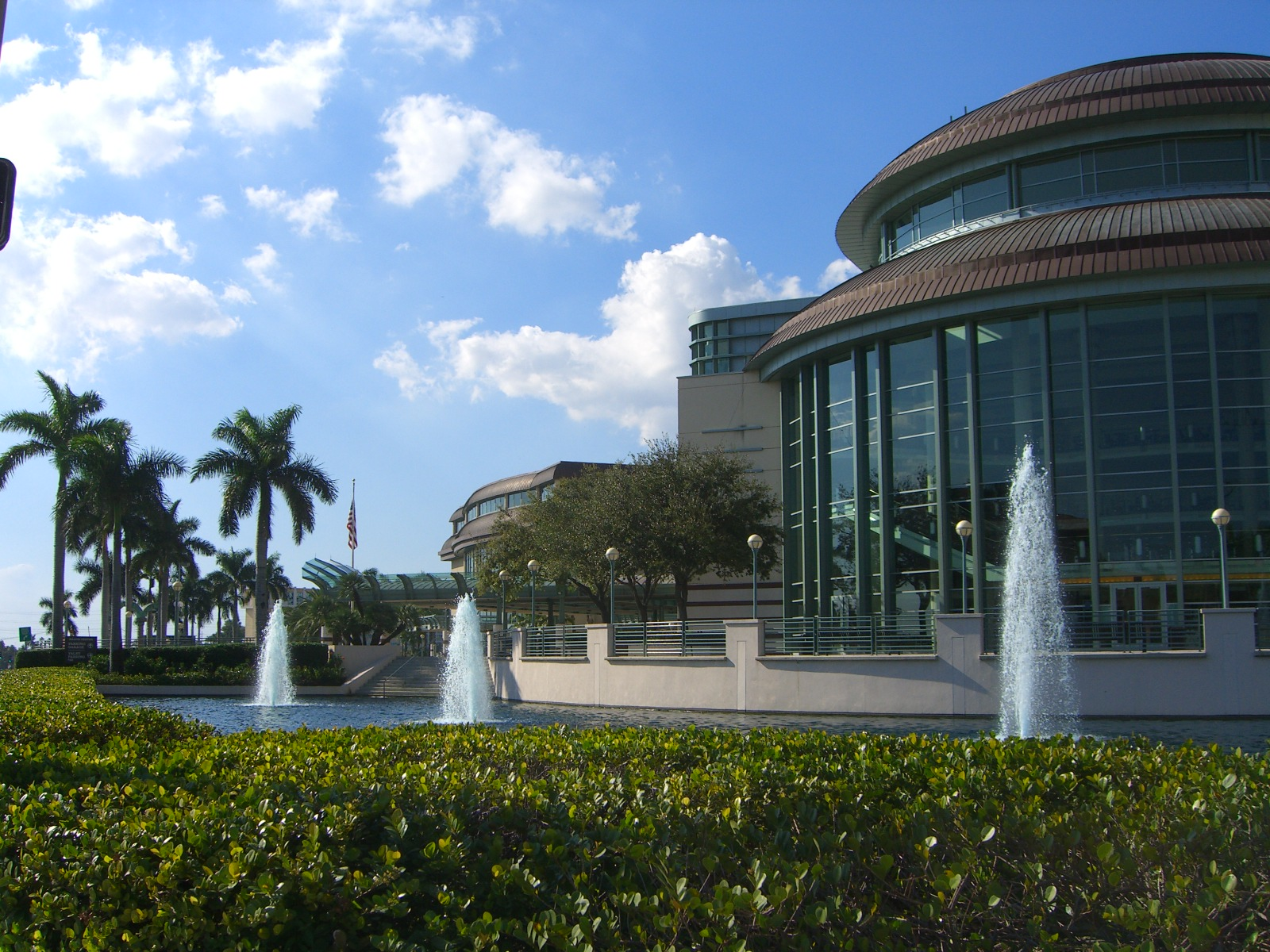
Raymond F. Kravis Center for the Performing Arts, which opened in 1992

She was sworn in on November 21, becoming the first strong and popularly elected mayor since 1919. Among her first acts of business, she called for the resignation of members of several city boards, particularly the Downtown Development Authority Board. Upon taking office, Graham assumed responsibility of the city's $9 million debt, which was partly reduced by levying fees on the town of Palm Beach for using West Palm Beach's water, a service originally free-of-charge. During the campaign, she vowed for improvements to downtown. Graham inherited a downtown with a 77 acres (31 ha) area flattened in 1989 for a large construction project, known as the Downtown/Uptown project, which the buyers subsequently abandoned during the next few years. Additionally, many store owners left and moved to the malls, while streets were widened to allow cars to speed through the area.

In November 1992, the Raymond F. Kravis Center for the Performing Arts opened debt-free, an effort led by Alexander W. Dreyfoos, Jr. Over the years, the opening of the Kravis Center would have a domino effect in that projects such as CityPlace, Palm Beach County Convention Center, and the relocation of Dreyfoos School of the Arts to the former site of Palm Beach High School (later Twin Lakes High School) followed.

Much of the improvements in downtown began after a $18.2 million bond was issued to the city in October 1992, with $4 million allotted to the waterfront. On March 9, 1993, voters decided by a 67.5%–32.5% margin to give Graham more power. The charter revision, which became effective on April 1, gave her the authority to prepare the city budget and hire and fire any department heads, while also eliminating the city manager position. Also that day, Graham's staunchest critic, Robbie Little, lost his seat on the city commission. City Manager Ron Schutta resigned from his position and was temporarily replaced by Assistant City Manager Joe Gallegos as city administrator, until Graham hired Mike Wright on December 1. In April, a public forum on redesigning downtown began, hosted by the architecture firm Duany Plater-Zyberk & Company.

Among the first projects was the beautification of Clematis Street, completed in December 1993 after the replacement of benches, sidewalks, and trees over the previous six months. The project resulted in several businesses moving to Clematis Street. Architect Dan Kiley was hired for several of the waterfront projects, including building an amphitheater, remodeling the library, and designing an interactive water fountain at Flagler Park. The plan for building the amphitheater required the city to spend about $1 million for construction, as well as $171,400 for the demolition of a Holiday Inn. Officials selected the Holiday Inn as the site for the amphitheater because the building had remained vacant and gutted since 1986, while plans for reselling or remodeling the hotel for a different use fell through. A nearby bank agreed to finance most of the cost of purchasing the building, allowing the city to acquire the hotel for only $1,000. The city hired Controlled Demolition, Inc. for the demolition, which was scheduled for December 31, 1993, 10 seconds before midnight. More than 20,000 people attended the explosion event, which was triggered by about 300 sticks of dynamite. Graham sold $25 tickets for a close-up view of the explosion. Revenue from tickets and donations totaled almost $1 million.

The city commission passed an equal opportunity ordinance on September 12, 1994, which prohibited discrimination based on race, national origin, religion, sex, sexual orientation, age, disability, and martial or familial status for housing, employment, or public accommodations. Objections arose regarding the inclusion of sexual orientation, leading to a referendum by voters to decide whether the ordinance should remain as it had passed. Graham publicly endorsed keeping sexual orientation on the list. In the election, held on January 10, 1995, voters decided to keep sexual orientation on the list by a margin of 3,815 to 3,008. About two months later, on March 14, 1995, Graham easily won re-election as mayor. She defeated her only opponent, city commissioner Sarah Brack Nuckles, by a vote of 5,935 to 1,852 votes – a margin of about 76%–24%. Graham carried 44 out of 47 precincts, while none of the precincts she failed to win had more than 10 voters. She raised $66,827 for the campaign.

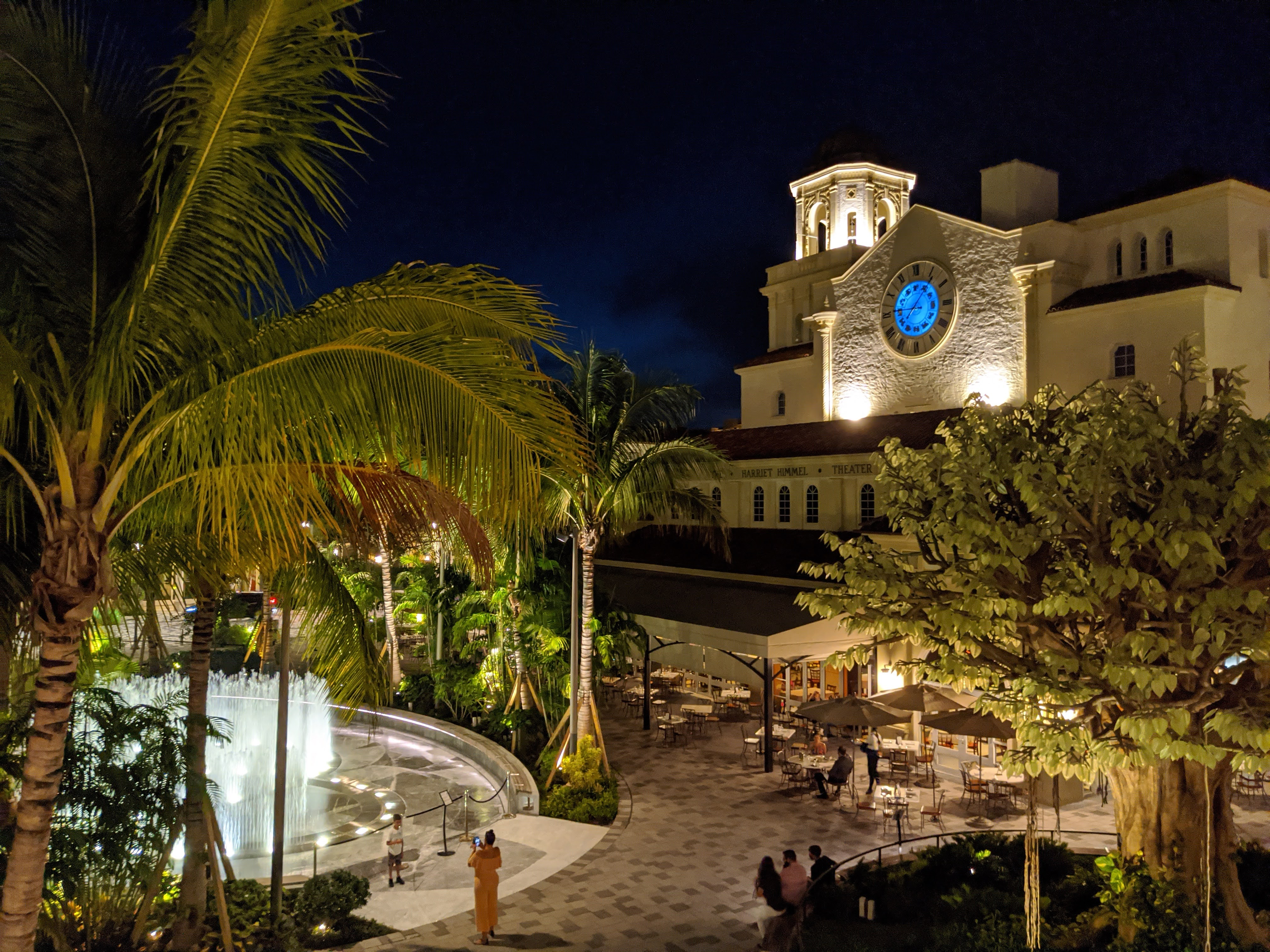
The Square (pictured in 2020), which opened in 2000 as CityPlace

The city commission made a decision regarding future use of the site of the formerly proposed Downtown/Uptown project in October 1996. Commissioners voted 5-1 to approve the $375 million project called CityPlace, proposed by Himmel & Co., the Related Cos., the O'Connor Group, and the Related Group. Their plan included an 18 to 24 screen movie theater and a number of restaurants, upscale stores, apartments, and office buildings. Overall, the city approved about 2,000,000 sq ft (190,000 m^{2}) of land development. In return, the city agreed to invest $75 million for construction of streets, parking garages, and plazas, with $20 million already borrowed for purchasing land. Construction began in 1998, with stores expected to open in November 1999, though CityPlace would actually open in October 2000.

In July 1997, a $30 million windfall for improving neighborhoods and parks was created after the board heading the city's pension voted to liquidate the pension plan. Graham, a proponent of the liquidation, announced that she and city commissioners planned to spend the money on renovating parks, roads, and street lights, as well as the construction of two new fire stations. To gain additional revenue for the city, Graham proposed selling the city auditorium and stadium to the Jehovah's Witnesses for $12.5 million. On April 28, 1998, residents chose to approve the sale by a vote of 52%-48%.

After speculation about running for a third term, Graham announced on November 20, 1998, that she would not seek re-election in the 1999 mayoral election. In early March 1999, the city commemorated her tenure as mayor by unveiling a monument at the fountain built on Clematis Street in 1994, which dedicated it as Nancy M. Graham Centennial Square. She was succeeded by Daves on March 25, 1999.

For her efforts, Graham received a number of awards during her tenure as Mayor of West Palm Beach. These included the Executive Women's Leadership Award for the Public Sector in 1992, Leadership Excellence Award from the American Business Women's Association in 1992, Leadership Palm Beach County's President's Award for Outstanding Community Leadership in 1993, the Palm Beach County Chapter of the National Business and Professional Women's "Breaking the Glass Ceiling–Women Who Made a Difference" Award in 1994, and was an honoree for Public Official of the Year by Governing magazine in 1998.

Despite being registered with the Republican Party during her mayorship, Graham endorsed incumbent Florida governor Lawton Chiles, a Democrat, over Republican Jeb Bush for re-election in 1994. Two years later, she endorsed incumbent President Bill Clinton for re-election over Bob Dole during a campaign event in which first lady Hillary Clinton spoke at the Armory Art Center in West Palm Beach on October 1, 1996. However, she supported Bush over Democrat lieutenant governor Buddy MacKay during the 1998 gubernatorial election.

== Post-mayorship ==
After leaving office, Graham soon took a job with Watermark Communities Inc. In 2004, mayor Lois Frankel appointed Graham to the Downtown Development Authority. Graham resigned after only one year, citing her mother's ailing health. However, Frankel later stated it was because of a conflict of interest with The Related Companies, developer of CityPlace, while Graham responded by claiming that Frankel conducting "backroom deals" was the actual reason she resigned. Later in 2005, Graham moved back to San Diego to become executive director of Centre City Development Corp. Controversy surrounding her involvement with The Related Companies continued in San Diego, California. NK Ventures, owned by Graham, received $3.5 million in 2005 from Lennar and The Related Companies for the development of the Moorings at Lantana in Lantana, Florida. She failed to disclose this information prior to entering negotiations with the two companies for a major project in San Diego in 2007. Two years later, Graham was charged with misdemeanor conflict of interest. In exchange for a non-contest plea, under which she agreed to not hold elected office in California for three years, Graham was fined $3,300 by the state and $32,000 by the San Diego Ethics Committee.

Graham then returned to her hometown of Lebanon, Tennessee. A late 2011 article in The Palm Beach Post indicated that she taught business law and political science as an adjunct professor at an undisclosed private college, before later teaching law at a university in California. Thereafter, Graham moved to North Florida in 2016, one year before relocating back to West Palm Beach.

== See also ==
- History of West Palm Beach, Florida
- Urban decay
- Urban renewal
