= Hibiscus Apartments =

- U.S. National Register of Historic Places
- Location within Florida Location within the United States
- Location: West Palm Beach, Florida
- Coordinates: 26°42′31″N 80°3′30″W
- Architectural style: Colonial Revival
- NRHP reference No.: 84000935
- Added to NRHP: May 10, 1984

The Hibiscus Apartments, also known as the Hibiscus Garden Apartments, was a historic building site in West Palm Beach, Florida. Built in 1926, the 3-story, 56-unit apartment was constructed by Chalker, Lund & Crittenden and designed by architect William Manly King. Located at 619 Hibiscus Street, John R. Beacham, a mayor of West Palm Beach and Florida Senator who served as the president of the Florida Senate, purchased a unit in 1939, where he accommodated guests including President Franklin D. Roosevelt, Congressman Claude Pepper, and Governor Spessard Holland.

The building was added to the U.S. National Register of Historic Places (NRHP) on May 10, 1984. At the time, the structure was West Palm Beach's only remaining Spanish Colonial Revival-style apartment building. However, arson incidents in 1989 caused severe damage to the building, enough that it was demolished, leading to its removal from the NRHP. When the CityPlace shopping district opened in 2000, a Macy's occupied the site where the Hibiscus Apartments once existed. However, the Macy's store was demolished in 2018, and a 21-story apartment building named The Laurel was built in its place. The Laurel opened in 2024.

== History and description ==
Despite the 1920s land boom leading to a rapid turnover in ownership of plots in West Palm Beach, Florida, lots 14, 15, and part of 13 of the Highland Park Addition remained undeveloped for several years. Hibiscus Holding Company purchased this land in May 1925 and received a building permit the following month for a construction project to be undertaken by Chalker, Lund & Crittenden, described by Michael H. Rupert and Michael Zimny of the Florida Division of Archives as "one of the best and most prestigious builders in the West Palm Beach area." Architect William Manly King designed the structure. Originally intended to be seven-stories tall, a railroad embargo led to a shortage of building materials. Consequently, construction ceased after only three-stories were built.

The U-shaped, 3-story, 57-unit Spanish Colonial Revival-style building opened in 1926. In the immediate aftermath of the 1928 Okeechobee hurricane, "the Hibiscus apartments were filled to overflowing," according to The Palm Beach Post due to accommodating people rendered homeless by the storm. John R. Beacham, a mayor of West Palm Beach and Florida Senator who served as the president of the Florida Senate, purchased a unit in 1939 and lived there until he died in 1950. Among Beacham's guests were President Franklin D. Roosevelt, Congressman Claude Pepper, and Governor Spessard Holland. On May 10, 1984, the Hibiscus Apartments were listed on the National Register of Historic Places (NRHP). Noting its importance, Rubert and Zimny stated, "Hibiscus Garden Apartments is the last surviving apartment building built in the Spanish Colonial Revival style in West Palm Beach and may also have been the first.", but ultimately concluded that the latter claim was not possible to verify.

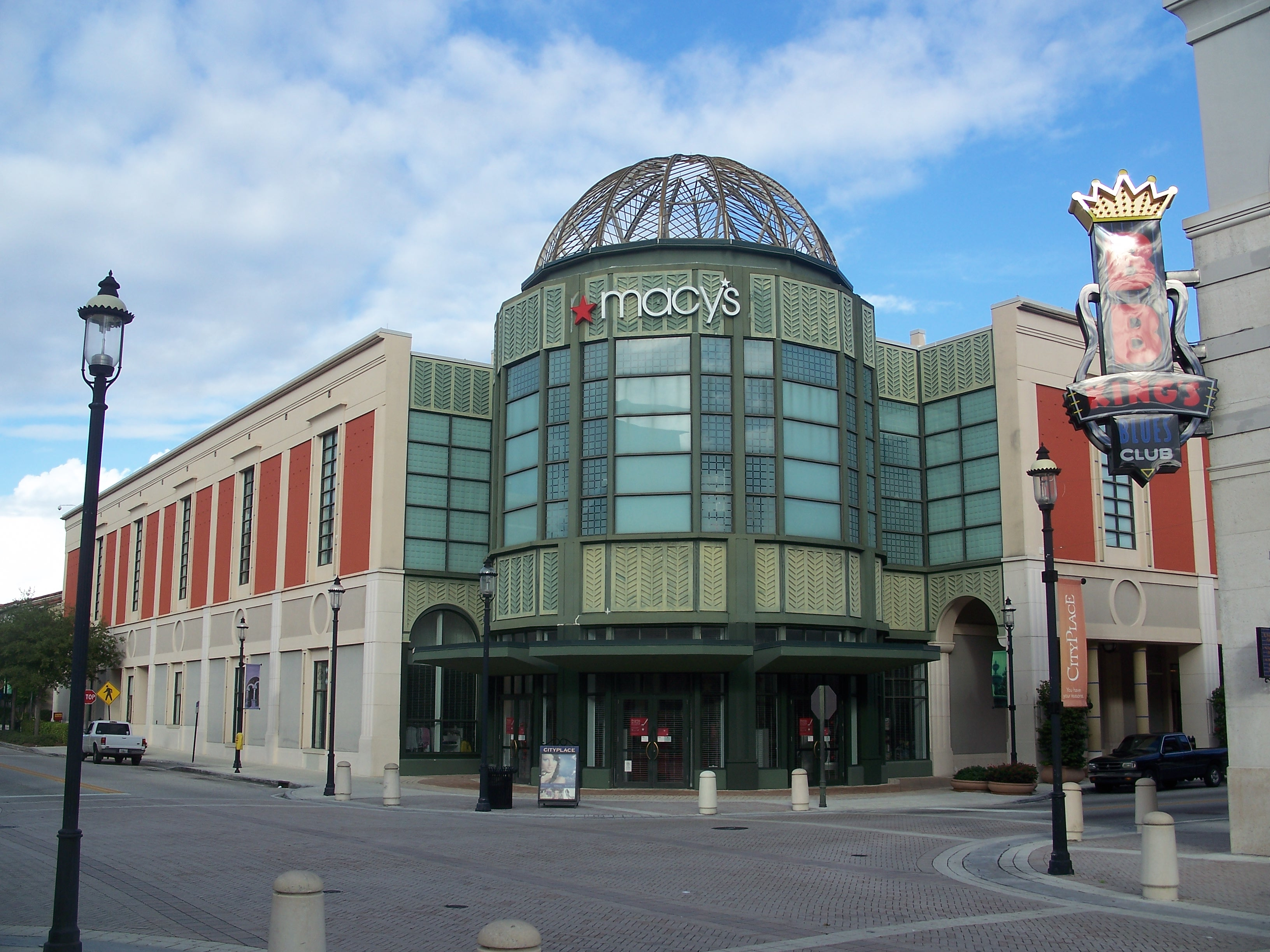
Macy's, where the apartments used to be

Between the late 1980s and early 1990s, private investors David C. Paladino and Henry J. Rolfs began working on Uptown/Downtown, a downtown revitalization project that ultimately led to the purchasing and razing of over 300 properties in the vicinity of Okeechobee Boulevard. Paladino and Rolfs initially intended to spare the Hibiscus Apartments from demolition. However, three separate arson attacks in 1989 severely damaged the structure. Bulldozers then began demolishing the remnants of the structure a few weeks later. Consequently, the Hibiscus Apartments was removed from the NRHP, but not until January 4, 2012. By the early 1990s, Paladino and Rolfs due to an exhaustion of personal fortune, defaulted loans, foreclosures, lawsuits, and a recession.

However, in 1996, the West Palm Beach city commission approved another downtown revitalization project in the same area, which would be known as CityPlace. In 1999, the developers of CityPlace and Macy's struck a deal to open a 110,000 square feet (10,000 m^{2}) store within CityPlace. By that time, downtown West Palm Beach had not had a department store since Burdines closed about 20 years earlier. CityPlace and the Macy's store both opened in 2000, with the latter being located specifically on the former site of the Hibiscus Apartments. The Macy's store remained there until its closure in 2017. While briefly hosting Downton Abbey: The Exhibition, CityPlace's developer, Related Companies, announced that the building would be demolished. A 21-story apartment building named The Laurel was built in its place. The Laurel opened in 2024.

== See also ==
- National Register of Historic Places listings in Palm Beach County, Florida
