= Hibiscus (disambiguation) =

Hibiscus is a genus of flowering plants.

Hibiscus may also refer to:

== Places ==
- Hibiscus Apartments
- Hibiscus Coast
- Hibiscus Island
- Hibiscus Park, a public housing estate in Kwai Chung, Hong Kong

== Ships ==
- HMS Hibiscus, two vessels of the British Royal Navy
- USS Hibiscus (1864), a United States Navy ship

== Other uses ==
- Hibiscus (entertainer) (1949–1982), American actor
- Hibiscus (restaurant), a restaurant in England
- Hibiscus tea, tea made from the flowers of hibiscus sabdariffa
- Hibiscus, a 2005 album by Stonefree
- "Hibiscus", a 2007 song by Moka Only from the album Vermilion
