= Connie Mack (disambiguation) =

Connie Mack (1862–1956) was an American baseball manager, player, owner and Hall of Famer

Connie Mack may also refer to:

- Connie Mack III (born 1940), U.S. Representative (1983–1989), U.S. Senator (1989–2001) from Florida (grandson of Connie Mack)
- Connie Mack IV (born 1967), U.S. Representative from Florida, 2005–2013 (son of Connie Mack III)

== See also ==
- Connie Mack Field, West Palm Beach, Florida
- Connie Mack Stadium or Shibe Park, baseball park in Philadelphia
- Connie Mak, Hong Kong singer, also called Kitman Mak
