= CityPlace (Downtown West Palm Beach) =

Lifestyle center in Florida, US

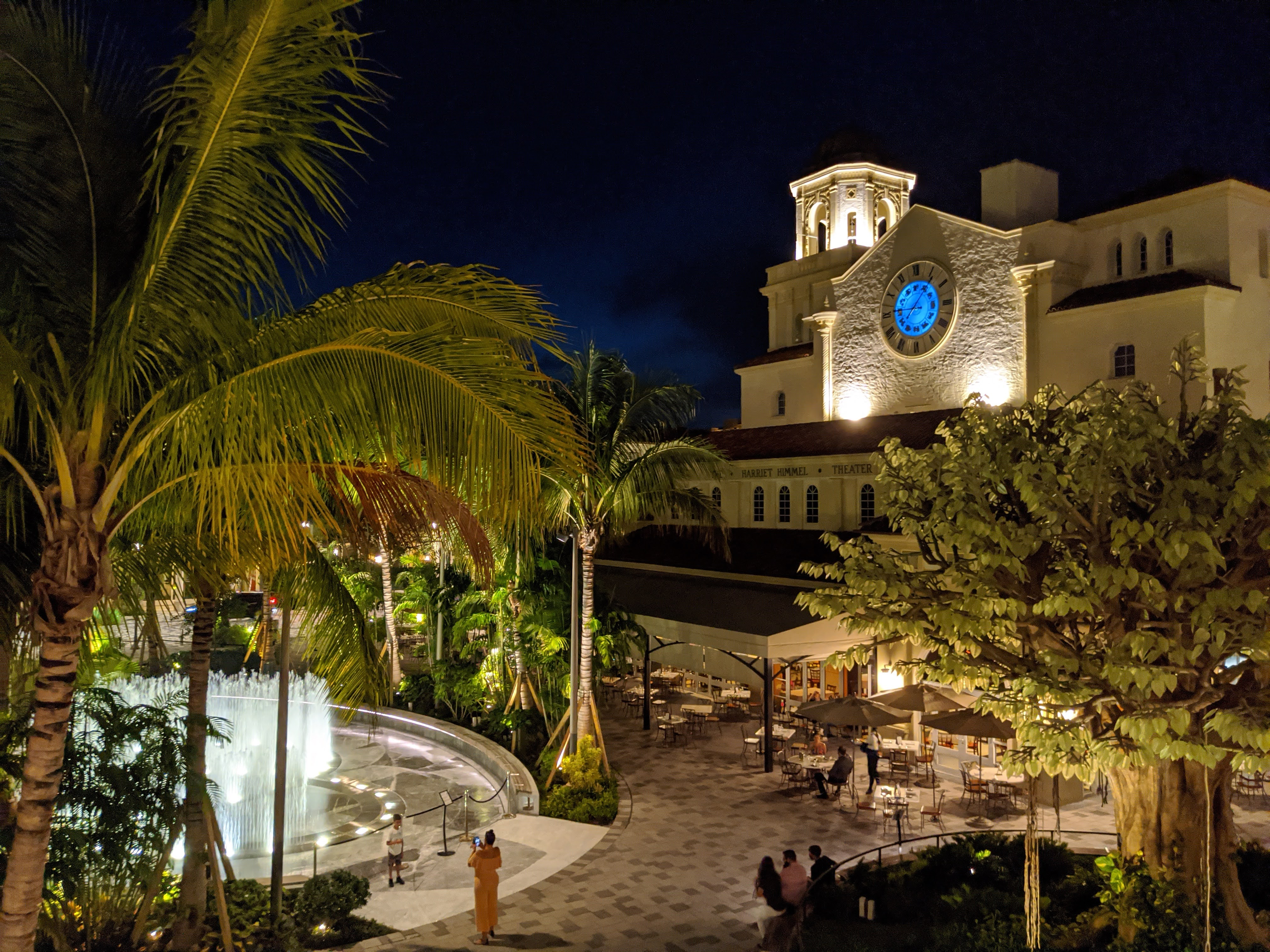
- CityPlace (then Rosemary Square) at night, July 2020
- Location: West Palm Beach, Florida, U.S.
- Coordinates: 26.708442°N 80.056534°W
- Address: 700 South Rosemary Avenue
- Opened: October 27, 2000
- Developer: The Palladium Co.
- Manager: The Related Companies, L. P.
- Owner: The Related Companies, L. P.
- Architect: Elkus/Manfredi Architects, Ltd.
- Num. of stores: 60+
- Num. of anchor tenants: 4 (3 open, 1 vacant)
- Floor area: 600,000 square feet (56,000 m^{2})
- Floors: 2
- Website: cityplace.com

CityPlace (formerly known as Rosemary Square and The Square) is an upscale lifestyle center in downtown West Palm Beach, Florida, along South Rosemary Avenue. Considered a New Urbanist mixed-use development, CityPlace is architecturally composed of Mediterranean and Venetian elements. The 600,000-square-foot (56,000 m^{2})-center constitutes several city blocks and contains more than 60 restaurants and stores, as well as rental apartments, condos, and offices.

Opening in October 2000, the property is primarily credited for the urban renaissance of West Palm Beach, which had previously been notorious for crime, poverty, and vacant and dilapidated businesses and houses.

LA Fitness and Publix are the center's anchors. The third anchor was Macy's, which closed in 2017. Two movie theaters, AMC Parisian 20 and IMAX, were also on the property, though they have both since closed. Hotspots include Cheesecake Factory, Sloan's Ice Cream, and Starbucks. Apart from shopping, dining, and cinema, the center is now at the forefront of West Palm Beach's entertainment complementing establishments located on nearby Clematis Street.

The Raymond F. Kravis Center for the Performing Arts and Alexander W. Dreyfoos, Jr. School of the Arts are located within walking distance to CityPlace, as is the Palm Beach County Convention Center. An early-century trolleybus circles downtown between CityPlace and Clematis.

== History ==
=== Prior to completion ===
By the 1980s, downtown West Palm Beach had acquired a reputation for crime, poverty, and vacant and dilapidated businesses and houses. United States senator Lawton Chiles referred to the area as a "war zone", while local politicians were not optimistic about the future of downtown. West Palm Beach had the highest crime rate for a city of its size in the late 1980s. Crack USA: County Under Siege, a 1989 documentary film about the crack epidemic, was filmed in West Palm Beach.

In 1986, private investors David C. Paladino and Henry J. Rolfs presented a 20-year, $433 million project to revitalize the western side of downtown, in the vicinity of where CityPlace is presently located. The proposal, known as Uptown/Downtown, included plans for 3,700,000 square feet (340,000 m^{2}) of office space, 190,000 square feet (18,000 m^{2}) of retail space, 800 hotel rooms, and 700 residential units. Paladino and Rolfs purchased and razed properties across 77 acres (31 ha) of land – more than 300 properties – adjacent to Okeechobee Boulevard for about $40 million, with the exception of the historic First United Methodist Church (built in 1926), which later became the Harriet Himmel Theater. The duo donated 5 acres (2.0 ha) of land for development of the Kravis Center for the Performing Arts, which opened in 1992.

However, by the early 1990s, the project was discontinued after Rolfs exhausted his personal fortune and due to defaulted loans, foreclosures, lawsuits, and a recession. Then-Mayor of West Palm Beach Nancy M. Graham and the city acquired the land in 1995 using a multimillion-dollar loan and eminent domain. On August 1, 1996, three proposals for developing the former Uptown/Downtown project area were presented to the city of West Palm Beach – CityPlace, KravisPlace, and Millennium. Each proposal called for keeping the historical church and constructing hundreds of thousands of square feet for stores, hundreds or tens of thousands of square feet for a movie theater, tens of thousands of square feet for restaurants, hundreds of thousands of square feet for office space, and thousands of hotel rooms and apartment units. The teams planning the proposals were scheduled to present further details in early October. However, on September 30, the team bidding for Millennium withdrew.

The city commission made their final decision regarding future use of the site of the formerly proposed Downtown/Uptown project in October 1996. Commissioners voted 5-1 to approve the $375 million project called CityPlace, proposed by Himmel & Co., the Related Cos., the O'Connor Group, and the Related Group. Their plan included an 18 to 24 screen movie theater and a number of restaurants, upscale stores, apartments, and office buildings. Overall, about 2,000,000 sq ft (190,000 m^{2}) of land development was approved. In return, the city agreed to invest $75 million for the construction of streets, parking garages, and plazas, with $20 million already borrowed for purchasing land.

Construction began on May 1, 1998, during a gala featuring speakers including the project leaders, Mayor Nancy Graham, and Congressmen Mark Foley and Clay Shaw. Initial rates for tenants ranged from $40-$45 per square foot, a smaller amount than at malls and places such as Worth Avenue, but higher than rates for space on nearby Clematis Street. The project was expected to be completed by November 1999, though CityPlace would actually open in October 2000.

=== Since completion ===
CityPlace opened to the public on October 27, 2000, with 31 stores and 1 restaurant opening during the first weekend. Many other stores and restaurants were expected to open by mid-December, bringing the total number of stores and restaurants to about 70. The original anchors for CityPlace were Barnes & Noble, Macy's, Muvico Parisian 20 and IMAX theater. Wild Oats Markets was also planned as an original anchor. However, financial problems halted construction in 2000. CityPlace filed suit to terminate their lease, with both parties settling a few weeks later. On August 20, 2001, Wild Oats Markets was replaced by Publix as an anchor, which opened in January 2002.

Early on, CityPlace sought to attract many high-end stores as tenants, though emphasis shifted to home furnishings during the housing bubble. By the Great Recession, the focus turned heavily toward dining and entertainment establishments becoming tenants.

Related Companies submitted plans for and gained approval from the city commission in November 2018 for transforming the building into a 21-story apartment building, which would add 300-400 new residential units to CityPlace. Related Companies intends to invest almost $550 million for the construction of new restaurants, a new mixed-use luxury residential tower, and a new hotel, as well as an office tower containing 300,000 sq ft (28,000 m^{2}) of space. Some asphalt roads were replaced with gray and white pavers and converted into pedestrian walking areas.

In May 2023, the AMC Theatre closed and was demolished four months later, along with Copper Blues and Palm Beach Improv. The Related Companies intended to construct two office towers on the former site of those buildings.

== Concept ==
The shopping center is the epitome of a New Urbanist mixed-use development. Most of its architecture is West European-inspired, with mainly Mediterranean and Venetian elements. However the CityPlace Tower constructed in 2007, and associated with the original property, is postmodern. This tower has been downtown West Palm Beach's first office development in over twenty years. Later phases of CityPlace, including Montecito Palm Beach (formerly called The Mark at CityPlace) and CityPlace South Tower, retain loyalty to the original development's architecture. Excluding these more recent additions, CityPlace proper contains 600 private residences.

The Harriet Himmel Theater, a former Methodist church, is located at the center of CityPlace. Built in 1926 in the Spanish Colonial Revival style, it has undergone a six million dollar restoration, and serves today as a cultural center. Surrounding squares, arcades, and promenades feature 2,000-square-foot (190 m^{2}) water fountains and lush landscaping.

== Anchors ==
- Publix; 24,000 square feet (2,200 m^{2})
- LA Fitness
- Restoration Hardware

== Former anchors ==
- FAO Schwarz (closed in 2004, became Panera Bread and Taverna Opa; 16,000 square feet (1,500 m^{2})
- Barnes & Noble Booksellers (now closed, became Perigold)
- Muvico Parisian 20 and IMAX (converted to AMC Theatres in 2017)
- Macy's (demolished 2019)
- AMC Parisian 20 and IMAX; 92,000 square feet (8,500 m^{2}) (demolished in September 2023)

== Gallery ==
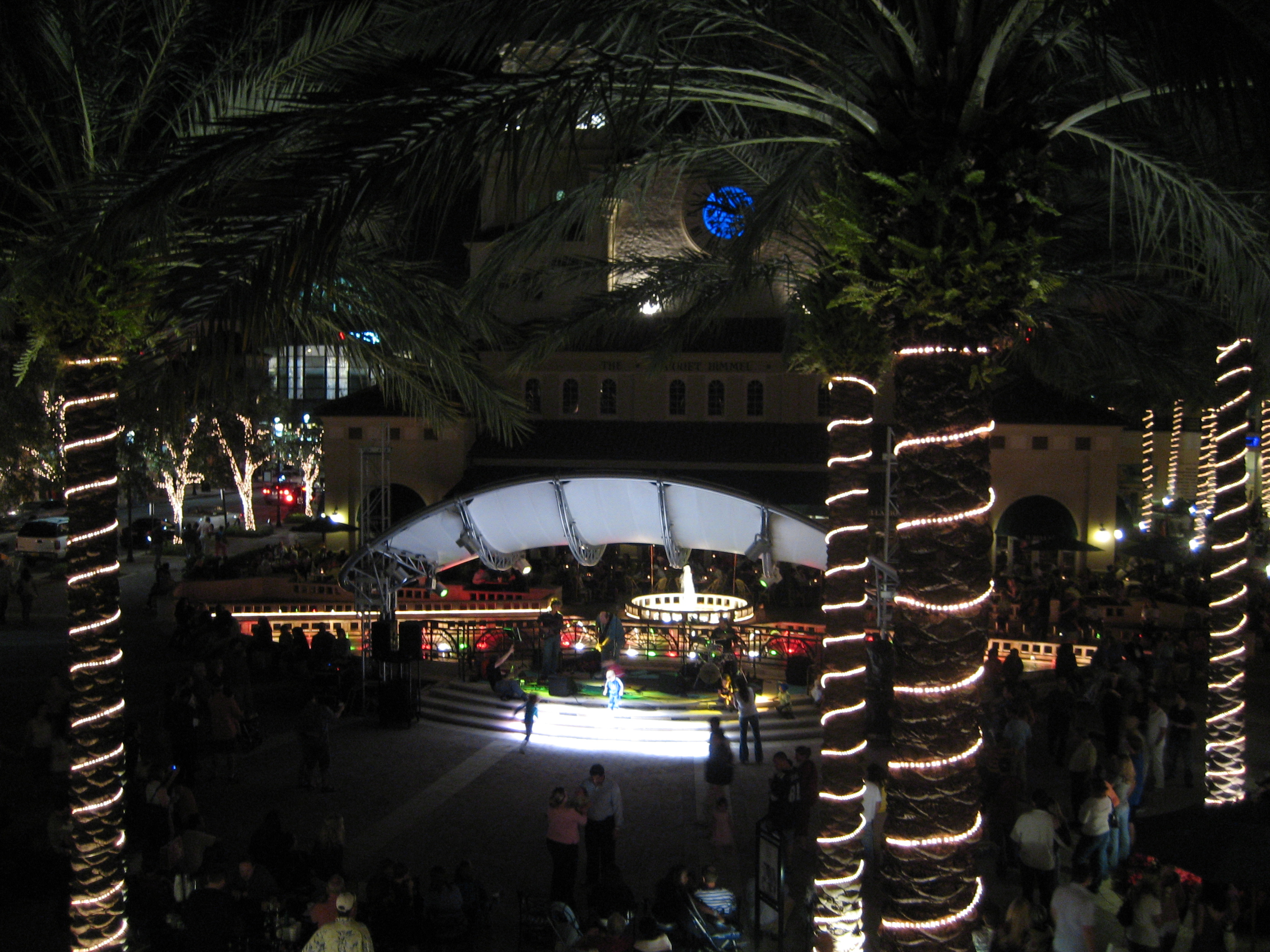
Live entertainment on a weekend night

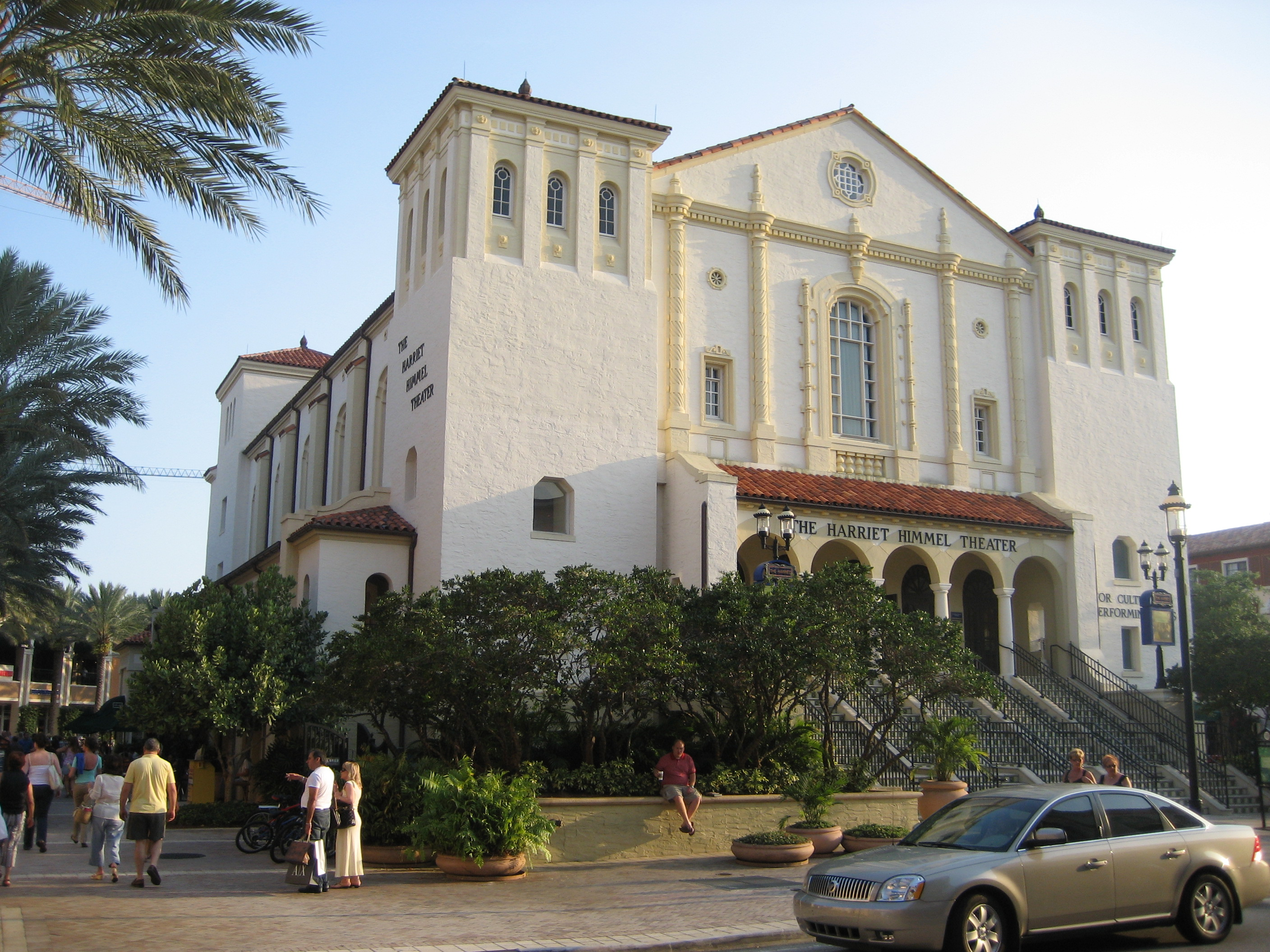
The street entrance to the Harriet Himmel Theater and Christ Fellowship

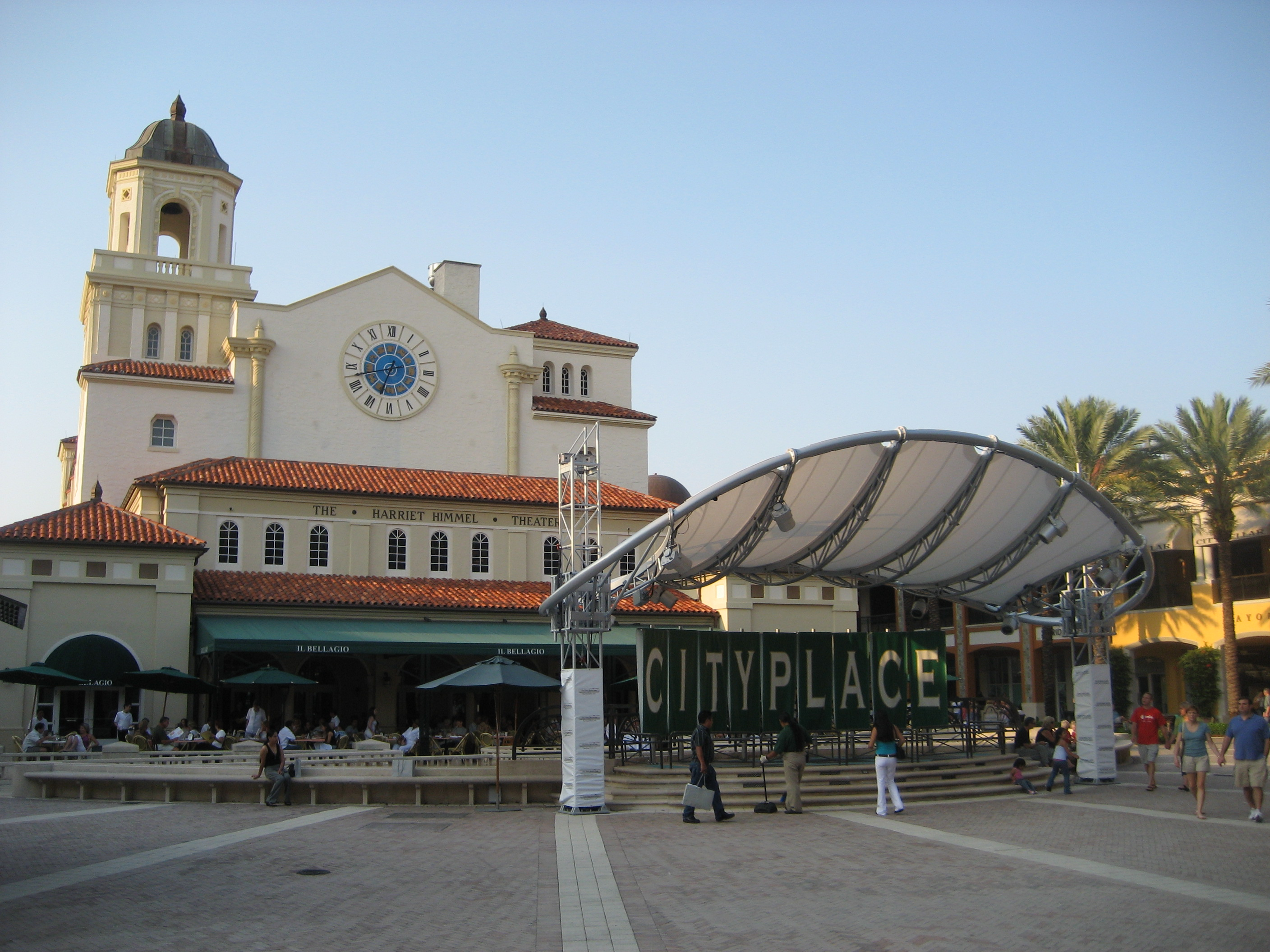
The back of the theater, featuring an entertainment stage where the show takes place.

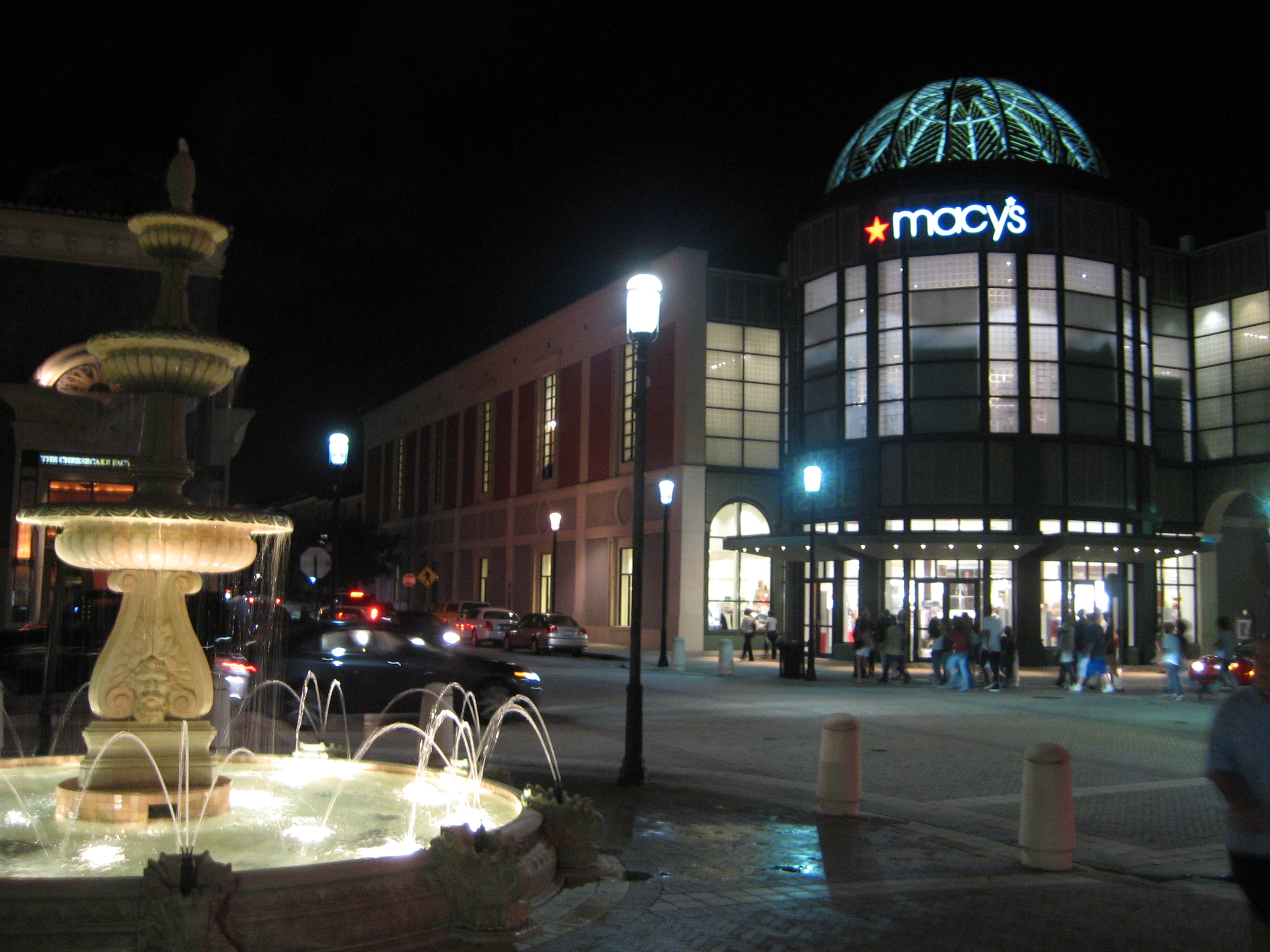
Macy's, one of the anchors of CityPlace that closed.

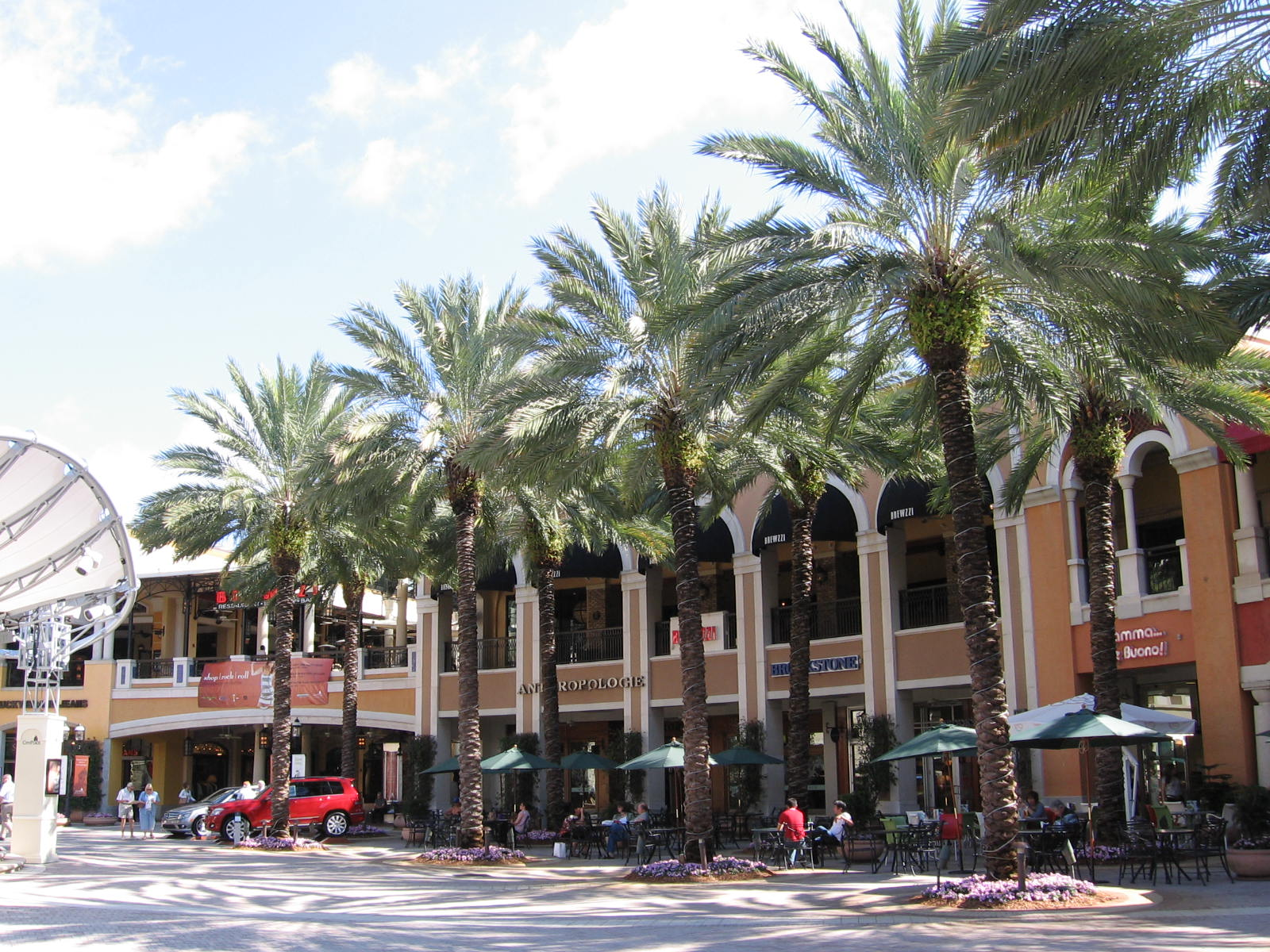
CityPlace (Jan. 2009)

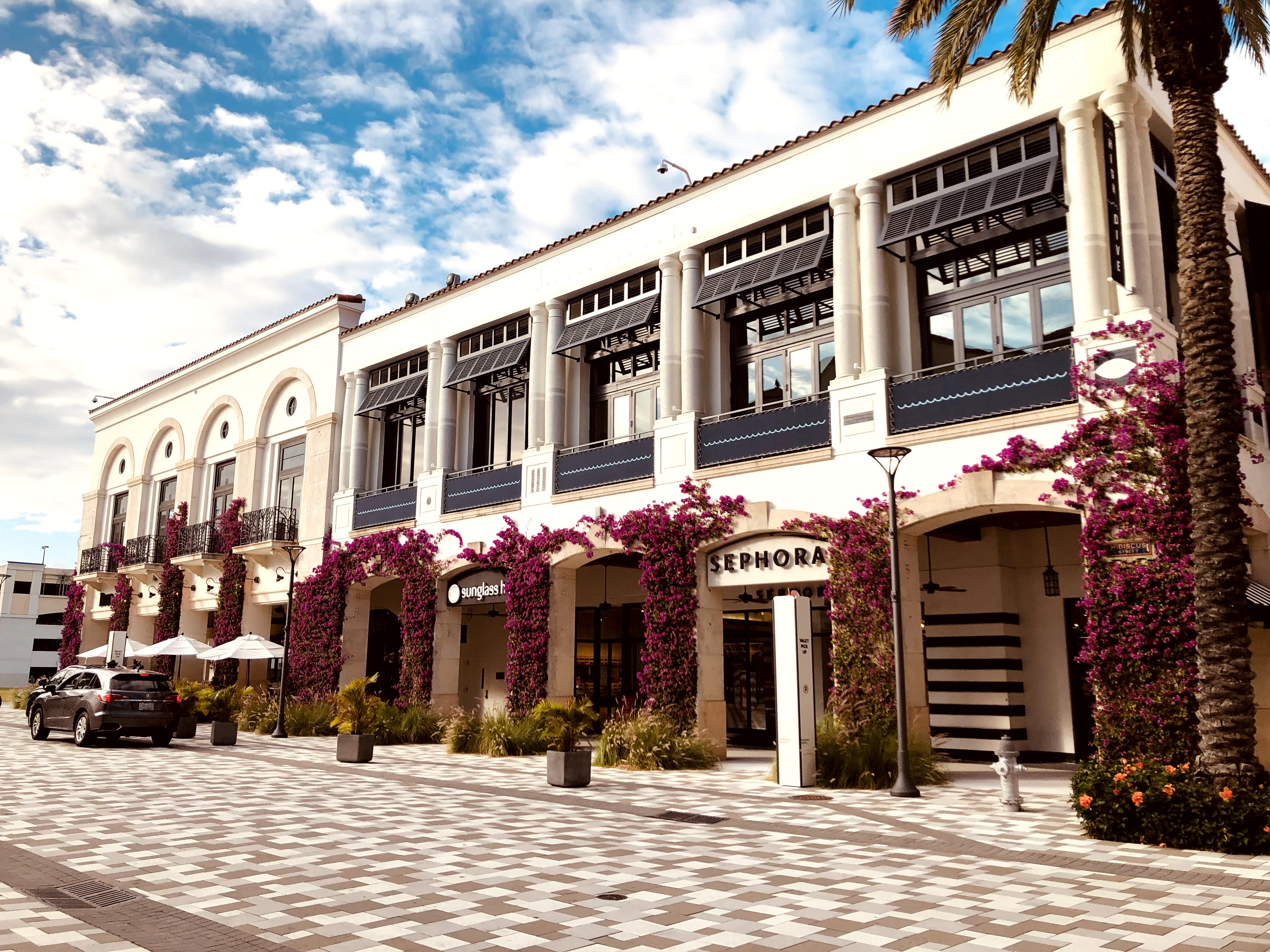
Building at the north side (2021)
