= Old Jupiter School =

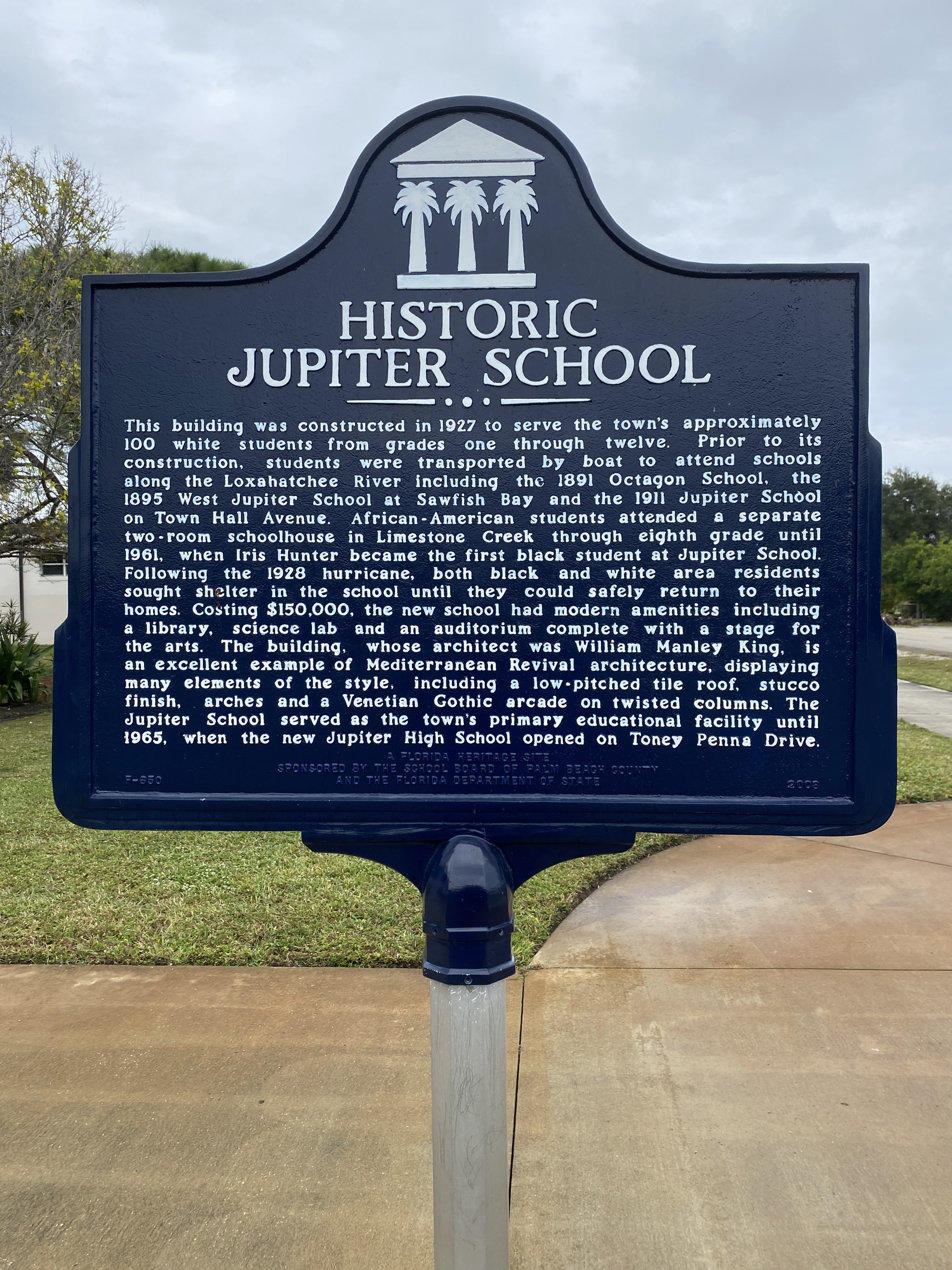

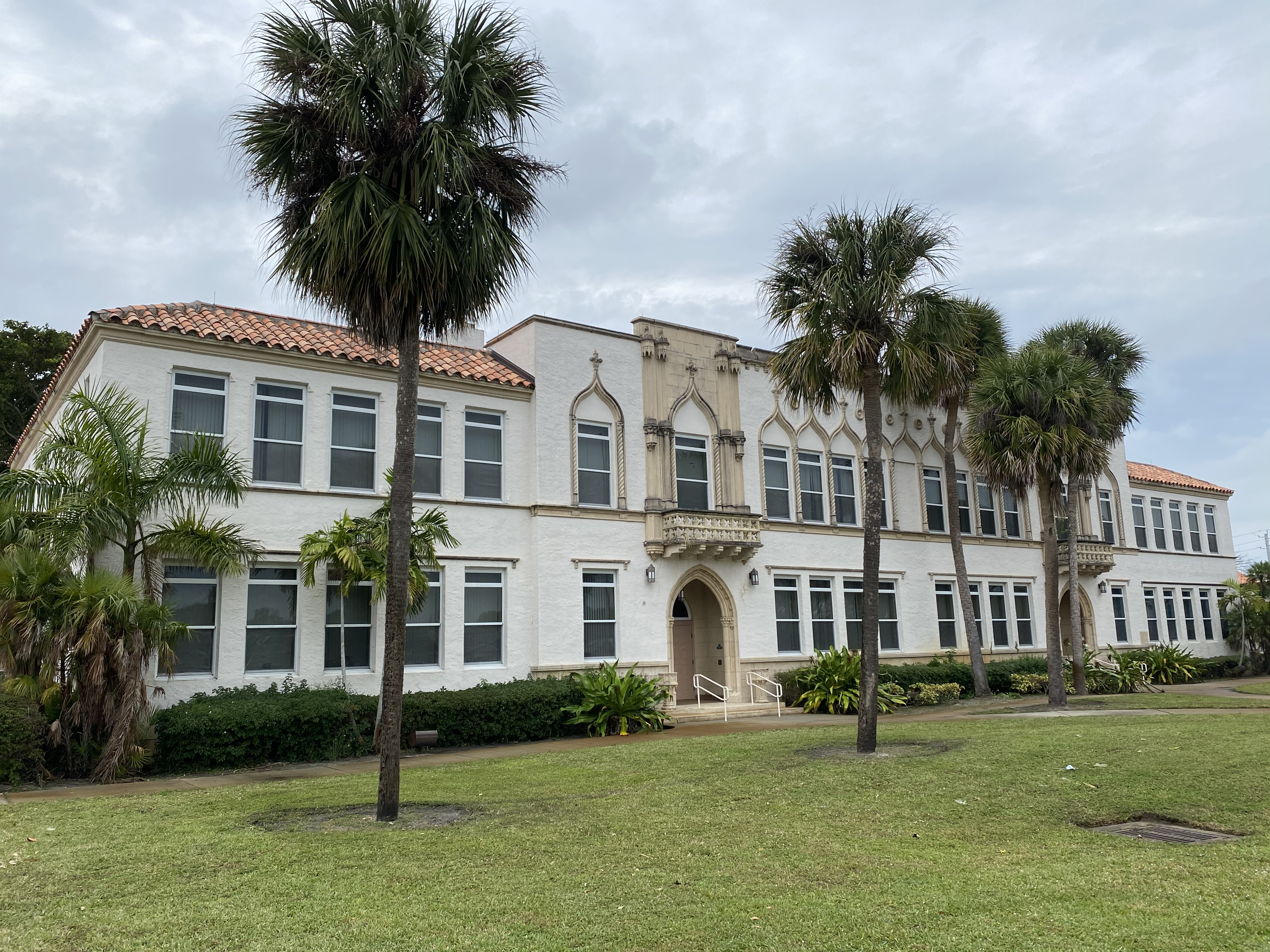

Location
- Jupiter, Palm Beach County, Florida; 26°55′55.16″N 80°05′59.94″W

Information
- Other names: Jupiter Elementary School; Historic Jupiter School
- Established: 1927; 99 years ago
- School district: Palm Beach County School District
- Grades: K–12

Old Jupiter School (aka Jupiter Elementary School, Historic Jupiter School) is a historic landmark located in Jupiter, Florida. The school was constructed in 1927 to serve approximately 100 white-only students and served as the area's primary school until 1965.

The school is owned and managed by the Palm Beach County School Board, which restored the interior of the building in 2006 at a cost of $6.4 million. The county continues to discuss more renovations in the future.

The building was designed by architect William Manly King, who designed all Palm Beach County schools built in the 1920s. The facility is architecturally described as a Mediterranean Revival.

== See also ==
- Primary education in the United States
- School segregation in the United States
- Harder Hall in Highlands County, Florida, NRHP listed
- Pahokee High School in Palm Beach County, Florida, NRHP listed
- Osborne School (1948) in Lake Worth, Florida.
- Palm Beach Junior College (1927),
- Old West Palm Beach National Guard Armory
