= 1991 West Palm Beach mayoral election =

West Palm Beach mayoral election, 1991
- November 5 and November 19, 1991
Nominee	Nancy M. Graham	Michael D. Hyman
Party	Nonpartisan	Nonpartisan
Popular vote	4,199	3,332
Percentage	55.8%	44.2%
Mayor before election
Jeff Koons
Nonpartisan
Elected mayor
Nancy Graham
Nonpartisan

The West Palm Beach mayoral election took place on November 5, 1991, to elect a mayor for West Palm Beach, Florida. Officially, elections for mayor of West Palm Beach are nonpartisan. Prior to this election, the city operated under a council–manager government system since 1919, with the city commissioners choosing the mayor, a mostly ceremonial office that had less power than the city manager. However, in March 1991, voters approved a referendum to allow a strong mayor and to transition the city government to a mayor-council structure. Thus, it was the first direct election for mayor of West Palm Beach since 1919.

Candidates for the general election included attorney and former state representative Joel T. Daves III, senior city planner Jim Exline, former city commissioner Nancy M. Graham, Josephine Stenson Grund, property management company owner and former mayor Michael D. Hyman, and former Palm Beach County commissioner Bill Medlen. With no candidate obtaining a majority of the vote, Graham and Hyman, who received 33.4% and 24.9% of the vote, respectively, advanced to a run-off election held on November 19. Graham prevailed over Hyman by a margin of 55.8%–44.2% and became the first strong and popularly elected mayor in over seven decades.

== Background ==
In the early history of West Palm Beach, mayors were elected by a direct vote, beginning with John S. Earman in 1894. However, a movement to transition to a council–manager government gained enough momentum to allow a vote in 1919. Under the proposal, the citizens would elect members of the city council, who would in turn select the mayor. On August 29, 1919, voters approved the proposal by 201–82. The proposal also called for a primary for the election of city commissioners to be held within three weeks. The rules for the primary stated the top three vote-getters were elected to the city council. Eventually, the city commission expanded to five members. In 1978, candidates for commission began being elected by district, rather than at-large.

=== Strong mayor referendum ===
During the next several decades following the vote in 1919, public opinion reversed in support of a strong mayor, elected by citizens. In a straw poll conducted by The Palm Beach Post in 1990, 78.5% of respondents indicated that they wanted to directly elect the mayor. Later that year, a five-member committee began collecting signatures for a petition to force a vote. The group collected 1,638 signatures, one more than required. Under their proposal, the mayor would be elected to a four-year term and be eligible for re-election once, the city manager and mayor would share administrative duties, and the mayor would receive the power to veto commission votes, which could be overridden by a 4–1 vote. Additionally, the mayor would be authorized to line-item veto the budget, initiate investigations, and supervise contracts and purchases involving more than $5,000. This proposal was listed on the ballot as Question 2. In response, the city commission submitted Question 1, which effectively added a weak mayor. In this proposal, the difference versus Question 2 is that the city manager would retain administrative authority, the mayor would vote with city commissioners in the event of a tie, and the mayor could not veto votes by the city commission.

On the ballot, voters were required to vote yes or no to Question 1 and Question 2. If both received a majority of yes votes, the question with more votes passed. The election was held on March 12, 1991. Both propositions received a majority of the votes. Question 1 received 2,944 yes votes versus 2,665 no votes, a margin of 52.6%–47.4%. Question 2 passed by a margin of 65.7%–34.3% and a vote total of 3,779–1,972. Therefore, Question 2 prevailed, allowing citizens of West Palm Beach to directly elect a strong mayor.

== Candidates ==
- Joel T. Daves III, attorney
- Jim Exline, city senior planner
- Nancy M. Graham, former city commissioner
- Josephine Stenson Grund, write-in candidate
- Michael D. Hyman, former city commissioner
- Bill Medlen, former Palm Beach County commissioner

== Campaign ==
=== General election results ===
Mayor of West Palm Beach, Florida 1991
Party	Candidate	Votes	%
Nonpartisan	Nancy M. Graham	2,739	34.3
Nonpartisan	Michael D. Hyman	2,046	24.9
Nonpartisan	Joel T. Daves III	1,994	24.3
Nonpartisan	Bill Medlen	1,164	14.1
Nonpartisan	Jim Exline	268	3.3
Nonpartisan	Josephine Stenson Grund (write-in)	3	0
Total votes		8,205	100.0

=== Run-off results ===
With a turnout of approximately 28.7% of eligible voters, Nancy M. Graham won the election against Michael D. Hyman by a margin of 55.8%–44.2%, or 4,199–3,332 in total votes. Graham carried 22 out of 31 precincts. As a result of this election, Graham became the first mayor elected by direct vote since 1919, as well as the city's first strong mayor.

Mayor of West Palm Beach, Florida 1991 run-off
Party	Candidate	Votes	%
Nonpartisan	Nancy M. Graham	4,199	55.8
Nonpartisan	Michael D. Hyman	3,332	44.2
Total votes		7,531	100.0

== See also ==
- West Palm Beach mayoral election, 2015
