= Joel T. Daves III =

American lawyer and politician (1928–2021)

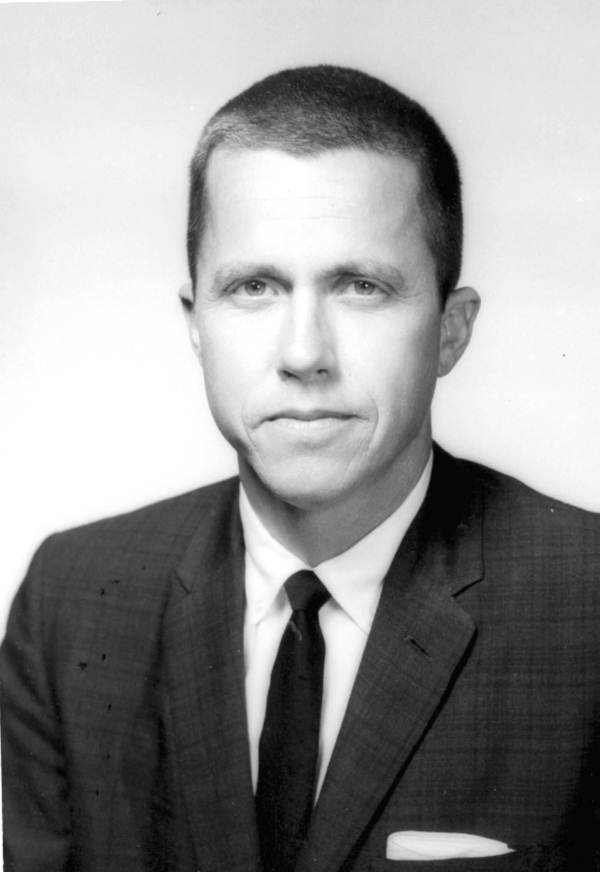
- Daves in 1965

Member of the Florida House of Representatives from Palm Beach County
- In office 1965–1966

Mayor of West Palm Beach, Florida
- In office March 25, 1999 – March 27, 2003
- Preceded by: Nancy M. Graham
- Succeeded by: Lois Frankel

Personal details
- Born: July 14, 1928 Atlanta, Georgia, U.S.
- Died: July 20, 2021 (aged 93)
- Party: Democratic
- Spouse: Darden Kettler
- Education: Sewanee: The University of the South; University of Florida Levin College of Law

Joel T. Daves III (July 14, 1928 – July 20, 2021) was an American politician and lawyer. He was appointed as the Palm Beach County solicitor in 1959 and won the election to that office in 1960. Daves declined to seek reelection in 1964, instead running for a seat in the Florida House of Representatives. He served two years as a Democratic state representative before being defeated in 1966. Attempting a political comeback, Daves ran for the United States Senate in 1970 but placed last among the five Democratic primary candidates. After over two decades of not seeking a political office, he unsuccessfully ran for mayor of West Palm Beach in 1991. He was then elected city commissioner in 1992 and mayor of West Palm Beach in 1999. Daves lost to Lois Frankel in the 2003 mayoral election.

== Early life, education, and career ==
Joel T. Daves III was born in Atlanta, Georgia, on July 14, 1928. In 1938, when Daves was 10, he and his family moved to West Palm Beach, Florida. As a boy, he was involved with the Boy Scouts of America, earning the rank of Eagle Scout. Daves worked a paper route and eventually became a car dealer. He also played football at Palm Beach High School and the University of the South. Daves studied law, earning a bachelor's degree at the University of the South and a J.D. at the University of Florida's Fredric G. Levin College of Law. After that, he served in the United States Marine Corps from 1953 to 1955. By 1955, Daves began working as an attorney, joining the law firm of B. F. Paty, his then-father-in-law.

Daves entered public office on July 7, 1959, when Florida Governor LeRoy Collins appointed him to the office of Palm Beach County Solicitor, which was being vacated by the resignation of Charles A. Nugent on August 1. In 1960, former FBI agent and assistant county solicitor John Hiatt challenged Daves for reelection in the Democratic primary. On May 3, Daves defeated Hiatt by a vote of 17,183 to 14,686, and then faced no opposition in the general election. Notably, while serving as county solicitor, he filed charges against Richard Paul Pavlick on December 30, 1960. Pavlick was accused of plotting an assassination attempt against then-president-elect John F. Kennedy. Charges were reduced to a misdemeanor charge for illegally transporting dynamite across state lines after federal judge Emett Clay Choate ruled on December 2, 1963, that Pavlick was legally insane. Daves announced on January 2, 1964, that he would not seek another term as county solicitor.

== Florida House of Representatives and 1970 United States Senate election campaign ==
Daves served in the Florida House of Representatives from 1965 to 1966.

On June 10, 1970, Daves declared his candidacy in the Democratic primary for the United States Senate election held on September 8; incumbent Spessard Holland was retiring. He ran on an anti-Vietnam War platform, calling for "immediate and total withdrawal of all American troops from Vietnam". He called the war "idiotic" and said it "defeats every constructive effort to restore our national sanity and heal our wounds". Daves favored either making the draft universal or eliminating it altogether. He held no strong opinion on the Cuban airlift, but said, "I think we have to learn to live with Castro". Daves believed in refining foreign policy to change the mindset of viewing communism as an international conspiracy. He suggested that the issue of school desegregation be left in the hands of the courts.

Daves's 1970 U.S. senate campaign gained little traction. By late August, he had raised only about $10,000, released no commercials, purchased no billboards, and opened only one campaign headquarters. In the primary election, he placed last in the group of the five candidates, behind attorney Alcee Hastings, Speaker of the Florida House of Representatives Frederick H. Schultz, State Senator Lawton Chiles, and former Governor of Florida C. Farris Bryant. Daves received 33,939 votes, 4.65% of all votes cast. Bryant and Chiles advanced to a runoff election, which Chiles won. Chiles defeated the Republican nominee, U.S. Representative William C. Cramer, in the November 3 general election.

== West Palm Beach government and later life ==
After losing the 1970 U.S. Senate election, Daves served as an attorney with Sylvan Burdick from 1971 to 1989, before opening his own practice, which struggled financially. In 1991, he entered the West Palm Beach mayoral election, the city's first direct, strong mayor election. His campaign focused on crime reduction and efforts to stop downtown decay, but suggested no additional public money should be spent on improvements. In the November 5 general election, Daves placed third, receiving 1,994 votes (24.3%) to Nancy M. Graham's 2,739 (33.4%) and Michael D. Hyman's 2,044 (24.9%). Graham and Hyman were both former city commissioners. Being only 50 votes (0.1%) behind Hyman in the initial tally, Daves requested a recount, which yielded no additional votes for Daves and added two to Hyman's total. Daves endorsed Graham in the subsequent runoff election.

In February 1992, following the announcement of the retirement of Helen Wilkes, Daves declared his candidacy for her city commission seat, the 3rd district. His campaign called for revising the city charter – particularly in regard to the mayor's powers – reforming the police department, and promoting economic development. Daves easily defeated his opponent, Ed Gonzalez, 63.0%–37.0%, in the March 10 election.

Daves was mayor of West Palm Beach, Florida from 1999 to 2003.

Daves died on July 20, 2021, at the age of 93.
