= Reid Moore Jr. =

American politician

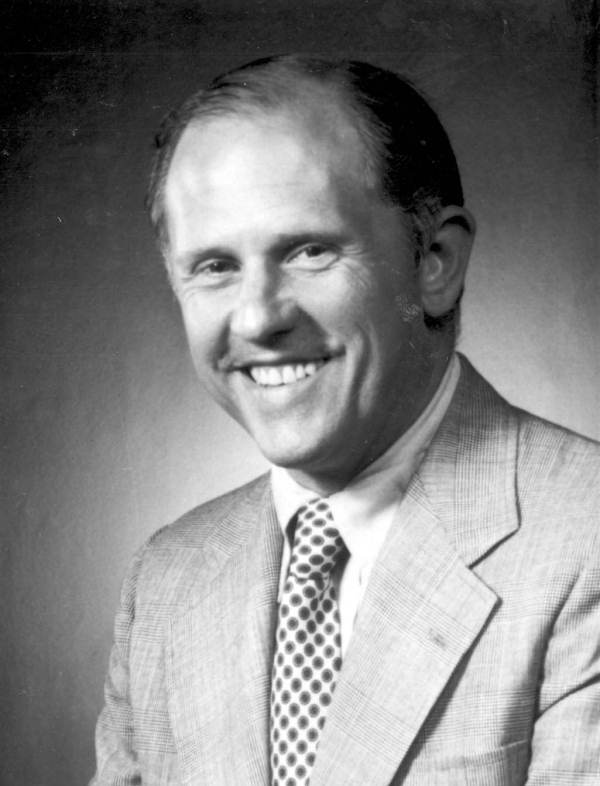
- Moore in 1980

Member of the Florida House of Representatives from the 81st district
- In office 1980–1982

Member of the Florida House of Representatives from the 79th district
- In office 1976–1978

Mayor of West Palm Beach
- In office 1967–1968
- Preceded by: C. Harold Earnest
- Succeeded by: David H. Brady

Personal details
- Born: September 27, 1934 (age 91) Chattanooga, Tennessee
- Party: Republican
- Occupation: attorney

Reid Moore Jr. (born September 27, 1934) is an American former politician in the state of Florida who served two non-consecutive terms in the Florida House of Representatives and as Mayor of West Palm Beach. Born in Tennessee, he earned a law degree from the University of Virginia before moving to Florida in 1959. Moore soon became involved with local politics in West Palm Beach, beginning with serving as a member of the Greater West Palm Beach Chamber of Commerce Board of Directors in 1963. Two years later, he mounted a successful campaign for city commissioner, an office he would hold from 1965 to 1969. During his tenure, he was chosen by his fellow commissioners to be Mayor of West Palm Beach from 1967 to 1968, as the city operated under the Council–manager form of government at the time.

After leaving office as a city commissioner of West Palm Beach, Moore was elected to 79th district of the Florida House of Representatives in 1976 and served one term before losing re-election in 1978. However, he made another successful run for office in 1980, this time for the 81st district of the Florida House of Representatives.

== Early life and education ==
Born in Chattanooga, Tennessee, Moore attended Baylor School as a boy, before going to Yale University, where he earned a B.A. in 1956. Continuing his education, he went to the University of Virginia School of Law and completed a LL.B. in 1959. That same year, he moved to Florida and soon practiced law with his father.

== Political career ==
By 1963, Moore was involved with the local government of West Palm Beach, serving as a member of the Greater West Palm Beach Chamber of Commerce Board of Directors. He sought political office for the first time in 1965, running for Group E of the West Palm Beach City Commission. He pledged cooperation with citizens and fellow commissioners, while emphasizing the need for improvements to downtown, the local tourism industry, and major roads. His campaign was successful and he led his nearest opponent—three-time commissioner Sylvan B. Burdick—by a vote of 3,511 to 1,988.

Moore was sworn into office as a city commissioner on March 31, 1965. During his tenure, the city commissioners unanimously selected Moore to serve as Mayor of West Palm Beach from 1967 to 1968, under the Council–manager form of government. After four years on the city commission Moore declined to run for re-election for his seat and was succeeded by Francis H. Foster Jr. in March 1969.

He served as a Republican in the Florida House of Representatives from 1976 to 1978, representing the 79th district. During his 1976 campaign for that office, Moore's slogan was "We need More in Tallahassee." He described himself as a "moderate conservative" and ran on his record as city commissioner and Mayor of West Palm Beach, including establishing the Downtown Development Authority. After losing re-election to Eleanor Weinstock in 1978, he mounted another successful campaign for Florida House of Representatives in 1980 this time representing the 81st district from 1980 to 1982.

== Memberships ==
Moore currently is or has been a member of several clubs and civic organizations, including the American Bar Association, American Red Cross, Forum Club of Palm Beaches, Fraternal Order of Police, Jaycees of West Palm Beach, Northwood Lodge and Amara Shrine, United Fund, West Palm Beach Chamber of Commerce, and the YMCA.
