= West Palm Beach Braves =

Defunct professional baseball team

- (1965–1968); West Palm Beach, Florida

Minor league affiliations
- Class: Class A
- League: Florida State League

Major league affiliations
- Team: Milwaukee/Atlanta Braves

Team data
- Ballpark: Connie Mack Field

The West Palm Beach Braves were a Minor League Baseball team that operated from 1965 to 1968, based in West Palm Beach, Florida. The team was an affiliate of the Braves franchise of Major League Baseball (MLB)—the major-league Braves were based in Milwaukee from 1953 to 1965, and Atlanta thereafter. The minor-league Braves played in the Florida State League and at the ballpark Connie Mack Field.

== Year-by-year records ==
| Year | Record | Finish | Manager | Playoffs |
|---|---|---|---|---|
| 1965 | 59–73 | 8th | Andy Pafko | Did not qualify |
| 1966 | 45–89 | 9th | Buddy Hicks | Did not qualify |
| 1967 | 51–81 | 8th | Eddie Haas | Did not qualify |
| 1968 | 59–77 | 8th | Andy Pafko | Did not qualify |

== See also ==
- West Palm Beach Braves players
- West Palm Beach Indians, an earlier team in West Palm Beach
- West Palm Beach Expos, a later team in West Palm Beach
