= 2015 West Palm Beach mayoral election =

West Palm Beach mayoral election, 2015
- March 2015
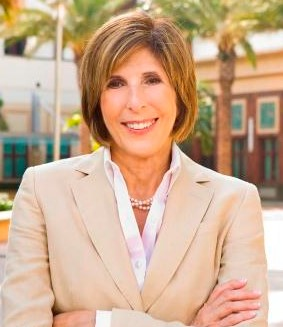

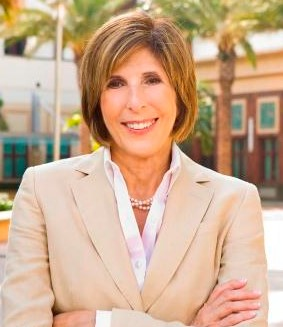
Mayor before election
Jeri Muoio
Democratic
Elected mayor
Jeri Muoio
Democratic

The West Palm Beach mayoral election took place in March 2015 to elect a mayor for West Palm Beach, Florida. Incumbent Jeri Muoio won re-election for a second term in office.
