= William Manly King =

American architect

William Manly King (May 19, 1886 – 1961) was an architect in the United States. He is known for the buildings he designed in Florida, especially West Palm Beach. Several are listed on the National Register of Historic Places.

King was born in Macon, Mississippi. His family moved to Atlanta, where he attended the University School for Boys in Stone Mountain, Georgia. He attended Georgia Tech, where he took courses in drafting and architecture.

== Career ==
After a few partnerships in Birmingham, Alabama, King moved to West Palm Beach, Florida, in 1921 and worked with Addison Mizner before establishing his own practice.

King's office was in West Palm Beach. He was the Palm Beach County Board of Public Instruction's architect and designed school buildings throughout Palm Beach County. He also designed hotels in West Palm Beach. He designed the seal for the City of West Palm Beach.

== Selected Works ==
- Harder Hall, hotel near Sebring in Highlands County, Florida, NRHP listed (1925)
- Pahokee High School (Old Pahokee High School) on E. Main Street in Palm Beach County, Florida, NRHP listed
- Hibiscus Garden Apartments (1926)
- Palm Beach Junior College (1927), 813 Gardenia Ave., opened in 1933 as Florida's first public community college. Mediterranean Revival in style.
- West Palm Beach fire stations
- Old Jupiter School (Jupiter Epementary School) (1927)
- Boynton Beach High School (1927), 125 East Ocean Ave. Now serves as the Boynton Beach Arts & Cultural Center (2021), cited by the Art Deco Society of the Palm Beaches.
- Old West Palm Beach National Guard Armory, at 1703 South Lake Avenue. Now the Armory Arts Center. Art Deco design. Works Progress Administration project built in 1939, NRHP listed
- Osborne School (1948) in Lake Worth, Florida. A school for African American students. 1726 Douglas Street NRHP listed
