= 1970 United States Senate election in Florida =

- November 3, 1970
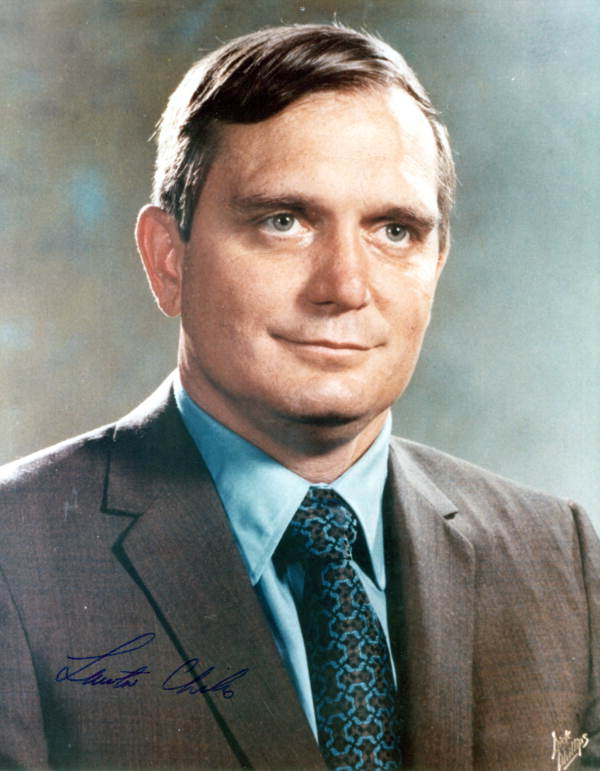

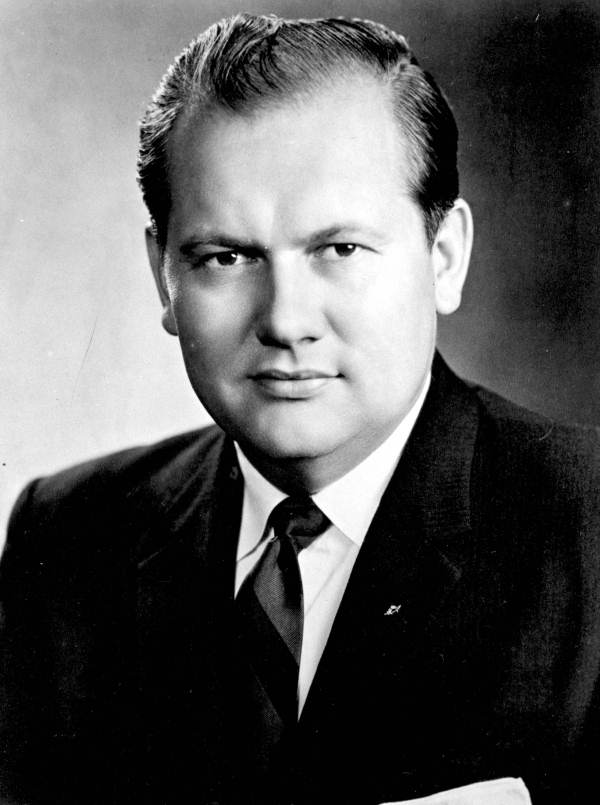
Nominee	Lawton Chiles	Bill Cramer
Party	Democratic	Republican
Popular vote	902,438	772,817
Percentage	53.87%	46.13%
- County results Chiles: 50–60% 60–70% 70–80% 80–90% Cramer: 50–60% 60–70%
U.S. senator before election
Spessard Holland
Democratic
Elected U.S. Senator
Lawton Chiles
Democratic

The 1970 United States Senate election in Florida was held on November 3, 1970. Incumbent Democratic U.S. Senator Spessard Holland decided to retire instead of seeking a fifth term. During the Democratic primary, former Governor C. Farris Bryant and State Senator Lawton Chiles advanced to a run-off, having received more votes than Speaker of the Florida House of Representatives Frederick H. Schultz, attorney Alcee Hastings, and State Representative Joel T. Daves III. Chiles soundly defeated Bryant in the run-off election, scoring a major upset due to his comparatively small name recognition prior to the election. To acquire name recognition and media coverage, Chiles walked about 1,003 miles (1,614 km) across the state of Florida and was given the nickname "Walkin' Lawton".

The Republican primary exposed an in-party feud between Governor Claude R. Kirk Jr. and U.S. Representative William C. Cramer. In the election, Cramer handily defeated G. Harrold Carswell and body shop owner George Balmer; the former was a Fifth Circuit Court of Appeals judge favored by Kirk and had been rejected as a Supreme Court of the United States nominee a few months prior to the primary. Chiles won the election by a relatively small margin of 7.8%, receiving 902,438 votes against Cramer's 772,817 votes.

== Background ==
Incumbent Spessard Holland, who served in the Senate since 1946, decided to retire rather than seek a fifth term. Although the Democratic Party had dominated state elections since the Reconstruction Era, Claude R. Kirk Jr. and Edward Gurney, both Republicans, were elected Governor and Senator in 1966 and 1968, respectively.

== Democratic primary ==
=== Candidates ===
- C. Farris Bryant, former governor of Florida (1961–65)
- Lawton Chiles, state senator from Lakeland
- Joel T. Daves III, state representative from Palm Beach
- Alcee Hastings, Miramar civil rights attorney
- Frederick H. Schultz, Speaker of the Florida House of Representatives from Jacksonville

==== Withdrew ====
- Robert Haverfield, state senator from Miami

==== Declined ====
- Sam Gibbons, U.S. representative from Tampa

=== Campaign ===
Initially, Bryant, a well-known figure, was seen as a natural front-runner. He was challenged by State Senator Lawton Chiles, Speaker of the Florida House of Representatives Frederick H. Schultz, attorney Alcee Hastings, and State Representative Joel T. Daves III.

==== "Walkin' Lawton" ====
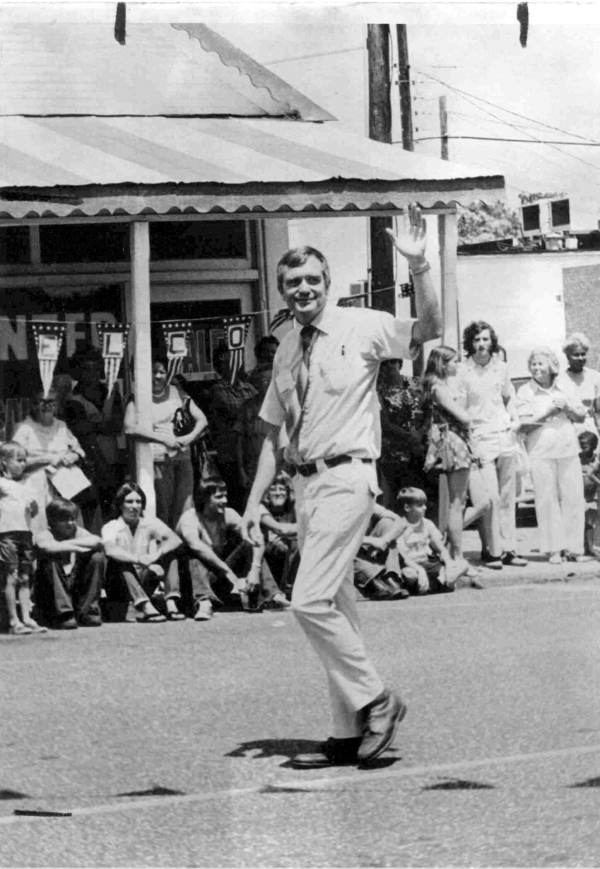
Lawton Chiles during the walk

Chiles, despite a twelve-year career in the legislature, was largely unknown outside his district. A poll indicated that Chiles had a name recognition of only 5%. To generate some media coverage across the state, Chiles embarked upon a 1,003-mile (1,614 km) walk across Florida. He would spend each night in a camper, which was driven by one of his aides.

On March 17, Chiles began the walk starting in Century, a small town in Escambia County along the Alabama state line. He initially headed east along State Road 4, toward Tallahassee. Throughout the journey, a number of people walked a small portion of the distance, including State Senators Wilbur H. Boyd – uncle of State House member Jim Boyd – and Bob Saunders. Upon reaching the community of Milligan, Chiles turned onto U.S. Route 90, then the main highway through the Florida Panhandle, toward Crestview. On April 7, he reached Tallahassee and remained there during the Florida Legislative session, which lasted 60 days. Thereafter, he continued on Route 90 for several days, until reaching Lake City, where he began heading along State Road 100 to the city of Lake Butler.

After reaching Starke, Chiles headed south on Route 301 toward Waldo, where he switched to State Road 24 toward Gainesville. There, he met many students, professors, and others in the vicinity of the University of Florida, his alma mater. He next made a side trip to Pasco County, visiting Dade City, New Port Richey, and Zephyrhills. Chiles made another side trip to Volusia County on the east coast, passing through the cities of Daytona Beach, DeLand, and New Smyrna Beach. Thereafter, he went back to Gainesville and walked south on Route 441 to Ocala.

The 91-day walk earned him the recognition he sought, and the nickname that would follow him throughout his political career – "Walkin' Lawton", coined by Associated Press writer John Van Gieson after Chiles passed through the town of Ponce de Leon.

16.4% of the voting age population participated in the Democratic primary.

=== Results ===
==== Primary election ====
Democratic Party primary results
Party	Candidate	Votes	%
Democratic	C. Farris Bryant	240,222	32.90
Democratic	Lawton Chiles	188,300	25.79
Democratic	Frederick H. Schultz	175,745	24.07
Democratic	Alcee Hastings	91,948	12.59
Democratic	Joel Daves	33,939	4.65
Total votes		730,154	100.00

==== Runoff primary election ====
Democratic Party primary runoff results
Party	Candidate	Votes	%
Democratic	Lawton Chiles	474,420	65.74
Democratic	Farris Bryant	247,211	34.26
Total votes		721,631	100.00

== Republican primary ==
=== Candidates ===
- George Balmer, body shop owner
- G. Harrold Carswell, former judge on the United States Court of Appeals for the Fifth Circuit and nominee for the United States Supreme Court
- Bill Cramer, U.S. representative from St. Petersburg

=== Campaign ===
In fall 1969, Cramer declared his candidacy for the United States Senate with encouragement from President Richard Nixon; incumbent Spessard Holland announced his retirement as expected shortly thereafter. He was opposed in the Republican primary by Ray Osborne, the lieutenant governor and a Kirk ally. However, after Nixon's appointment of G. Harrold Carswell to the Supreme Court of the United States was rejected in the Senate, conservatives in Florida urged Carswell to resign from as a Court of Appeals judge to run for the open seat. Both Kirk and Gurney endorsed Carswell, and Osborne withdrew from the race.

Nixon remained neutral in the primary between Carswell and Cramer, and his press secretary, Gerald Lee Warren, claimed that Nixon has "no knowledge [of] and no involvement [with]" the Carswell campaign. Carswell himself claimed that he no knowledge of the gentleman's agreement between Cramer and Gurney and had been considering a run for Senate before he was ever nominated to the Supreme Court. Carswell ran a conservative campaign, claiming that his rejection by the Senate was attributable to the "dark evil winds of liberalism" and the "Northern press and its knee-jerking followers in the Senate." He was endorsed by John Wayne and Gene Autry, and he hired Richard Viguerie as a fundraiser.

Cramer stressed his success in amending the Civil Rights Act of 1964 to prohibit desegregation busing and questioned Carswell's concurrence in two Fifth Circuit busing decisions. Cramer also attacked "cop killers, bombers, burners, and racial revolutionaries who would destroy America."

In parallel to the campaign for Senate, Jack Eckerd, a Pennsylvania transplant and drugstore magnate, ran against Kirk for the Republican nomination, predicting that Kirk's renomination would mean defeat in the general election. Although Cramer did not publicly take a position in the primary, he privately voted for Eckerd, and Kirk later accused him of providing covert support to the Eckerd campaign.

In the September primary, Cramer easily defeated Carswell and businessman George Balmer. Cramer attributed his Senate nomination to his grassroots support and Carswell's lack of campaign experience; Carswell claimed that his support among conservative Democrats would have been considerable had Florida, like Alabama and Georgia, used an open primary. In the gubernatorial primary, neither Kirk nor Eckerd received a majority of the vote; Kirk later won the runoff election when the third candidate in the race, Skip Bafalis, endorsed him.

=== Results ===
Republican Primary results
Party	Candidate	Votes	%
Republican	Bill Cramer	220,553	62.52
Republican	G. Harrold Carswell	121,281	34.38
Republican	George Balmer	10,947	3.10
Total votes		352,781	100.00

== General election ==
=== Candidates ===
- Lawton Chiles, state senator from Lakeland (Democratic)
- Bill Cramer, U.S. representative from St. Petersburg (Republican)

=== Campaign ===
In the general election, both Cramer and Kirk were endorsed by their respective primary opponents, but neither Carswell nor Eckerd were active in the campaign. By contrast, the Democratic Party was united behind their nominees, Lawton Chiles for senator and Reubin Askew for governor. The Miami Herald, which endorsed the Democratic ticket, noted that Kirk and Cramer formed an "uneasy alliance." Republican representative Louis Frey Jr. implored the factions to unite for the general election.

Cramer struggled to gain traction against Chiles, who had become broadly popular during the primary campaign after his 92-day, 1,000 mile walk from the Panhandle to Key Largo. Cramer sought to paint Chiles as a liberal, but The New York Times observed that Chiles and Askew "convey[ed] amiable good ol' boy qualities with moderate-to-liberal aspirations that do not strike fear into the hearts of conservatives." Cramer also campaigned against J. William Fulbright as the chairman of the Senate Foreign Relations Committee. In response, Chiles noted that if Republicans controlled the Senate, other southern Democrats would also forfeit committee chairmanships earned and long controlled through their seniority.

Chiles sought to court the growing environmental vote by announcing his opposition to the Cross Florida Barge Canal, which had been supported by every member of the Florida congressional delegation and was one-third completed. Cramer questioned Chiles' opposition to a proposed severance tax on phosphate mining, which particularly affected Tampa Bay. Cramer attacked Chiles's personal wealth (estimated at $300,000, or approximately $1,916,493 in 2025) and multiple votes he had cast in the Florida Senate on insurance while running an insurance agency as conflicts-of-interests.

Both candidates were opposed to desegregation busing, though Chiles attracted Black support by declaring Cramer's efforts to introduce antibusing legislation as "just talk" and "an emotional issue" and proposing magnet schools to negate busing as an issue.

=== Endorsements ===
Richard Nixon campaigned throughout the state for Cramer, marking the first presidential appearance in Tallahassee since William McKinley. Nixon emphasized his opposition to desegregation busing as contrary to the law and "quality education." He also visited St. Petersburg, where he called for an honorable end to American involvement in the Vietnam War and attacked "permissiveness, pornography, and busing," Miami Beach, and Palm Beach.

Although nearly all major newspapers in the state had endorsed Cramer during the Republican primary, only three supported him in the general election. Chiles was also endorsed by outgoing Senator Holland, and Chiles claimed that Cramer could campaign with ""Nixon, Agnew, Reagan, and anybody else he wants. ... I'll take Holland on my side against all of them." Chiles was also endorsed by George Wallace of Alabama late in the campaign, after Kirk claimed that Wallace was a "racist" and a "flaming liberal."

=== Polling ===
Polls showed Chiles leading larger than three-to-two. Cramer insisted that the polls reflected only the views of the media. The St. Petersburg Times found Cramer led Chiles in his home county of Pinellas by only seven points.

=== Results ===
United States Senate election in Florida, 1970
Party	Candidate	Votes	%	±%
Democratic	Lawton Chiles	902,438	53.87%	−10.09%
Republican	Bill Cramer	772,817	46.13%	+10.09%
Majority		129,621	7.74%	−20.17%
Turnout		1,675,255	[?]	[?]
Democratic hold		Swing	[?]	

== Aftermath ==
Historian Billy Hathorn claimed that the 1970 schism damaged the growth of the Florida Republican Party in the state that it took years to recover, depriving the party the opportunity to seize the moderate center of the Florida electorate. After 1970, Florida Republicans faced several decades of uncontroversial moderate Democrats.

== See also ==
- United States Senate elections, 1970

== Works cited ==
- Coggin, John Dos Passos (November 20, 2012). Walkin' Lawton. Cocoa, Florida: The Florida Historical Society Press. ISBN 978-1886104587.
- Hathorn, Billy (April 1990). "Cramer v. Kirk: The Florida Republican Schism of 1970". Florida Historical Quarterly.
- Steed, Robert; Moreland, Laurence; Baker, Tod, eds. (1980). Party Politics in the South. Praeger Publishers. ISBN 0030565863.
