= Jeri Muoio =

American politician (born 1948)

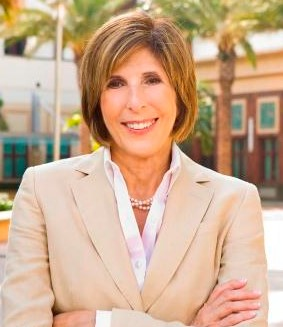

Mayor of West Palm Beach
- In office March 31, 2011 – April 4, 2019
- Preceded by: Lois Frankel
- Succeeded by: Keith James

Personal details
- Born: February 14, 1948 (age 78)
- Party: Democratic
- Spouse: Charles
- Profession: Politician

Geraldine "Jeri" Muoio (born February 14, 1948) is an American politician who served as Mayor of West Palm Beach, Florida from 2011 to 2019.

Muoio is a resident of Old Northwood in West Palm Beach. She holds a doctorate in academic administration from Syracuse University and a master's degree from SUNY Oswego.

She served as the city commissioner of West Palm Beach before her election as Mayor of West Palm Beach in March 2011. She has been described as the "hand-picked successor" of outgoing Mayor Lois Frankel, who left office due to term limits after two consecutive terms.

Muoio won 51.2% of the vote in the 2011 West Palm Beach mayoral election held on March 8, 2011. Most political observers had predicted that the crowded, four-way mayoral race would result in a runoff election. However, Muoio won the election with a majority, avoiding a runoff. She defeated three opponents - Molly Douglas, a West Palm Beach city commissioner; Paula Ryan, a housing consultant; and Charles Bantel, an electrician. Muoio received 4,761 votes, or 51.2%; Paula Ryan placed second with 23.3%; Molly Douglas was third with 21.3%; and Charles Bantel came in fourth place with 4.2% of the vote.

Muoio was inaugurated into office at 3:32 p.m. on March 31, 2011.
