= Kravis Center for the Performing Arts =

Arts center in West Palm Beach, Florida

- Exterior view of venue in 2026
- Interactive map of Kravis Center for the Performing Arts
- Full name: Raymond F. Kravis Center for the Performing Arts
- Address: 701 Okeechobee Blvd; West Palm Beach, Florida 33401-6323
- Coordinates: 26.707°N 80.060°W
- Owner: Private not for profit corporation
- Capacity: 2,195 (Dreyfoos Hall); 305 (Rinker Playhouse); 291 (Persson Hall)

Construction
- Groundbreaking: May 24, 1989
- Opened: September 19, 1992
- Cost: $55 million ($143 million in 2025 dollars)
- Architect: Eberhard Zeidler
- General contractor: Blount, Inc.

Website
- www.kravis.org

The Kravis Center for the Performing Arts (often referred to as the Kravis Center) is a performing arts center in downtown West Palm Beach, Florida, United States.

== History ==
=== 1978–1992 ===
In 1978, the Palm Beach County Council of the Arts was created by Alexander W. Dreyfoos Jr. The council's goals focused on the development of local arts, and sought to create a major performing arts center following the success of the Palm Beach Playhouse. In 1986, friends of Raymond F. Kravis raised a $5 million donation in his honor, beginning construction for the eventual 1992 opening. The donation, headed by Leonard Davis and Merrill Bank, grew to $10 million before 1992, and the two remain on the center's committee.

The center was built on the former site of Connie Mack Field, spring training home of the Kansas City Athletics until 1962 when it was replaced by West Palm Beach Municipal Stadium.

The grand opening was held in September 1992, a gala that included performances and speeches from Burt Reynolds, Ella Fitzgerald, Lily Tomlin, and more.

=== 1992–present ===
Since the Kravis Center's twentieth year, the facilities include four venues – the 2,195-seat Alexander W. Dreyfoos Jr. Concert Hall, the 289-seat Rinker Playhouse, and the 170-seat Helen K. Persson Hall. Additionally, the Kravis Center's facilities include the Cohen Pavilion, housing the Weiner Banquet Center and the Gimelstob Ballroom, The Elmore Family Business Center for the Arts, and The Picower Foundation Arts Education Center, which includes Persson Hall and The Khoury Family Dance Rehearsal Hall.

In March 2016, the Kravis Center became the first performing arts center in the world to install a custom-designed digital organ. The project was funded by Alexander W. Dreyfoos.

To date, the center has opened the door to the performing arts for more than 2 million school children as well as thousands of economically disadvantaged senior citizens, minorities and community groups.

On March 26, 2018, the West Palm Beach City Commission approved plans for expanding the center to be completed in summer of 2020.

== Venues ==
The center is composed of a performance theater, black box theater and an events hall.

- Alexander W. Dreyfoos Jr. Concert Hall (Dreyfoos Hall) is a 90,000 sqft concert hall that seats over 2,000 guests. The theater opened November 1992 and serves as the main venue of the complex.
- Marshall E. Rinker Sr. Playhouse (Rinker Playhouse) is a 5,000 sqft black box theater for 300 guests. Opening in October 1994, it is frequently used for comedic performances and the residence of the MNM Theatre Company.
- Eunice and Julian Cohen Pavilion (Cohen Pavilion) is a $31 million events hall built in 2002 and opened September 2003. The building include a series of meeting rooms and rehearsal spaces, along with ballroom and recital hall. It is divided into two floors: the Weiner Banquet Hall and the Picower Foundation Arts Education Center.
  - Helen K. Persson Hall is a 5,000 sqft recital hall that seats 291 guests.
  - Herbert and Elaine Gimelstob Ballroom is the main gala hall for events held within the pavilion. The ballroom can seat up to 800 guests.

== Youth engagement ==
Kravis Dream Awards

In July 2017, the Kravis Center announced a new education program for high school students, the Kravis Center Dream Awards: Celebrating High School Musical Theater Excellence (Dream Awards).

The first Dream Awards was showcased on June 3, 2018 in the 2,195-seat Dreyfoos Hall at the Kravis Center. The performing arts initiative opened itself to all public and private schools in Palm Beach County, and it offers the chance for two nominees, one male and one female, to progress from the regional competition onto the national one, the Jimmy Awards, in New York City. The awards event also highlights a high school dramatic educator for notable inspiration to their students.

"We have always wanted to create a high school musical theater awards program here at the Kravis Center, so we're thrilled that our Dream Awards are launching this season," said Judith Mitchell, Kravis Center CEO. "Our community has become the cultural capital of Florida, and these awards are a testament to the mission of the Kravis Center, as well as to the hard work by our local educators to make arts education a priority for our young people."

Award categories:

1. Outstanding Lead Performer (Solo Performance)
2. Outstanding Lead Performer (Duet Performance)
3. Outstanding Lead Act
4. Outstanding Lead Act Alternate
5. Outstanding Musical Performance
6. Outstanding Featured Dancer
7. Outstanding Ensemble Act
8. Outstanding Supporting Act
9. Outstanding Musical Performance
10. Outstanding Costume Design
11. Outstanding Sound Design
12. Outstanding Stage Management
13. Best Musical

ArtsCamp

ArtsCamps is a three week summer intensive offered by the Kravis Center for students between the ages of nine and eleven. Under the guidance of professional teaching artists, the program aims to cultivate creativity through allowing children to explore dance, technical theater, and vocal music. At the end of the intensive, the campers are able to share what they have learned with the local community in a showcase performance.

== Community engagement ==
The Kravis Center has hosted community events, such as their annual free block party. During these events, attendees were able to participate in many activities related to the arts. For example, people were able to view live performances from Grammy nominated artists, take dance lessons, and participate in painting workshops.

Volunteering

The Kravis Center offers several volunteering opportunities for the surrounding community to become involved in. According to the theater's official website, they offer opportunities to work with administration, hospitality, education, and ushers.

The theater also has initiated food drive volunteering opportunities, such as the annual "Pack to Give Back". This event specifically was put on in collaboration between the Kravis Center and the Palm Beach County Food Bank. The food drive event packed over 200,000 meals for Palm Beach County residents who are struggling with hunger.
