= Connie Mack Field =

Former ballpark in West Palm Beach, Florida

Coordinates: 26°42′26.35″N 80°3′40.43″W

- Mack Field
- Interactive map of Connie Mack Field
- Full name: Connie Mack Field
- Former names: Municipal Athletic Field (1924–1926); Wright Field (1927–1952)
- Location: West Palm Beach, Florida
- Capacity: 3,500
- Surface: Grass

Construction
- Opened: October 1924
- Demolished: February 1992

Tenants
- St. Louis Browns (AL) (spring training) (1928–1936); Rochester Red Wings (IL) (spring training) (1940); Philadelphia / Kansas City Athletics (AL) (spring training) (1946–1962); West Palm Beach Indians (FECL) (1940–1942); (FIL) (1946–1954); (FSL) (1955); West Palm Beach Sun Chiefs (FSL) (1956); West Palm Beach Braves (FSL) (1965–1968)

Connie Mack Field was a ballpark in midtown West Palm Beach, Florida, which was the long-time spring training home of the Philadelphia Athletics/Kansas City Athletics.

The stadium was built in 1924 and initially named Municipal Athletic Field. It hosted its first event, a football game, in October 1924. The first baseball game was played in December 1924.

It was renamed Wright Field in 1927 for West Palm Beach City Manager George C. Wright, then was renamed Connie Mack Field in 1952 in honor of long-time Philadelphia Athletics owner and manager Connie Mack.

The grandstands originally held about 2,000; Black fans were restricted to a small section in the right-field corner to keep them away from the White fans. Total capacity was about 3,500.

Record attendance for baseball was on March 20, 1949, when 6,988 fans saw the A's defeat the Brooklyn Dodgers in a spring training game, by a 6-0 decision, which featured Jackie Robinson on the field and then-Secretary of State General of the Army George C. Marshall in attendance.

The stadium was replaced in 1962 by West Palm Beach Municipal Stadium although the grandstand remained until 1973. The ball field continued to be regularly used by neighboring Twin Lakes High School.

The field was bulldozed in 1992 for a parking garage for the new Raymond F. Kravis Center for the Performing Arts where there is a tribute display in the garage by the main elevator.
