= HMS Hibiscus =

Two vessels of the British Royal Navy have been named HMS Hibiscus, after the hibiscus flower.

- HMS Hibiscus (1917) was an Aubrietia-class sloop in use from 1917 to 1923.
- HMS Hibiscus (K24) was a Flower-class corvette launched in 1940, on loan to the United States Navy as Spry from 1942 to 1945, and sold in 1946.
