= List of mayors of West Palm Beach, Florida =

Mayor of the City of West Palm Beach
- Seal of West Palm Beach

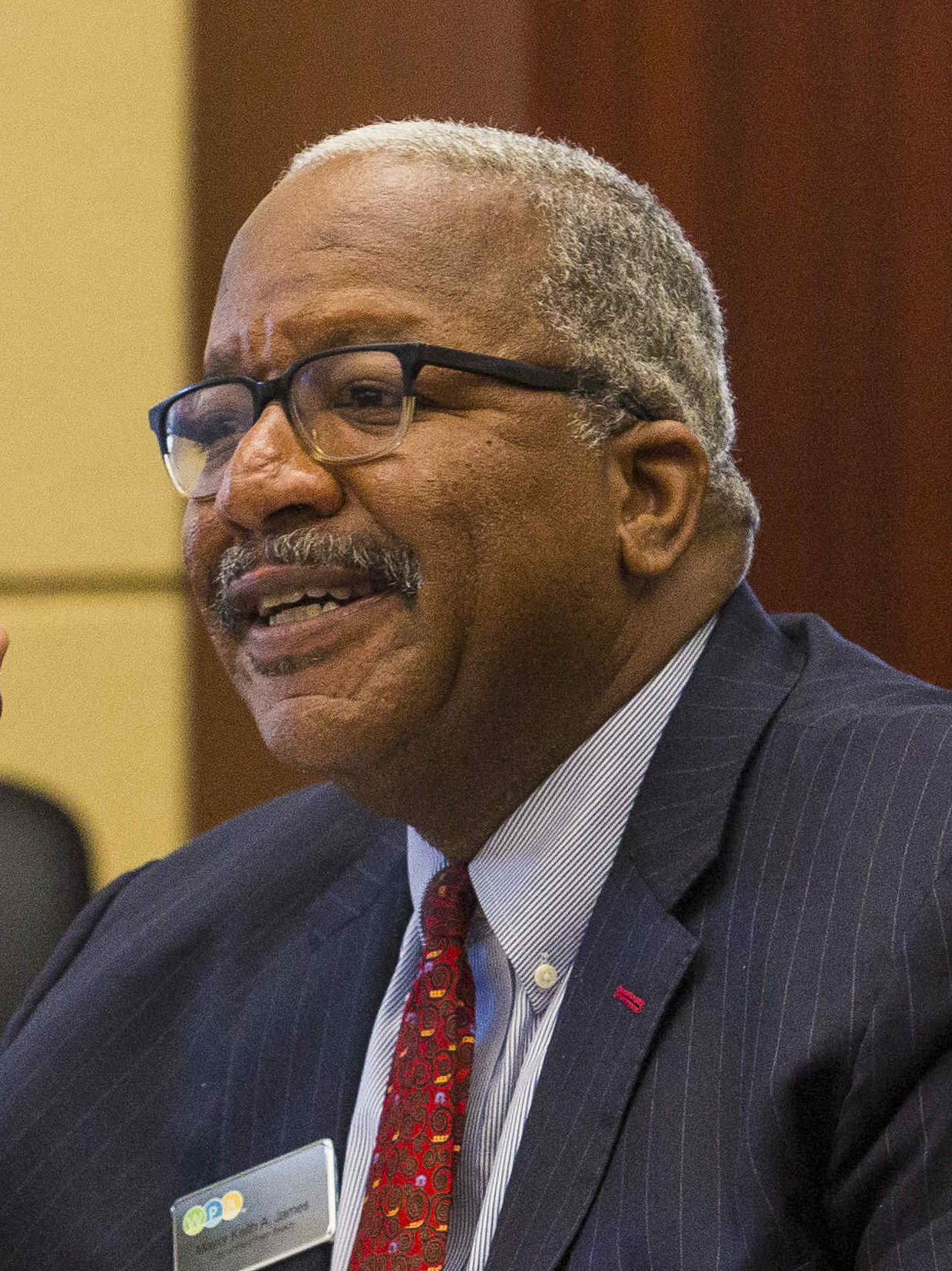
- Incumbent; Keith James since April 4, 2019
- Residence: West Palm Beach, Florida
- Term length: Four years
- Inaugural holder: John S. Earman
- Formation: 1894
- Salary: $125,000
- Website: https://www.wpb.org/our-city/mayor-s-office

The Mayor of West Palm Beach, Florida is a nonpartisan office that is the head of the executive branch of West Palm Beach's government. The type of government is Mayor-Commission. Powers and duties of the mayor include approving the agenda of and presiding over the meetings of the city commission, the ability to veto the city commission votes, including line-item vetoes in regards to the city budget, but vetoes can be overrode with a 4-1 vote. The mayor and city manager both have supervisory powers over the city's departments. Additionally, the mayor may initiate investigations involving the city of West Palm Beach. Since 1991, mayors have been popularly elected to four-year terms. City Hall is located at 401 Clematis Street, with the mayor's office on the second floor.

On November 6, 1894, the day after West Palm Beach was incorporated, voters elected John S. Earman as the first mayor. Beginning in 1919, the city operated under a council–manager form of government, with the mayor elected to the city commission and selected by other members of that body to serve a one-year term. The mayor served as a chairperson of the commission and had far less power than the city manager. A referendum in March 1991 resulted in a transition to a directly elected strong mayor. The first modern election for mayor occurred in November 1991, resulting in Nancy M. Graham becoming the city's first strong mayor. The current mayor is Keith James, who was elected on March 12, 2019.

== Early mayors (1894–1919) ==
Name	Start of term	End of term	Notes
John S. Earman	1894	1896	
J. F. Lamond	1896	1897	
Marion Eugene "M. E." Gruber	1897	1898	
Wilmon Whilldin	1898	1899	
Richard J. Chillingworth	1899	1901	Grandfather of Curtis Chillingworth, who was murdered in 1955 while serving as state judge
Louis W. Burkhardt	1901	1901	
George G. Currie	1901	1904	
William I. Metcalf	1904	1905	
George B. Baker	1905	1907	
J. T. DeBerry	1907	1909	
George W. Potter	1909	1910	
James B. McGinley	1910	1912	
C. S. Anderson	1912	1914	
Murray D. Carmichael	1914	1916	Later served in the Florida House of Representatives
W. A. Dutch	1916	September 22, 1919	

== Council-manager government mayors (1919–1991) ==
Image	Name	Start of term	End of term	Notes
	David F. Dunkle	September 22, 1919	September 8, 1921	
	Murray D. Carmichael	September 8, 1921	1922	Later served in Florida House of Representatives
	L. Garland Biggers	1922	1923	
	Joseph Mandel	1923	1924	First Jewish mayor
	Henry Stephen Harvey	1924	1926	
	Spencer T. Lainhart	1926	1927	
	J. C. McCreary	1927	1928	
	Vincent Oaksmith	1928	1929	
	John R. Beacham	1930	1931	Later became President of the Florida Senate
	Elza B. Donnell	1931	1933	
	Charles B. Watkins	1933	1934	
	Paschal C. "Pat" Reese	1934	1935	
	F. Theodore "Ted" Brown	1935	1937	
	Sanford D. "Sam" Morris	1937	1939	
	Ernest Metcalf	1939	1940	
	Ronald V. Ware	1940	1941	
	Willis H. "Bill" Hitt	1941	1942	
	J. O. Bowen	1942	1943	
	Vincent Oaksmith	1943	1944	
	George H. McCampbell	1944	1945	Brother of S. Perry McCampbell
	Stanley Peeler	1945	1946	
	E. Tinsley Halter	1946	1947	
	Willis H. "Bill" Hitt	1947	1948	
	Lloyd C. Bell	1948	1949	
	William P. "Bill" Holland	1949	1950	
	L. Thomas Keating	1950	1951	
	Hustin V. McMillan	1951	1952	
	H. Elmo Robinson	1952	1953	
	S. Perry McCampbell	1953	1954	Brother of George H. McCampbell
	Elias V. "Jack" Faircloth	1954	1955	
	C. Harold Earnest	1955	1956	
	Maurice E. "Buster" Holley	1956	1957	
	Elias V. "Jack" Faircloth	1957	1958	
	Horace S. Miller	1958	1959	
	William P. "Bill" Holland	1959	1960	
	Percy I. Hopkins, Jr.	1960	1961	
	Ray G. "Uncle Bim" Behm	1961	1961	Served three days
	Percy I. Hopkins, Jr.	1961	1962	
	C. Ben Holleman	1962	1963	
	Robert "Bob" Hawkey	1963	1963	Served for about two weeks
	Ray G. "Uncle Bim" Behm	1963	1964	
	Fred O. Easley, Jr.	1964	1966	
	C. Harold Earnest	1966	1967	
	Reid Moore, Jr.	1967	1968	Served in the Florida House of Representatives from 1977–1978 and 1981–1982
	David H. Brady	1968	1969	
	Eugene W. Potter	1969	1970	
	Fred O. Easley, Jr.	1970	1971	
	Francis H. Foster, Jr.	1971	1972	
	M. P. "Ham" Anthony	1972	1973	
	G. Ray Sparks, Jr.	1973	1974	
	Fred O. Easley, Jr.	1974	1975	
	Richard E. Linn	1975	1976	
	James M. Adams	1976	1977	
	M. P. "Ham" Anthony	1977	1978	
	Helen Wilkes	1978	1980	First woman to serve as mayor
	James M. Adams	1980	1981	
	Michael D. Hyman	1981	1982	
	Eva W. Mack	1982	1984	First African American mayor
	Dwight Baber	1984	1985	
	Carol Roberts	1985	1986	Served on the canvassing board for the 2000 Florida election recount and the Democratic Party nominee for Florida's 22nd congressional district in 2002
	Samuel A. Thomas	1986	1987	
	Richard V. Reikenis	1987	1988	
	Pat Pepper Schwab	1988	1989	
	James O. Poole	1989	1991	
	John F. "Jeff" Koons	1991	1991	Served for eight months

== Strong mayor (1991–present) ==
Image	Name	Start of term	End of term	Notes
	Nancy M. Graham	November 1991	March 25, 1999	First strong mayor
	Joel T. Daves III	March 25, 1999	March 27, 2003	Lost re-election
	Lois Frankel	March 27, 2003	March 31, 2011	Served in the Florida House of Representatives (1987–2003) and the U.S. House of Representatives (2013–present)
	Jeri Muoio	March 31, 2011	April 4, 2019	
	Keith A. James	April 4, 2019	Incumbent	

== See also ==
- History of West Palm Beach, Florida
- Timeline of West Palm Beach, Florida
- Palm Beach County, Florida
