= Helen Wilkes =

American businesswoman and politician (1927–2015)

Helen Wilkes

Helen Wilkes (April 4, 1927 – October 7, 2015) was an American businesswoman, nurse and politician. Wilkes, who served as a city commissioner of West Palm Beach, Florida, from 1976 to 1988, became the city's first female Mayor in 1978.

Wilkes was born Helen Barbour in Fort Valley, Georgia. She had five siblings. She became a nurse and relocated to West Palm Beach, Florida, in 1952 to accept a position as a registered nurse at the city's St. Mary's Hospital. She earned just $175 a month at St. Mary's. However, by taking no days off, she saved enough of her income to purchase a $3,500 house in nearby Lake Park, Florida, which she converted into a nursing home with a capacity for nine residents. Wilkes later recalled in an interview, "For seven years, I worked without a day off. I had a dream, and I wanted to fulfill it." She expanded the facility into the Helen Wilkes Nursing Home, an 85-bed nursing home over the next few decades. Wilkes sold her nursing home in the late 1980s for $3.36 million.

Wilkes next acquired the George Washington Hotel, a troubled, declining flophouse hotel located on Flagler Drive in downtown West Palm Beach during the 1970s. She renovated the hotel, which was in disrepair at the time, and reopened it under a new name, the Helen Wilkes Resident Hotel. She owned and operated the residential retirement hotel for more than 30 years, until the building was purchased by the city government of West Palm Beach and demolished in 2005.

She was best known for her political career in city government. She first joined the West Palm Beach City Commission in 1976, ultimately serving on the commission from 1976 to 1987. She was elected West Palm Beach's first female Mayor by the City Commission on March 30, 1978.

In a 1987 interview, Wilkes considered her greatest political achievements to be the creation of West Palm Beach's first crime watch patrol. Wilkes also worked with Eva Williams Mack, who was elected West Palm Beach's first African-American Mayor by the City Commission on March 25, 1982, to improve relations between the city's black and white communities. Wilkes retired from the City Commission on Thursday, March 24, 1988.

Helen Wilkes died on October 7, 2015, at age 88.
