= West Palm Beach Municipal Stadium =

Baseball park in West Palm Beach, Florida

- Municipal Stadium
- Interactive map of West Palm Beach; Municipal Stadium
- Full name: West Palm Beach; Municipal Stadium
- Location: 755 Hank Aaron Drive; West Palm Beach, Florida
- Coordinates: 26.7215°N 80.0795°W
- Capacity: 4,200 (1963); 5,000 (1986)
- Surface: Natural grass
- Field size: Left Field — 330 ft Center Field — 405 ft Right Field — 330 ft

Construction
- Built: 1962
- Opened: March 9, 1963
- Closed: 1997
- Demolished: 2002
- Cost: $1.0 million

Tenants
- Milwaukee / Atlanta Braves (MLB) (spring training: 1963–1997); Montreal Expos (MLB) (spring training: 1969–1972 & 1981–1997); West Palm Beach Expos (FSL) (1969–1997); West Palm Beach Tropics (SPBA) (1989–1990)

West Palm Beach Municipal Stadium, referred to as "Municipal Stadium," was a baseball park in the southeastern United States, in West Palm Beach, Florida. Located at 755 Hank Aaron Drive, it was the long-time spring training home for the Milwaukee and Atlanta Braves and Montreal Expos. The Braves played spring training games at the stadium from 1963 to 1997, while the Expos played there from 1969 to 1972 and from 1981 to 1997.

The stadium was constructed in 1962 to replace midtown Connie Mack Field, which had been the West Palm Beach spring training home of the Philadelphia and Kansas City Athletics from 1946 to 1962.

The first game was played on Saturday, March 9, 1963, under overcast skies and extremely high winds which blew sand from the outfield areas, directly toward seating area, which were not as yet totally landscaped at that time. Mayor C. Ben Holleman threw out the first ball and the Kansas City Athletics defeated the Milwaukee Braves 3–0 in front of a medium-sized crowd of 3,265 fans. Warren Spahn started for Milwaukee and was the losing pitcher, while Dan Pfister was the winner for the Athletics.

The ballpark later hosted the 1982 and 1992 Florida State League All-Star Games.

Atlanta and Montreal played their final spring training game at the ballpark on Wednesday March 26, 1997, which saw Montreal come through with a 2–0 victory.

The stadium was later demolished in 2002 and there is nothing to mark its former place, which is now partially covered by a large Home Depot location.

West Palm Beach would not see spring training again until 2017, with the opening of The Ballpark of the Palm Beaches, and since January 2024 now CACTI Park of the Palm Beaches, which is the spring training home of both the Houston Astros and Washington Nationals.
