= Old West Palm Beach National Guard Armory =

- West Palm Beach Armory Art Center
- U.S. National Register of Historic Places
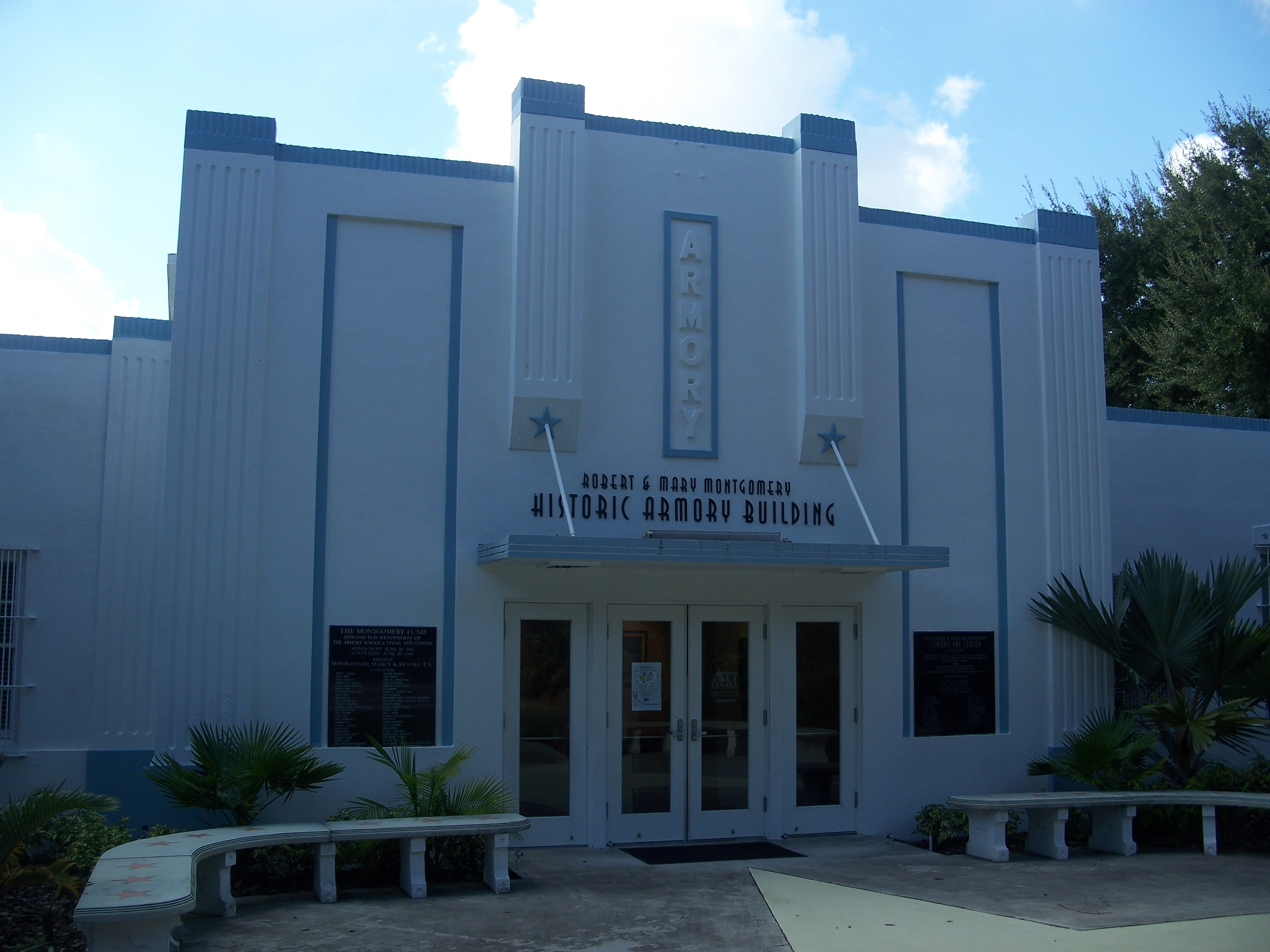

- Location within Florida Location within the United States
- Location: West Palm Beach, Florida, United States
- Coordinates: 26°41′53″N 80°3′41″W
- Built: 1939
- Architect: William Manly King
- Architectural style: Art Moderne
- NRHP reference No.: 92000142
- Added to NRHP: June 11, 1992

The West Palm Beach Armory Art Center (also known as the Palm Beach County Armory Art Center) is a historic site in West Palm Beach, Florida, United States. Today, it is located at 811 Park Place. It was previously located at 1703 South Lake Avenue. On June 11, 1992, it was added to the United States National Register of Historic Places.

== History ==
The Armory building was constructed in 1939 in Art Deco style by architect William Manley King with Works Progress Administration (WPA) funds. It was occupied by the National Guard Armory from 1939 to 1982. During the 1950s and 1960s, the building was used for Palm Beach High School dances and other community events. In 1987, the Norton School of Art closed their doors, leaving 250 students and 40 faculty members without a location to hold art classes. Robert and Mary Montgomery heard about the lack of space for an art center and made a $100,000 donation to open the Robert and Mary Montgomery Armory Art Center. The Center opened in 1987 and has rented the building from Palm Beach County for $1 a year for the last 20 years. In 2002, Robert and Mary Montgomery donated $1 million to transfer their name to the historic building and remove it from the name of the organization which became simply Armory Art Center.
