= John R. Beacham =

John Reid Beacham (July 22, 1896 - October 1950) was a politician in Florida. He served as President of the Florida Senate. The Florida Archives have a photo of him.

He was born in Unadilla, Georgia. He attended Mercer University and Detroit College of Law before moving to West Palm Beach. Florida.

He served in the city commission and as vice-mayor and as mayor. He built and ran WJNO. He had a store and was involved in real estate.

He testified about his role as a leader in West Palm Beach when it defaulted on its debt and about his legislative efforts in the Florida Senate in regard to municipal debt. He testified that the bondholders committee was the greatest menace visited on Florida since the "invasion of the "carpetbaggers"l.

In 1934 he helped pass a Homestead Tax Exemption.

He was married to Bettye Driscoll Beacham.

He was a member of the Florida Bar Association, a Mason, a member of the Elks and the American Legion. The Florida Senate recorded a memorial in his honor after he died.
