= Chloe Lane =

Days or Our Lives character

- Days of Our Lives character
- Portrayed by: Nadia Bjorlin
- Duration: 1999–2005; 2007–2011; 2013; 2015–2023
- First appearance: November 24, 1999
- Last appearance: October 12, 2023
- Created by: Tom Langan
- Introduced by: Ken Corday and Tom Langan (1999); Ken Corday and Edward J. Scott (2007); Ken Corday, Lisa de Cazotte and Greg Meng (2013); Ken Corday, Albert Alarr and Greg Meng (2015)
- Spin-off appearances: Last Blast Reunion (2019)
In-universe information
- Other names: Dana Scott; Chloe Black; Chloe Horton; Chloe Jonas
- Occupation: Restaurant owner; Music teacher; Opera singer; Prostitute; Hospital volunteer; Talk show host
- Father: Craig Wesley
- Mother: Nancy Wesley
- Sisters: Joy Wesley
- Spouse: Brady Black (2005–2008); Lucas Horton (2009); Daniel Jonas (2010–2011)
- Sons: Parker Jonas
- Adoptive daughters: Holly Jonas
- Grandparents: Albert Miller
- Nieces and nephews: Kelsey Wesley

Chloe Lane is a fictional character from the American NBC soap opera Days of Our Lives, portrayed by actress and singer Nadia Bjorlin. She was first introduced in November 1999, created by then-head writer Tom Langan. Bjorlin played Chloe nearly continuously from 1999 through 2005, and from 2007 until 2011. In 2012, Bjorlin announced during an interview with TV Guide that she would return to Days of our Lives once again, making her return on January 7, 2013, but just remaining through April 16, 2013. Bjorlin returned to the role, in a two-episode stint in celebration of the soap's fiftieth anniversary celebration on August 3, 2015. She returned for another visit in January 2016, and returned full-term in June 2016, departing in August 2019. She returned in August 2020 for a brief stint before returning permanently later that same year. Bjorlin departed once again in October 2023. Chloe will return in 2027, with Sofia Mattsson assuming the role.

Chloe arrived in Salem in the year 1999, having lived in an orphanage for fifteen years. She reunited with her birth mother, Nancy Wesley and they faced issues in their mother-daughter relationship. Chloe's social life was also bad as she was bullied at school for her personality and appearance, leading to her being called "Ghoul Girl" by her peers. She did, however, form a relationship with Philip Kiriakis. Chloe, who is an opera singer, has diverted away from her dark image over the years. She has been married three times, two of which have ended in divorce with one being annulled. She also shares a child, Parker, with her late ex-husband Daniel Jonas. She is also the surrogate mother of Nicole Walkers daughter, Holly Jonas. Chloe had also been Holly's legal mother during custody battles and when Nicole was temporarily presumed dead.

== Casting and creation ==
The role of Chloe Lane was introduced by head writer Tom Langan in November 1999. She has been portrayed by Nadia Bjorlin since the beginning. The character appeared to be 16 years old in 2001. Bjorlin's contract on Days of our Lives lasted until June 13, 2003 and she departed the series. She briefly returned from December 24, 2003 to January 12, 2004. She had another stint from August 13 to September 2004. She returned on a recurring status from December 2004 to September 16, 2005, when she left Days of our Lives to pursue a role in the UPN series Sex, Love & Secrets.

She returned on November 29, 2007 after an absence. Discussing her return, the actress said: "I love working with the people I used to and [who] I know, but it's also fun to work with new people, because you don't know what they're going to do in a scene". While absent, she had landed roles in primetime series, as well as working in films. She departed again in September 2011, and made her return on January 4, 2013, but departed the role a couple months later on April 16, 2013. The May 13, 2013, issue of Soaps In Depth confirmed that Bjorlin would make a brief return later in the year, airing from September 24–25 of that year.

In March 2015, it was announced that Bjorlin would return as part of the show's fiftieth anniversary; she returned for a two-day stint on August 3 and 4, 2015.

In September 2015, it was hinted in an interview with Patrika Darbo that Bjorlin would be returning to the show at an unknown date. Bjorlin made her brief return on January 8 till 28, 2016. In December 2015, it was confirmed that Bjorlin would return as Chloe, but in a contract role, airing on June 10, 2016.

In January 2019, it was reported that Bjorlin would be departing the show; she made her last appearance on August 29, 2019. In November 2019, it was announced that Bjorlin would again reprise the role for the digital series, Last Blast Reunion.

In February 2020, it was reported that Bjorlin would be briefly returning to the show; she made her two day appearance on August 3 and 4, 2020. Months later in August 2020, it was reported that Bjorlin would be making a permanent return; she made her return on December 3, 2020. On October 6, 2023, it was reported that Bjorlin would depart the serial along with John-Paul Lavoisier; she last appeared on October 12.

In March 2026, it was announced Sofia Mattsson had joined Days of Our Lives in an undisclosed role. That August, Bjorlin revealed she had been asked to reprise the role of Chloe but turned it down, revealing that the role had been recast. In November 2026, it was revealed Mattsson had been recast as Chloe and will first appear in 2027.

== Development ==
=== Characterization ===
Chloe as she appeared in 1999. Her image was extremely dark, and she was labeled "Ghoul girl" by bullies.

Chloe has been described by William Keck of USA Today as: "soap's tragically disfigured soprano diva." Chloe's teenage years weren't bright, she was often a victim of bullying at school. She had a dark personality; wearing black clothes all the time and also wearing large glasses. She had a "defensive" attitude, which allowed her to be bullied by her peers and was referred to as "Ghoul girl", and was a social outcast. They even left live chickens at her doorstep. Her turning point came when Belle Black (Kirsten Storms) and Philip Kiriakis (Jay Kenneth Johnson) befriended her. At the school dance in June 2000, she wore a bright red dress and had changed her appearance, stunning everybody. A writer of The Spokesman-Review newspaper called her a "stunning beauty". Michael Logan of TV Guide noted twelve years later in 2012 that: "She's had the craziest trajectory from Ghoul Girl." In recent times, however, Chloe has diverted far away from her early image and her storylines focus more on her relationships, especially her habit of cheating. In 2010, Bjorlin said: "You know what? Chloe is not a naughty girl! She just makes bad decisions. She is always the one that gets stuck paying the ultimate consequences for her actions. She does not think things through realistically".

Soap opera journalist Michael Fairman noted that Chloe tends to befriend women who have done her wrong, such as Nicole Walker (Arianne Zucker) and Carly Manning (Crystal Chappell), to which Bjorlin responded: "At least Carly was horrible within reason, but Nicole I don't understand. It sort of adds to the fact that Chloe in her last few years, was being written like such a push-over and naïve. I am trying to see that she tries to see the best in all people and everyone makes mistakes." When asked in 2009 who she would like to see Chloe possibly paired with, Bjorlin said E.J. DiMera (James Scott), stating: "I've had a lot of fun with the whole Chloe and Philip and Chloe and Brady thing, but you know I think it would be kind of fun to create some controversy and stir things up. Maybe a Chloe and EJ thing".

=== Brady Black and Philip Kiriakis ===
Despite her being hated at school, she developed a romance with Philip. After their first kiss, she was appalled to find out that he only invited her to the dance because he lost a bet. During this time, she found herself falling in love with Brady Black (Kyle Lowder), though still dating Philip. She suspected that Philip's father, Victor Kiriakis (John Aniston) was using Brady to break up her romance with Philip; Philip also too suspected this and warned Brady to stay away from Chloe. After her relationship with Philip ended she eventually became involved with Brady. They married in 2005; however, shortly after their marriage was destroyed because of Brady's drug addiction. When she returned in 2007, many thought it might have been her fault. In 2008, they divorced. Of this storyline, Bjorlin said: "I personally was kind of glad that they didn't take it in the approach that Chloe had done something, that it was Chloe's fault or that Chloe killed him or had been unfaithful or whatever it may have been. I'm sort of glad that in the best manner they could, they didn't really taint the relationship in that sense and they left the characters with integrity." In 2003, Philip was re-cast with Kyle Brandt, who remained in the role in 2006. Upon Bjorlin's own return to the series in 2007, Johnson had returned to the role. Of this, Bjorlin stated that it was easy for her to fall right back into place as far as Philip and Chloe's relationship goes: "It's sort of undeniable. Jay and I have always had a really great time working together. We sometimes can't keep it together and be serious, especially now that Philip is so serious. He's a man now, so angry and stern. We'll start cracking up and we can't stop laughing." She again said in 2009: "I think there's such a camaraderie and trust and respect between both of us that's been built for years that we truly enjoy working with each other".

=== Daniel Jonas and infidelity ===
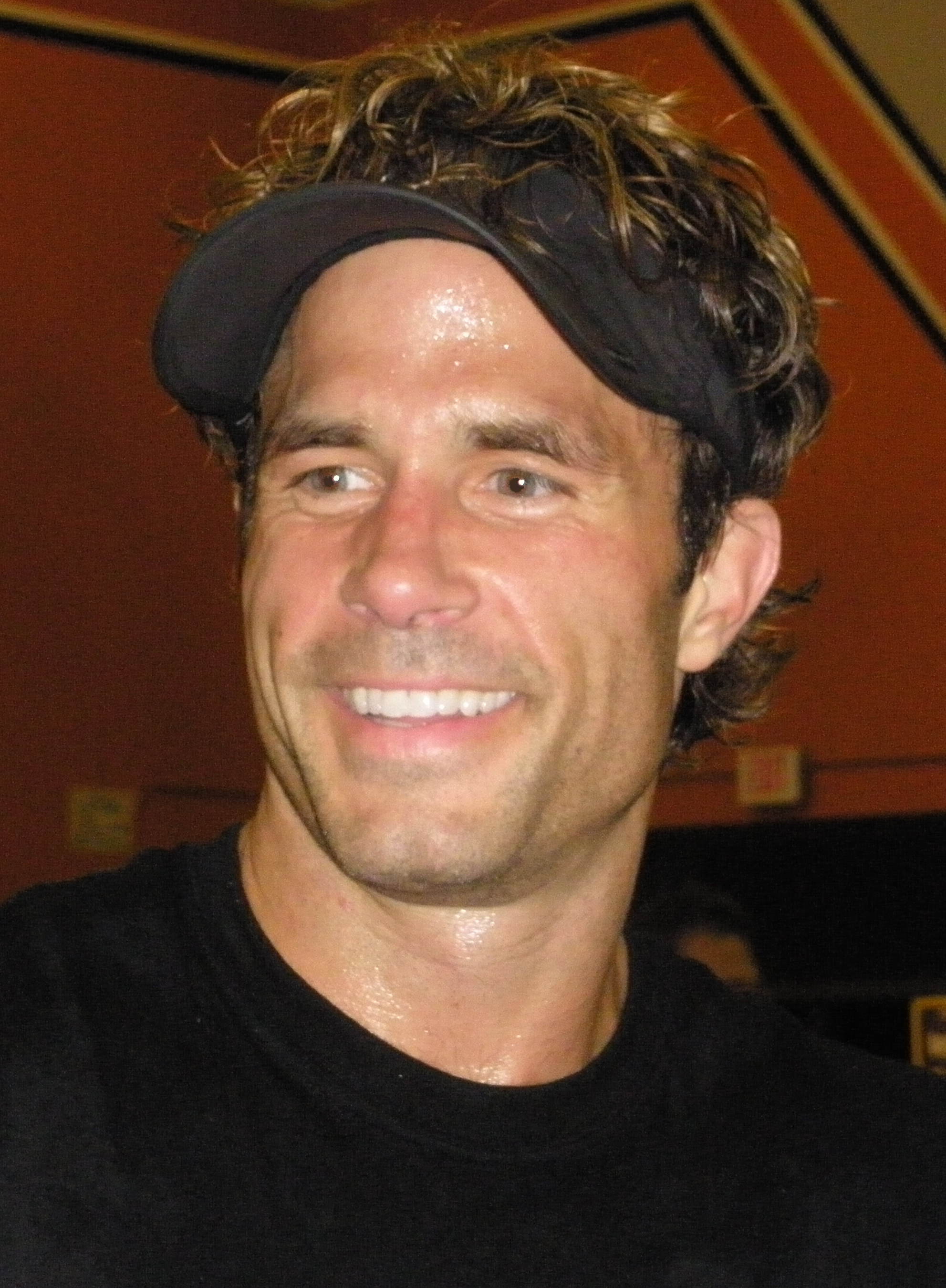
Shawn Christian (pictured) plays Daniel Jonas.

Chloe began romancing Lucas Roberts (Bryan Dattilo) after the demise of his relationship with Sami Brady (Alison Sweeney). On New Year's Eve of 2008, they became engaged. She cheated on Lucas with Dr. Daniel Jonas (Shawn Christian) and soon went into a coma after being poisoned by Kate Roberts (Lauren Koslow), Lucas' mother. Her relationship with Daniel was popular with viewers, labeled as "Danloe". She awakened and her brief marriage to Lucas ended. She became involved with Daniel, but ended up cheating on him too. Chloe—after being duped by Vivian Alamain into thinking Daniel and Carly were having an affair—had a one-night stand with Philip while they were drunk and she ended up pregnant. Of this, Bjorlin stated: "She probably did not deal with her grief in the most appropriate way possible. Chloe does crazy things". Carly, feeling guilty because Chloe's being duped into thinking her and Daniel were having an affair as a cruel attempt on Vivian's part to get Chloe to kill Carly, agreed to help Chloe secretly obtain a DNA test. Chloe came to form a friendship with Carly. Bjorlin said of their friendship: "I was feeling slightly juvenile for awhile [sic] just spewing venom on her. It is nice that we formed this friendship."

Michael Fairman of On-Air On-Soaps said during his interview with Bjorlin and Christian "Dr. Daniel is becoming a dim-wit! Can't he figure something is going on behind his back?". Bjorlin said: "It is kind of hysterical that everybody in Salem knows about this cheating incident except Daniel, at this point." Because the DNA test had supposedly been switched, Chloe believed herself that Daniel could very well be the baby's father. She said: "[Chloe] got the relief of a lifetime when she found out the baby was Daniel's. So she thought, "Now I am going to have my wedding. Nothing can go wrong." Chloe gave birth to a son, who she named Parker Jonas initially. However, the supposed truth came out at Parker's baptism in front of family and friends that Philip was Parker's father. This led to the end of the marriage. Having lost Daniel, Chloe sank into a state of post partum depression and tried to commit suicide. Upon returning to Salem in January 2013, she's attempting to reestablish her relationship with Daniel, since it turns out that Parker really is his son.

=== 2011 departure ===
After four years on June 7, 2011, TVLine among other sources confirmed that she was to depart once again. Her last air date was September 28, 2011. Bjorlin said of her decision not to renew her contract: "It's a bittersweet moment for me, but fortunately I have been at these crossroads before, and I've always rose to the challenge in everything I pursued [sic] I will miss the cast and crew dearly, and they — including executive producer Ken Corday — will always be considered family to me. At the same time, I am excited for where this next chapter in my life takes me". While away, Bjorlin worked on the series Venice: The Series with fellow Days co-star Crystal Chappell and also appeared on the reality television show Dirty Soap, a series which followed the real lives of soap stars. She also starred in the film Divorce Invitation. Dirty Soap provided viewers with insight about her decision to leave the show.

=== 2013 return ===
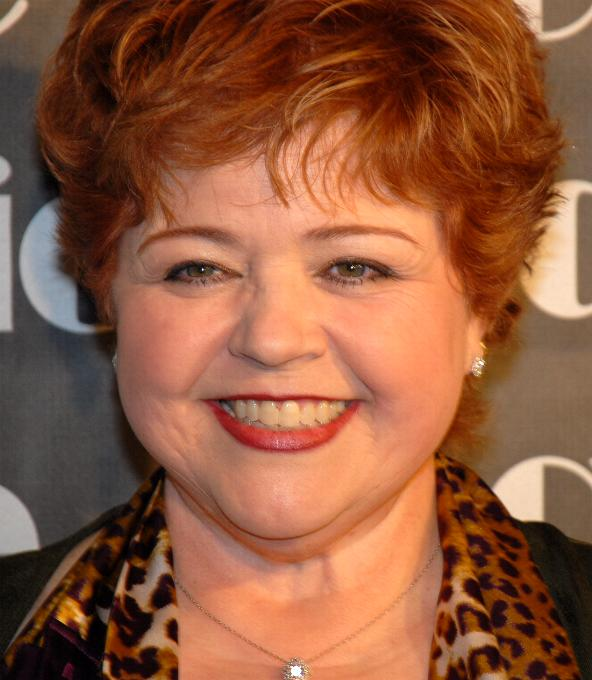
Patrika Darbo (pictured) plays Chloe's mother Nancy Wesley. She returned with Chloe in 2013.

Bjorlin announced during an interview with TV Guide on August 21, 2012, that she would return to the role of Chloe, with her first airdate being January 4, 2013. She began filming in September. Speaking out about all of the rumors that had circulated, Bjorlin stated: "I find out a lot about myself through reading magazines [sic] There was a little bit of talk throughout the year. "Would you ever be interested in returning?" That sort of thing. But never anything concrete [sic] Now the timing is right. It's been a year since we've seen Chloe. Hopefully, the audience has forgotten what she was up to." Speaking of her exit storyline the previous year, Bjorlin said that she herself would have written the character out: "Chloe is so near and dear to my heart and even I would have written her off after that storyline. She was spiraling out of control and the fans had stopped being able to recognize the character. I couldn't recognize her, either! A lot of what made Chloe so lovable — her integrity, her fun, her wit — was gone and I don't blame anyone for dropping her from the show." She teased the character's return, hinting that she would return as "herself", and will have good self-esteem with a stronger and more confident mentality.

In addition to Chloe's return to Salem, Patrika Darbo returned as Nancy, after an eight-year absence. Darbo said that Nancy is "going to be supporting her daughter; whether she's right or whether she's gone. Family takes care of family." Of working with Bjorlin again, Darbo said they "just fell right back into it." She also noted that in the past seven years, she didn't think that "some of the things that happened to Chloe would have happened, if Nancy had been there" and said "However, she's back now, and she might start taking care of those people who hurt her daughter."

== Storylines ==
=== 1999–2005 ===
Chloe lived in an orphanage for the first fifteen years of her life. Nancy Wesley (Patrika Darbo) offered her the chance to move in with her, and Chloe accepted, later learning Nancy is actually her biological mother. Originally introduced as a brainy "nerd" character with few friends, Chloe hides her incredible beauty behind frumpy clothes and horn-rimmed glasses making her an outsider at Salem High where she is picked on and often referred to as "Ghoul Girl." She becomes friends with Shawn-Douglas Brady (Jason Cook), and Belle Black. Chloe goes to a dance with the wealthy Philip Kiriakis, at which time she unveils her true appearance, and Philip immediately falls for her. They date until Chloe learns the first date was all because Philip lost a bet with Shawn. Philip wanting Chloe back, does everything possible to win her back. The two fall in love again, but it is short-lived when Brady Black comes to town. Chloe immediately bonded with Brady over their shared love of the opera. Chloe, still dating Philip, assures him that nothing is going on between them. Brady, and Chloe's relationship begins to grow closer, causing more tension in Philip and Chloe's relationship. Philip attempts to sabotage Brady to make it look like he is a thief, Chloe ends her relationship with him and pursues one with Brady.

Meanwhile, Chloe is diagnosed with leukemia, and with the help of Brady searches for her birth father to provide her with bone marrow. It is ultimately revealed that Nancy's husband Dr. Craig Wesley (Kevin Spirtas) is Chloe's father, Nancy having given Chloe up for adoption without telling Craig. Chloe survives when her sister, Joy, is born and proves to be a match. Shortly after, Chloe leaves town to pursue her dream of being an opera singer in June 2003. Her relationship with Brady suffers from it. Brady is about to confront Chloe about ending their relationship, when Chloe is in a horrible car accident, her face was disfigured. Disgusted with her scars, she makes Brady believe she is dead. She does so for many months, until Brady finds out she is alive. Chloe gets several reconstructive surgeries, restoring her face to its original beauty. Chloe reveals her new face to Brady, at their wedding. After they are married, Chloe and Brady move to Vienna so Chloe can once again pursue her passion for opera singing.

=== 2007–11 ===
Chloe returns in 2007 without Brady. She begins to rekindle her friendship with Belle, Shawn, and Philip. Brady comes back to town, revealing that he has a drug addiction, and that is why he and Chloe broke up. Chloe pursues a relationship with Lucas Horton, but it ends when she cheats on him with Daniel Jonas. Chloe eventually began a relationship with Daniel. Daniel and Chloe were engaged, but their relationship was complicated when Daniel's friend, Carly Manning, came to town, and they discovered that Daniel had fathered Carly's daughter, Melanie Jonas (Molly Burnett).

The situation was only complicated when Chloe had a hysterical pregnancy and was told that she would probably never have a child. One night, having been tricked by Vivian Alamain (Louise Sorel) to think that Carly and Daniel were having an affair, Chloe turned to Philip. The two slept together and when Chloe later learned she was pregnant, she did not know if the father was Daniel or Philip. Test results confirmed Daniel as the baby's father so Chloe didn't tell Daniel about the affair. Chloe married Daniel and gave birth to a son Parker. On the day of Parker's baptism, Caroline revealed that she had switched the test results, and that Philip was Parker's father. Daniel was heartbroken and left Chloe. Unable to deal with the pain of losing Daniel, Chloe slipped deep into depression and tried to commit suicide. Social services gave Philip full custody but Philip moved Chloe into the Kiriakis mansion with Parker so they could raise him together.

Chloe's mental health was still fragile and during a drunken rant to Kate, Chloe threatened to take Parker and no one would ever see him again. Fearful that she would make good on her threats, Philip took Parker and moved to Chicago. Chloe tried to get herself together by giving voice lessons to students in Salem and petitioning the court for supervised visits with Parker. Then Chloe met a handsome stranger named Quinn Hudson (Bren Foster), whom she hooked up with, later finding out that he had taped the encounter and used it to blackmail her into prostitution. Quinn (later revealed to be Vivian's estranged son) had been hired by Kate Roberts to ruin Chloe's life and keep her away from Parker. However her call girl days end when she was viciously attacked by Gus, Vivian's manservant-turned-vigilante who was assaulting hookers, putting her into a second coma (although it was shorter this time). When she awoke from the coma she identified Gus and received a sizable reward which gave her the means to move to Chicago, to pursue a more lucrative singing career and work towards regaining custody of her son, Parker.

=== 2013–current ===
On January 7, 2013, Chloe returned to Salem and revealed to Daniel that he is actually Parker's father, hoping they could be a family again. When Chloe learned Daniel had moved on with Jennifer she set about trying to break them up. Chloe blackmailed Jennifer into rejecting Daniel, by threatening to keep Daniel from seeing Parker, going so far as to have her mother Nancy take Parker to Brazil, but not telling Daniel, so Jennifer felt she had to publicly reject Daniel and leave the hospital, to protect Daniel from losing access to his son Parker, while never revealing her true feelings. After seeing a passport at Chloe's mother Nancy's place, Daniel figured out Chloe's scheme, with help from Rafe, and reconciled with Jennifer, who also got her job back at the hospital. After that Chloe decided to go back to Chicago, leaving Parker with Daniel.

On August 3, 2015, Chloe returned to Salem when she learned Daniel and Nicole were engaged and she objected to Nicole becoming Parker's stepmother. She ultimately accepted after a talk with Daniel.

In January 2016, Chloe came back to Salem to comfort Nicole after Daniel died in a car accident on New Years Day. Chloe again left Salem in August 2019.

Chloe briefly returns in August 2020 and is also mentioned during the same year when Nicole tells Allie Horton that Holly went to visit Chloe and Parker in New York. Chloe later returns permanently to Salem in December 2020 at Nicole's behest to help her run Basic Black.
