= James Stevenson (actor) =

American actor (born 1981)

- Born: March 25, 1981 (age 45)

James Stevenson (born March 25, 1981) is an American actor known for portraying Jared Casey on the NBC daytime drama Passions.

On March 14, 2007, Stevenson was nominated for a Daytime Emmy for "Outstanding Younger Actor in a Drama Series" for his role on Passions. He lost to Bryton McClure as Devon Hamilton. Stevenson has since left the series; his last airdate on Passions was July 23, 2007.

Stevenson dated Days of Our Lives star Nadia Bjorlin, who appeared with him on the series Sex, Love & Secrets. He grew up on a horse farm in Tolland, Connecticut.

== Selected filmography ==
- Passions .... Jared Casey (2006–2007)
- CSI: NY - "Live or Let Die" (2006) TV Episode .... Dwayne Gessner
- Sex, Love & Secrets (2005) TV Series .... Hank
- Hope & Faith - "Do I Look Frat in This?" (2004) TV Episode .... Beefy Frat Guy
