= Nancy Wesley =

- Days of our Lives character
- Portrayed by: Patrika Darbo
- Duration: 1998–2005; 2013; 2016–2017; 2019; 2022; 2024
- First appearance: June 18, 1998
- Last appearance: October 24, 2024
- Created by: Sally Sussman Morina
- Introduced by: Ken Corday and Tom Langan (1998); Ken Corday, Lisa de Cazotte and Greg Meng (2013); Ken Corday, Albert Alarr and Greg Meng (2016, 2019); Ken Corday and Albert Alarr (2022); Ken Corday and Janet Spellman-Drucker (2024)
- Spin-off appearances: Last Blast Reunion (2019)
In-universe information
- Occupation: Hospital volunteer
- Father: Albert Miller
- Husband: Craig Wesley (until 2022)
- Daughters: Chloe Lane; Joy Wesley
- Grandsons: Parker Jonas
- Granddaughters: Kelsey Wesley

Nancy Wesley is a fictional character from the American NBC soap opera Days of Our Lives, played by Patrika Darbo. Nancy was created when the serial's producer Tom Langan wanted a "real woman" as opposed to a "super-skinny" actress to join the cast. Casting director Fran Bascom contacted Darbo with the offer and she accepted. Langan did not require the actress to audition for the role. Nancy is introduced as the wife of Craig Wesley (Kevin Spirtas) and is described as a loyal spouse. Langan liked the dynamic between the two characters; he believed that "handsome" Craig loved the "not super-thin" Nancy very much. Darbo has spoken about the characters sharing a mutual love and credits her own rapport with Spirtas to the character's popularity. Nancy has been featured in storylines involving breast cancer, a feud with Mike Horton (Roark Critchlow), getting run over by a truck, and having a child to provide her leukemia stricken daughter, Chloe Lane (Nadia Bjorlin) with a bone marrow transplant. The character was also involved in a storyline that was part of a promotional campaign for food franchisor Mrs. Fields and charity Leukemia & Lymphoma Society.

The character has been met with positive reviews. Mark Edward Wilows from the Post-Tribune reported that critics were "raving" about the "pivotal role" Nancy. Alessandra Stanley of The New York Times said that Nancy was the most notable celebration of larger-size females on daytime television. Larger female viewers have praised the character because they felt there was a place for themselves on television. For her portrayal of Nancy, Darbo has won a newcomer award at the Soap Opera Digest Awards and has been nominated for a Daytime Emmy Award.

== Creation and casting ==
Darbo was hired by Days of our Lives in May 1998. The serial's casting director, Fran Bascom told Carol Bidwell of Los Angeles Daily News that their producer, Tom Langan wanted "a real woman, not one of these super-skinny actresses" to join the cast. Bascom said that she immediately thought of accredited actress Darbo. Langan approved Darbo's hiring and decided that she did not need to audition for the role. Nancy is introduced as the wife of Craig Wesley (Kevin Spirtas). Bascom said that Langan "liked the fact that this handsome man loves this woman who's not super-thin - really, really loves her, and the fans love it, too." Darbo told of Lilana Novakovich of The Record that when Bascom asked her to join the cast, she thought it would be a small role involving food. Darbo worried that producers were not familiar with her and expected someone to say "Oh, my God, you're not who we thought you were. Thank you for coming." In 2003 it was announced that the Wesley family were being written out of the series. Darbo returned to filming for scenes that aired in 2004 and 2005. Darbo has said "was some of the most fun I’ve ever had. It was also the hardest work I’ve ever done." On November 16, 2012, it was announced that Darbo would be returning to Days of our Lives after a seven year absence. As a result of the show's production being far ahead, she will reappear in 2013. She returned on March 5, 2013, and vacated the role a month later on April 10, 2013.

On October 11, 2024, it was announced Darbo would again reprise the role when Nancy returned on October 22, and departed again two days later.

== Character development ==
=== Characterization ===
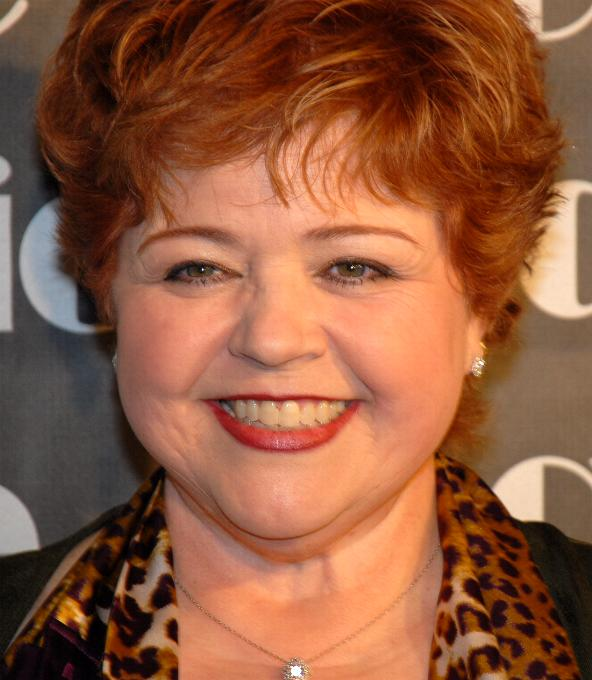
Patrika Darbo (pictured) said that she was glad Nancy broke the stereotype associated with overweight characters.

Darbo told Mark Edward Wilows of the Post-Tribune that she was enjoying playing Nancy as daytime roles are challenging. She felt that she was a role model playing Nancy, showing that weight does not matter. Darbo stated that she would never play a character that would make a mockery of weight issues. She was "glad" that Nancy broke the stereotype associated with overweight roles.

Nancy is described as the "cunning and manipulative" wife to Craig. Nancy works as the head volunteer at University Hospital, which she does to keep watch over her husband, to whom she is "extremely loyal". She would "stop at nothing" to remove Mike Horton (Roark Critchlow) from the role Chief of Staff and have Craig take his place. Their early storyline focused on hatching a number of manipulative schemes to ruin Mike's career. Darbo enjoyed working alongside Spirtas and stated that "I couldn't have asked for a better leading man". Their characters have "one of those marriages" where there is mutual love, but she is fine with him flirting with others. Darbo added that Craig treats Nancy "like a queen 'cause her daddy has the money', but there is an attraction between them." Darbo believed that Nancy's success had much to do with her rapport and "great chemistry" with Spirtas. She added that "I believe we are the real married couple that the audience can relate to. We're a team, we do everything together". Spirtas told Novakovich that he was pleased that Nancy is an "unconventional wife in both appearance and attitude". He branded her as a "glamorous and evil villainess". The actor was also happy to be working with Darbo because she did not have the "typical" soap opera appearance. He added that "there is something to be said about our dynamic". When Spirtas first joined the series, his character was introduced separately from Nancy.

In 2002, food franchisor Mrs. Fields teamed up with Days of our Lives and charity Leukemia & Lymphoma Society to host a cookie bake off. As a tie in with the event, the serial introduced a similar storyline. Nancy and Alice Horton (Frances Reid) have a cookie-baking contest; Darbo told a reporter from Reuters that "it'll be kind of a cook-war". Darbo said that it was a partnership between the businesses to gain a greater audience and benefit the charity. She also revealed that the storyline would have a further tie in storyline, as her on-screen daughter Chloe Lane (Nadia Bjorlin) is diagnosed with leukemia. Nancy was "devastated" when she discovers that Chloe's biological father cannot provide his bone marrow. It was later revealed that Nancy and Craig would have another child to provide a lifesaving bone marrow transplant for Chloe. Bjorlin told Novakovich that she bonded well with Darbo and Spirtas and they gave her advice on her acting.

=== Return ===
Darbo returned to the role, with her onscreen return being sometime in early 2013. The actress, who was welcomed back on set, said that Nancy is "going to be supporting her daughter; whether she’s right or whether she’s gone. Family takes care of family." Of working with Bjorlin again, Darbo said they "just fell right back into it." When asked if Nancy would be different this time around or "the same conniving woman she always was", Darbo said "The bitch is back. Do not mess with mine. Don’t mess with anybody who belongs to me." Additionally, she explained "Nancy’s not a runner. Nancy sort of just saunters in, looks around, and makes a plan. She’s like the queen of the spiders. She sits in the middle of her web, weaving and weaving."

== Storylines ==
Nancy arrives as the head volunteer at University Hospital and keeps a watch over her husband and colleague Craig. Nancy plots to remove Mike from his role at the hospital so Craig can take his place. She befriends a nurse named Ali McIntyre (Lisa Linde) to help with her scheming. Nancy is later diagnosed with breast cancer. Mikes surprises Nancy by offering her support and they warm to each other. When she recovers Nancy decides to restart her plotting and convinces Ali to file a sexual harassment case about Mike. He ends up resigning in the midst of the scandal and leaves Salem. Upon his return, Mike is asked to resume his role at the hospital, but he chooses to marry Carrie instead. As a result Craig wins the job.

Nancy receives a telephone call and leaves with $25,000. Nancy once had a child and gave her up for adoption. Nancy uses the money in an attempt to bribe a member of staff at the orphanage to keep her daughter there. However, Nancy meets with Chloe and invites her to come and live in Salem. Nancy and Chloe decide to hide the truth from Craig, who does not like the idea of adoption. Chloe feels rejected and runs away, Nancy tries to follow her but is knocked over by a truck. Chloe visits Nancy in hospital and decides to settle in Salem with her mother. Nancy finds it hard to adapt to motherhood and faces difficulties in concealing the truth from Craig. Nancy's father, Albert Miller arrives and makes the situation worse. Albert discovers the truth and attempts to get Chloe to move away with him. Nancy then tells Craig the truth, which causes problems in their relationship. Craig is later revealed as Chloe's biological father.

She was at Chloe's whenever she sick with leukemia and recovering from an accident that scarred her face for awhile. However, in 2022, Nancy discovered that Craig was having an affair, but with a man. He came out as gay and a devastated Nancy divorced him. She began dating Clyde Weston until she learned on their wedding day that he was responsible for Abigail Deveraux's death. She and Craig made peace with their relationship and allowed each other to find someone that loved them as much as they once did. She later runs into Mike Horton, and after making peace with him as well, they begin a relationship as of November 28, 2022, according to Jack Deveraux.

== Reception ==
For her portrayal of Nancy, Darbo was awarded "Outstanding female newcomer" at the 15th annual Soap Opera Digest Awards. In 2000, Darbo was nominated for the Daytime Emmy Award for Outstanding Supporting Actress in a Drama Series. In 2003, Alessandra Stanley of The New York Times said that daytime television had long been celebrating larger-size females. She added that the most notable was the "chubby temptress" Nancy. Seli Groves of The Beaver County Times said that she enjoyed the "marvellous machinations" that Nancy and Craig carried out. Darbo received positive fan mail due to her weight. Larger women and teenage girls praised her role because they would switch the television on and feel as though "there is a place for me". Darbo told The Record's Novakovich that she had never seen herself as a person "who was carrying a flag or banner, but the fan mail is incredible". Mark Edward Wilows from the Post-Tribune reported that critics were "raving" about Nancy as they believed her to be a "pivotal role" and a "genius stroke of casting". Wilows himself felt that Nancy was a "sultry, yet domineering high-society woman from hell". A columnist from TV Guide named her as the "big bad mama of daytime television". A columnist from the Orlando Sentinel said that "catty Nancy" was a "pure delight" to watch when she goads Marlena Evans (Deidre Hall). William White writing for Library Journal said that Nancy was a "full-figured and sensual" character.
