= Alexander W. Dreyfoos Jr. =

American businessman and philanthropist (1932–2023)

Alexander Wallace Dreyfoos Jr. (March 22, 1932 – May 28, 2023) was an American businessman and philanthropist based in West Palm Beach, Florida, and Saranac Lake, New York.

== Biography ==
Alexander Dreyfoos was the only son of cellist Martha Bullard Whittemore Dreyfoos (1898–1977) and photographer-inventor Alexander W. Dreyfoos Sr. (1876–1951) of Apeda Studios. He was of paternal Swiss-Jewish descent. He graduated from the Massachusetts Institute of Technology (MIT) in Cambridge, Massachusetts, in 1954 with a Bachelor of Science focusing on electronics, optics, and physics, assisted by MIT financing after the death of his father. Having also completed ROTC, Dreyfoos then served in the U.S. Air Force in Sembach, Germany, 1954–1956, commanding a 40-man photo lab critical to reconnaissance missions at age 22. Returning home, under the GI Bill he earned an MBA at Harvard Business School in 1958.[4] Dreyfoos earned his pilot's license in 1960, and multiple ratings over time including airline transport pilot (ATP). He had owned six airplanes, including two Citation jets, and two turbine helicopters, all of which he flew single-pilot.

Dreyfoos founded Photo Electronics Corporation (PEC) in 1963, with George W. Mergens, to address problems in color print reproduction. They developed their groundbreaking Video Color Negative Analyzer (VCNA) in Dreyfoos’ Port Chester, New York basement, then set up a factory in a former church in Connecticut. The VCNA was marketed worldwide by Eastman Kodak Company. Dreyfoos moved PEC to Florida in 1969, and in 1970 a motion-picture version of the VCNA earned an Academy Award from the Academy of Motion Picture Arts and Sciences. From 1990 to 2006, the VCNA was part of the “Information Age: People, Information and Technology” display at the American History Museum of the Smithsonian Institution and remains in its permanent collection. Dreyfoos later invented the innovative LaserColor Printer and assisted his son, Robert Dreyfoos, in developing a digital version of the VCNA for PEC called the Professional Video Analyzing Computer (PVAC).

Dreyfoos held ten U.S. and many foreign patents covering his inventions. Dreyfoos owned television station WPEC TV-12, the CBS affiliate in West Palm Beach, Florida, from 1973 to 1996. Beginning in 1977, under his direction, his staff developed the world-class Sailfish Marina Resort in Palm Beach Shores, Florida, which he sold in 2004. It was the success of PEC that enabled these purchases, and their subsequent sales that enabled Dreyfoos to practice philanthropy, for which he formed The Dreyfoos Group in 1996.

After founding in 1978 what became the Cultural Council of Palm Beach County, Dreyfoos led efforts that culminated in the 1992 opening of the fully funded Raymond F. Kravis Center for the Performing Arts, the cultural centerpiece of Palm Beach County. He remained its board chair until 2007 and remained a board member for life and its single largest donor at $7,000,000. As of June 30, 2016, the Kravis Center ranked in theatre venue ticket sales #11 in the world, #6 in the nation, and #1 in Florida.

To address his wife Renate's motion sickness, Dreyfoos helped to design their unique SWATH yacht Silver Cloud built by Abeking & Rasmussen in Lemwerder, Germany. When launched in 2008, Silver Cloud was the first pleasure yacht with the SWATH design, first used for commercial vessels. In 2015 Silver Cloud completed the circumnavigation of the world after Dreyfoos went to extreme measures to travel safely through terrorist-controlled waters. For part of the achievement, Dreyfoos received the World SuperYacht 2010 Voyager's Award.

Dreyfoos had been a photographer since childhood and was known for his travel and underwater photos. In 2015 he compiled 587 of his favorites in the book A Photographic Odyssey: Around the World with Alexander W. Dreyfoos (ed. Lise M. Steinhauer), with proceeds supporting the Cultural Council of Palm Beach County (ISBN 978-1-56352-110-2). In 2016 Dreyfoos commissioned his biography, Alexander W. Dreyfoos: Passion & Purpose by Lise M. Steinhauer and David Randal Allen, with proceeds to The Raymond F. Kravis Center for the Performing Arts, Inc. (ISBN 978-1-56352-9009).

Dreyfoos died on May 28, 2023, at the age of 91.

== Philanthropy ==
Dreyfoos made the largest donation in Florida history to a public school when he gave $1,000,000 in 1997 to Palm Beach County School of the Arts, renamed Alexander W. Dreyfoos School of the Arts. His support inspired other philanthropists to fund scholarships and enhancements to the high school. The Dreyfoos School of the Arts has been consistently well-viewed. Most recently (2016), U.S. News & World Report ranked it #10 in Florida public high schools and #66 nationally.

With his financial commitment at its launch in 1998, Dreyfoos became the first founding member of the marine conservation organization International SeaKeepers Society.

In 2004, Dreyfoos donated $1,000,000 to kick off support of Scripps Florida on the John D. MacArthur Campus of Florida Atlantic University in Jupiter, Florida. This biomedical research facility of the California-based Scripps Research Institute was joined by the Max Planck Florida Institute for Neuroscience, to which Alexander and Renate Dreyfoos also gave $1,000,000 in 2014. Dreyfoos was elected as a trustee to both The Scripps Research Institute and Max Planck Florida Institute.

Dreyfoos’ largest gift has been $15,000,000 to MIT for the Stata Center, which consists of two buildings, named for Dreyfoos and Bill Gates. Dreyfoos dedicated this gift to his late mentor and MIT physics professor, Arthur C. Hardy. Dreyfoos had also endowed an Alexander W. Dreyfoos Professorship at MIT's Media Lab since 1995. Dreyfoos’ relationship with MIT has been continuous. In 2013 the MIT Corporation named the auditorium atop its Media Lab Complex in Dreyfoos’ honor for years of service. He remained a Life Member Emeritus of The MIT Corporation.

One of Dreyfoos' donations to the Raymond F. Kravis Center for the Performing Arts was his funding of the George W. Mergens Memorial Organ, dedicated in 2016, a custom-made electronic virtual pipe organ with a massively parallel processing (MPP) digital computer.
