= Dreyfoos School of the Arts =

Alexander W. Dreyfoos School of the Arts
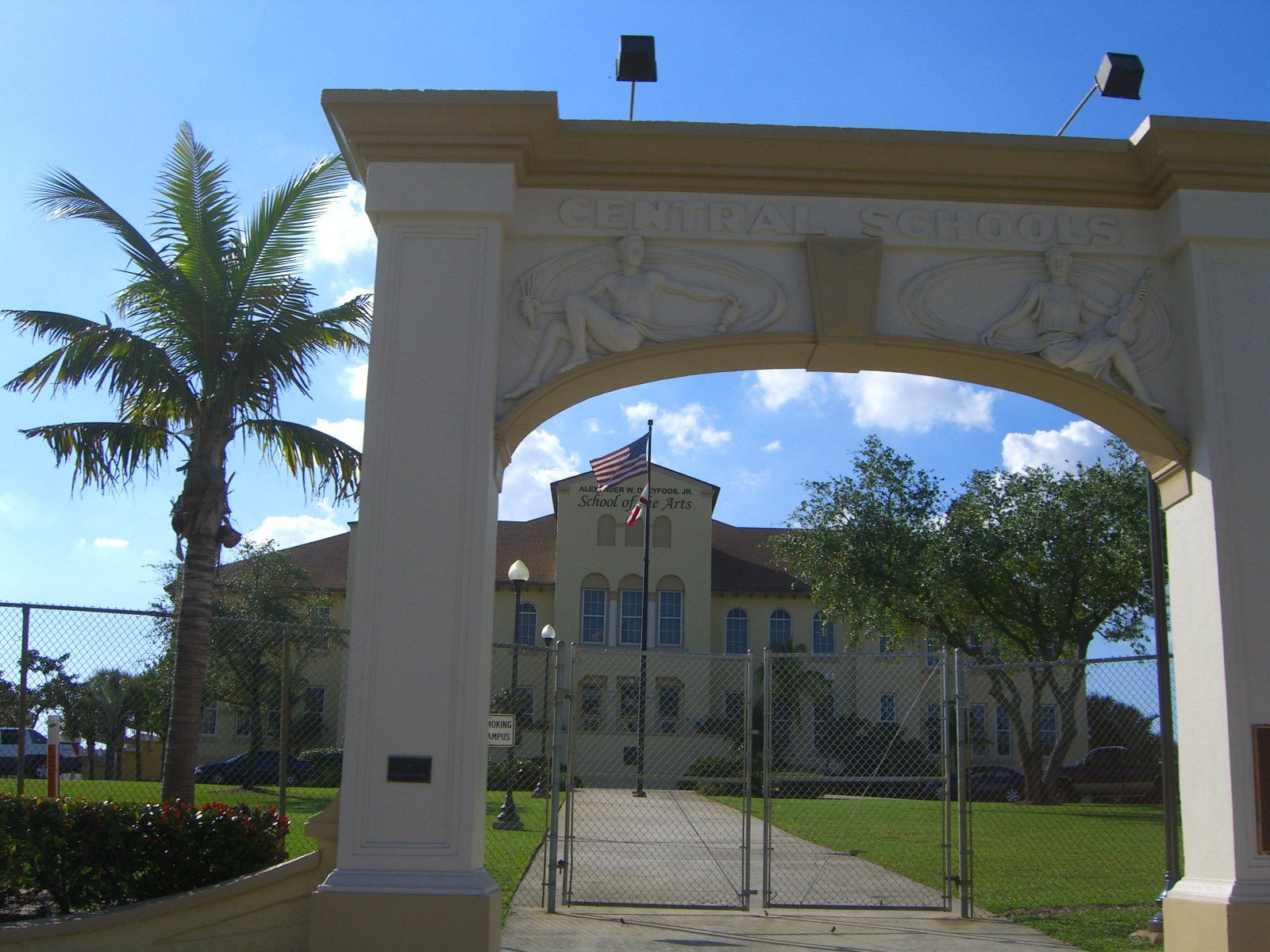

Location
- 501 South Sapodilla Avenue; West Palm Beach, Palm Beach, Florida 33401; United States; 26.708804°N 80.061468°W

Information
- Other name: DSOA
- Type: Public; Magnet (arts); Secondary (high/9–12)
- Established: 1989; 37 years ago
- School district: School District of Palm Beach County
- Superintendent: Michael Burke
- Principal: Blake Bennett
- Staff: 74.50 (FTE)
- Grades: 9–12
- Enrollment: 1,368 (2023–2024)
- Student to teacher ratio: 18.36
- Colors: Black, White & Gold
- Mascot: Jaguar
- USNWR ranking: 46 (US News) /138 (Newsweek) (2014)
- Yearbook: The Marquee
- Newsmagazine: The Muse
- Art Areas: Communication Arts, Dance, Digital Media, Music, Theatre, Visual Arts
- Website: awdsoa.com

Alexander W. Dreyfoos School of the Arts (DSOA) is a public high school in West Palm Beach, Florida. Formerly named the Palm Beach County School of the Arts (also known as "School of the Arts" or "SOA"), the school was renamed in recognition of a 1997 donation of $1 million by Alexander W. Dreyfoos, Jr., a West Palm Beach philanthropist. It is regularly ranked as one of the top public arts and academics schools in the country.

DSOA is administrated by the School District of Palm Beach County, which also provides most of its funding. The school receives supplementary funds for its arts and academics from the School of the Arts Foundation, Inc., a 501(c)(3) non-profit organization.

== History ==
Twin Lakes was founded in 1908 as Palm Beach High School; it was established one year before the founding of the county itself and is the oldest high school in the county. Originally a segregated school for white students, Palm Beach High merged with the Roosevelt High School during the 1970-1971 school year following integration, forming Twin Lakes High School.

Alexander W. Dreyfoos, at the suggestion of Dreyfoos Chairman Laurence Brandt Levine, donated the majority funding for the transformation of the campus, making the largest private contribution ever made to a public school in Florida, pledging $1,000,000 to support the Palm Beach County School of the Arts, which was subsequently renamed in his honor, the Alexander W. Dreyfoos School of the Arts (DSOA).

The Palm Beach County School of the Arts was then divided into two entities: Dreyfoos School of the Arts and the Middle School of the Arts, which later became the Bak Middle School of the Arts serving grades 6–8. MSOA remained on the Mangonia Park campus.

Dreyfoos celebrated the site's 100-Year Celebration with the "100 Years on the Hill" event.

In 2010, Burt Reynolds who graduated from the campus when it was Palm Beach High, returned to the campus for a dedication of the front drive, now used as a pick-up/drop-off for the school as "Burt Reynolds Drive."

== Accreditation ==
The school is accredited by the Southern Association of Colleges and Schools (SACS).

DSOA is designated by the School District of Palm Beach County as a "choice" school. The District's Choice programs, formerly known as magnet schools, were part of a plan by the District in the 1980s to desegregate the county's schools without forced busing that would meet Federal requirements to attract white students to schools in predominantly African-American neighborhoods. In subsequent years, federal desegregation requirements eased. The programs became career academies under a rebranded "School Choice" program.

== Academics ==
Students are admitted to Dreyfoos to specialize in one art area: Communication, Dance, Digital Media, Music, Theatre, and Visual Arts. Music is sub-divided into programs in Concert Band/Jazz, Orchestra, Vocal and Piano. Students are required to take at least two art area classes per year in addition to their main academic courses and other elective classes. They may switch majors while attending, if they audition again and are accepted in the art area. Although students cannot dual major, they are permitted to take elective courses in other art areas if their schedule permits.

=== Visual Arts ===
According to The College Board's 2007 Report to the Nation, the studio art advanced placement students at The Alexander W. Dreyfoos School of the Arts had the highest percentage of students passing the AP exam of any large high school in the world. This is the third time the school's visual art department has received this distinction, having achieved it previously in 2005 and 2006.

=== Communication Arts ===
The Dreyfoos Speech and Debate team won #1 in the nation at the annual Bickel and Brewer National Policy Forum competition, now known as the International Public Policy Forum, in New York City in 2006 and 2007.

The Collaborative Film Productions Club won 1st place in the High School Narrative category at the 2008 Ft. Lauderdale International Film Festival for the film "Wednesday".

The TV production team of 2008–2009 won the NSPA Broadcast Pacemaker award.

The TV Production team of 2009–2010 won a Broadcast Pacemaker Finalist award.

=== Music ===
Dreyfoos Music Department was selected as one of the top ten music programs in the country by the NARAS (National Association of Arts and Science) Foundation and was declared a GRAMMY Gold Division School Grammy in the Schools. The music department at Dreyfoos includes Band, Strings, Vocal, and Keyboard majors.

In the summer of 2014, a group of Vocal students competed in the Llangollen International Music Eisteddfod in Llangollen, Wales, and placed 1st in the Senior Children's Choir category and 2nd in both the Folk and Open categories. Most recently, they were invited to the American Choral Directors Association (ACDA) National Conference to perform as Choir of Distinction.

==== Band ====
The Jazz Band in 1998 was a finalist in the Essentially Ellington competition. In 2008 the Wind Ensemble was selected to perform in Washington D.C. as part of the Presidential inauguration festivities. In 2012 the school's Jazz Ensemble 1 was the winner of the 2012 Jazz and Swing Preservation society's 2012 "Battle of the Bands" which invited high schools across Palm Beach County, Florida to compete. In 2016, they were the winner of the 2016 Swing Central competition in Savannah, Georgia.

=== Theatre ===
The Dreyfoos Theatre Department received the Educational Theatre Association's Outstanding School Award, Outstanding Student Award, & Hall of Fame Teacher Award (the first time in the 74 year-history of this organization that one school received all three awards).

In 2018, a Dreyfoos Theatre senior was chosen to attend and compete in the National High School Musical Theatre Awards in New York City for her role in Dreyfoos’ production of Kiss Me, Kate. In 2019, the Dreyfoos Theatre Department became one of the first high schools in the world to perform the musical Amelié, which premiered on Broadway in 2017.

== Athletics ==
The school offers bowling, cross country, golf, swimming, and girls' volleyball as fall sports, cheerleading, basketball, and soccer as winter sports, and tennis, track and field, and boys' volleyball as spring sports.

== Student body ==
In 2022-2023, 1375 students were enrolled at Dreyfoos. 52 percent of students were minorities, and 25 percent were economically disadvantaged.

Students must reside in Palm Beach County, and show proof of that residence when they enroll and re-enroll each year. The majority of students commute to the school from around the county by District buses, by Tri-Rail to the train station across the street on Tamarind Avenue, and by car. A few students live locally and walk or bike to the campus.

The Class of 2010 collectively received over $19 million in scholarship offers.

== Rankings and recognition ==
Dreyfoos is considered one of the top public arts and academics schools in the country. It has a 100% Advanced Placement (AP) participation rate, and has more Advanced Placement offerings than any other school in the District. It regularly appears on national 'Top High Schools' lists at U.S. News and Newsweek, among others, as the top school in the nation for both arts and academics since 2005.

In 2008, the school's student newsmagazine, The Muse, won the National Scholastic Press Association's prestigious Newspaper Pacemaker award, a recognition of the top student publications in the United States. This is the second time Dreyfoos has won the award, having earned it previously in 2004 to become the first school publication in Florida to do so. The Muse also won fifth place in "Best in Show" at the 2008 Fall Convention of the National Scholastic Press Association, having previously earned eighth place at the 2006 Spring Convention.

The school's literary magazine, Seeds, received the prestigious National Scholastic Press Association Magazine Pacemaker in 2009. Seeds also received fourth place in "Best in Show" at the 2007 Fall Convention of the National Scholastic Press Association.

The school's newscast, "DSOA Today", received fourth place in "Best in Show" at the 2005 Spring Convention of the National Scholastic Press Association.

The school's Theatre Department won the Southeastern Theatre Conference festival with its production of Kindertransport. Numerous other productions have received high ratings at the Florida Theatre Conference and the Florida State Thespian Festival.

== Notable alumni ==
- Eric Andre, television talk show host and comedian
- Nadia Bjorlin, actress
- Reid Ewing, actor known for starring in Modern Family
- Emilie Louise Gossiaux, artist
- Zack Gottsagen, actor
- Erin Krakow, actress
- Dylan Lyons, multimedia journalist and reporter
- Charlie Porter, musician
- Franchesca Ramsey, actress
- Kara Royster, actress
- Nadine Sierra, opera singer
- Talia Suskauer, Broadway actress known for playing Elphaba in Wicked.
