= Redline (2007 film) =

2007 film directed by Andy Cheng

- Theatrical release poster
- Directed by: Andy Cheng
- Screenplay by: Robert Foreman
- Story by: Daniel Sadek
- Produced by: Daniel Sadek
- Starring: Nathan Phillips; Nadia Bjorlin; Angus Macfadyen; Tim Matheson; Eddie Griffin
- Cinematography: Bill Butler
- Edited by: Dallas Puett
- Music by: Ian Honeyman; Andrew Raiher
- Distributed by: Chicago Pictures
- Release date: April 13, 2007
- Running time: 95 minutes
- Country: United States
- Language: English
- Budget: $26 million
- Box office: $8.3 million

Redline is a 2007 American independent racing action-thriller film.

The film's plot is centered on a street racing circle funded by a group of multimillionaires who wager millions of dollars over their high-powered sports cars. It was written and produced by Daniel Sadek, who also used his own automobile collection in the film.

The film title was borrowed from the original working title of the 2001 film, The Fast and the Furious.

Redline was released in North America on April 13, 2007. A critical and financial failure at the box office, the film is most notable for being funded by subprime loans issued by Sadek's company, Quick Loan Funding, which closed its doors in the wake of the subprime mortgage crisis. It was featured on the CNBC special House of Cards as an example of the excess of the pre-meltdown mortgage market in the United States.

== Plot ==
Natasha Martin is an auto mechanic and aspiring musician who is invited to join music producer Infamous aboard his private jet en route to Las Vegas in appreciation of her services on his Ford GT. She is also a highly skilled race car driver, but is haunted by memories of her father's death at a NASCAR race many years ago. Meanwhile, on another side of town, USAF veteran Carlo, returning from a tour of duty in Iraq, meets up with his brother Jason before heading to Vegas themselves. Carlo is not happy that Jason is living with their mob boss uncle Michael D'Orazio, whom he blames for their family's destruction. They are unaware that Michael has been running an unsuccessful counterfeiting ring and owes millions of dollars to another syndicate led by the "Godfather".

On the outskirts of Vegas, a high-stakes race event is being held, with Michael, Infamous, Hollywood producer Jerry Brecken and Chinese businessman Marcus Cheng placing their bets over who has the better car. When Infamous' driver fakes an ankle injury, Natasha becomes Infamous' driver in exchange for $300,000 and a recording contract. However, she is unaware that Infamous has to place her on his wager, as Michael - who has been obsessed with her since watching her band perform on stage earlier - has placed four platinum bars at stake. At the same time, Brecken wagers his brand-new Enzo on Natasha.

Natasha (driving a Mercedes-Benz SLR McLaren) takes on Jason (driving a Lamborghini Diablo). As they approach the finish line, Natasha is several car lengths ahead of Jason, but he quickly zips past her by engaging the onboard nitrous system. However, because of the excessive speed, the Diablo loses downforce, flies off the ground and flips in mid-air before crashing upside down at the finish line. Attempting to avoid the falling Diablo, Natasha crashes on a barrier and is knocked unconscious. Before Carlo can reach Jason to rescue him, the Diablo bursts into flames, killing his brother instantly. Michael's henchmen, dressed as paramedics, place Natasha in an ambulance and speed off.

Natasha wakes up in Michael's mansion, realizing that she is now his property. Meanwhile, Carlo meets up with an old military friend and picks up some ammunition and gear before riding a Ducati 999, to Michael's mansion, intending to kill him. Instead, he rescues Natasha and evades Michael's guards. Michael and Natasha hide out in a motel, where Nat calls her mother, to assure her that she is safe. Natasha finds Carlo in a bar sulking, and both bond due to their similar losses of close relatives. They share a gentle dance together before presumably having sex in their motel room. Meanwhile, Michael has his guards kidnap Natasha's mother to blackmail her into driving for him at the next race at Red Rock Canyon in Nevada. After receiving an ultimatum by the Godfather to pay him $80 million following a botched attempt at giving him counterfeit bills, Michael raises his funds for the upcoming race by borrowing money from the banks using his mansion as collateral.

In the final race, Michael, Brecken, Infamous and Cheng place their bets for a combined purse of $100 million. Infamous and Cheng are eliminated from the race after their cars (an SLR and a Porsche Carrera GT, respectively) are involved in separate crashes. During the race, Natasha (driving Michael's Enzo) receives a phone call from Carlo notifying her that he has rescued her mother. While she is several car lengths ahead of Brecken's Saleen S7 Twin Turbo, she stops the Enzo an inch away from the finish line and gives the S7 the win, costing Michael the race.

With no money left, Michael is given a last ride from the Godfather's henchmen. To repay Natasha for handing his driver the victory, Brecken gives her a recording contract (which shortly gives her a gold record and lands her on the cover of Variety), an Enzo and a Koenigsegg CCX. The film ends with Natasha (in the Koenigsegg) and Carlo (in the Enzo), now in a relationship, racing each other before being chased by the police on the freeway.

== Cast ==
- Nathan Phillips as Carlo
- Nadia Bjorlin as Natasha Martin
- Jesse Johnson as Jason
- Angus Macfadyen as Michael D'Orazio
- Tim Matheson as Jerry Brecken
- Eddie Griffin as "Infamous"
- Denyce Lawton as Mianda
- Kevin Levrone as Sante
- Barbara Niven as Sally Martin
- David Dayan Fisher as "The Godfather"
- Hal Ozsan as Mike "Mike Z"
- Todd Lowe as Nick
- Neill Skylar as Mary
- Marc Crumpton as Trevor
- Faleolo Alailima as Diggs
- Michael Hagiwara as Marcus Cheng
- Christopher Backus as Tony Nefuse
- Mary Elise Hayden as Liz Athens
- Amber Lancaster as Angela
- Ernie Reyes Jr. as Ernie
- Joe Sagal as The Elvis Announcer

Daniel Sadek, the film's producer, makes a cameo appearance as a poker player, alongside professional players Gus Hansen and David Williams.

== Background ==
Daniel Sadek, a third-grade dropout from Lebanon, migrated to the United States, where he worked at gas stations and car dealerships. After seeing many mortgage brokers buy cars from the Mercedes-Benz dealership he worked at, Sadek entered the real estate business and set up the subprime lending firm Quick Loan Funding in 2002. By 2007, Quick Loan Funding had approved US$4 billion in subprime mortgages, with Sadek's take-home earnings reaching US$5 million a month. He used his earnings to buy several homes in Southern California and Las Vegas, build his collection of expensive supercars and feed his insatiable appetite for gambling.

During this time, Sadek was engaged to soap opera actress Nadia Bjorlin. Using his subprime lending firm as his source of funding, he produced the film Redline to show off his car collection and help Bjorlin break out of the soap opera scene.

== Enzo crash incident ==
In March 2007, Eddie Griffin participated in a charity race at Irwindale Speedway to promote the film, using an Enzo owned by Sadek. During a practice run, Griffin lost control of the Enzo and crashed into a concrete barrier. He walked away unharmed, but the US$1.5 million supercar was badly damaged. Griffin went on to lash out at reporters who claimed the crash was a publicity stunt.

== Box office ==
The film opened at #11 at the U.S. box office, grossing US$3.9 million in 1,607 theaters in its opening weekend. The budget of the film was US$26 million and after six weeks in theaters, the film grossed US$6.8 million in North America. Furthermore, Cartoon Network sued Sadek for failing to pay the US$845,000 advertising fee.

== Reception ==
The film was not screened for critics before it opened, but critical reviews after its premiere were unanimously negative. On the review aggregator website Rotten Tomatoes, 0% of 26 critics' reviews are positive, with an average rating of 2.2/10. The website's consensus reads: "Redline has plenty of bad acting, laughable dialogue, and luxury cars." Metacritic, which uses a weighted average, assigned the film a score of 24 out of 100, based on 12 critics, indicating "generally unfavorable" reviews.

Jalopnik ranked the film number one on their list of The 12 Worst Car Movies of All Time.

== Home media ==
Redline was released on DVD by The Weinstein Company on August 21, 2007. Christopher Monfette of IGN gave the DVD an overall rating of 5 out of 10, citing that it gives "more of the same; none of the new." The film has also been released on Blu-ray outside the U.S.

== Legacy ==
In the CNBC special House of Cards, the crashing of two US$500,000 cars for a single scene is cited as a direct example of the excess of the pre-crash subprime loan market in the mid-2000s. Quick Loan Funding had long since crumbled following the film's release, and the expected profits from the film were heavily borrowed against. The film's failure further worsened the situation. Following the demise of his company, Sadek lost his escrow and lending licenses over issues of him withdrawing millions from his corporate accounts to gamble in Vegas. Aside from over a dozen cases revolving Quick Loan Funding, he was sued by Bellagio and Wells Fargo over unpaid debts and repeated cash advances done at gambling resorts worldwide. He declared bankruptcy in 2009.

Vanity Fair listed Sadek at number 86 in their "100 to Blame" for the economic crisis, dubbing him "Predator Zero in the subprime-mortgage game."

== See also ==
- List of films with a 0% rating on Rotten Tomatoes
