= Palm Beach County School of the Arts =

The Palm Beach County School of the Arts was the original performing, fine arts and communications magnet school for Palm Beach County, Florida. Founded in 1989 as a middle/high school it grew class year by class year into that mission. In 1998 the school was split into a high school, the Dreyfoos School of the Arts on another campus, and the Middle School of the Arts, which later became the Bak Middle School of the Arts on the existing campus.

== History ==
In 1989, the School District of Palm Beach County, Florida, facing mandatory desegregation of its schools implemented a magnet school program instead, to voluntarily attract white students to predominantly African-American neighborhood schools. North Shore High School in West Palm Beach was converted into the Palm Beach County School of the Arts in 1990. The Palm Beach County School of the Arts opened as a middle school with 250 students, grades 7-9, enrolled. The school focused on five arts areas: Communication arts, dance, music, theatre, and visual arts. The school was expanded by adding a new 7th grade class. In 1994 the school was a middle and high school with students from grades 7 through 12. The need to separate the schools into proper middle and high schools was facilitated by Alexander W. Dreyfoos, Jr., a wealthy patron who made a pledge of $1,000,000 in support to build a new high school of the performing arts on the closed campus of Twin Lakes High School in 1997. In 1998, the high school was moved to the new campus, and the existing facility was renamed the Middle School of the Arts.

In 2002, the school was renamed the Bak Middle School of the Arts. Mrs. Dora Bak of Palm Beach donated $1.5 million bequest to the school to honor her late husband, Dr. Richard Bak, who was an economist and statistician, specializing in international markets, finance and economics.
