= Apeda Studio =

Photographic studio in New York City

Apeda logo

Apeda Studio was a photography business in New York City. It was established as a partnership between Alexander W. Dreyfoos Sr. It incorporated in 1914.

In 1913 the studio was sued unsuccessfully for copyright infringement, for reproducing the work of another studio, marking it as its own work, and selling it.

The International Center of Photography (ICP) and Library of Congress have collections of photographs from the studio.
