= Patrika Darbo =

American actress

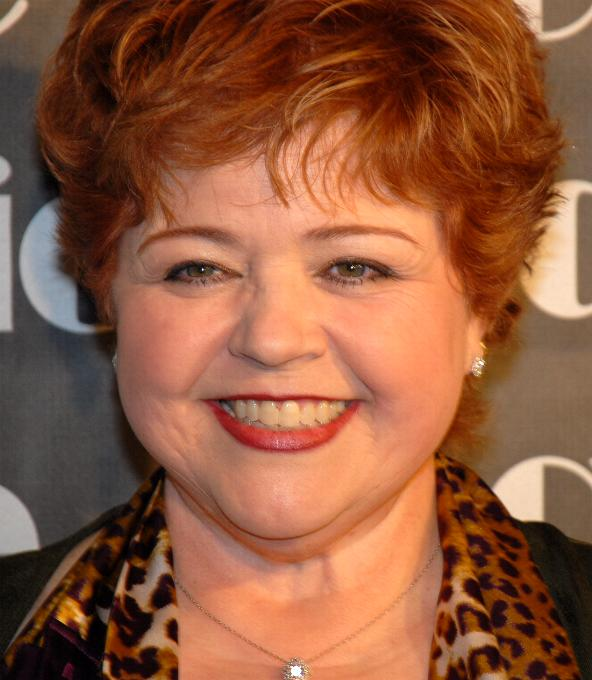
- Darbo in 2008
- Born: Jacksonville, Florida, U.S.
- Education: Georgia Southern University
- Occupation: Actress
- Years active: 1983–present
- Spouse: Rolf Darbo (m. 1973)

Patrika Darbo is an American actress. She made her big screen debut appearing in the 1988 romantic comedy film It Takes Two and later appeared in The 'Burbs (1989), Daddy's Dyin': Who's Got the Will? (1990), Spaced Invaders (1990), Leaving Normal (1992), In the Line of Fire (1993) and Midnight in the Garden of Good and Evil (1997). Darbo played Roseanne Barr in the 1994 biographical television film Roseanne & Tom: Behind the Scenes.

Darbo is known for her roles as Nancy Wesley and Shirley Spectra in the television soap operas Days of Our Lives and The Bold and the Beautiful, respectively. In 2016, Darbo won a Primetime Emmy Award for Outstanding Actress in a Short Form Comedy or Drama Series for her role in the online comedy series Acting Dead, becoming the first winner in that category.

== Early life and education ==
Darbo was born in Jacksonville, Florida, the daughter of Patricia, a restaurant hostess, and "Chubby," a nightclub manager. At age six her parents divorced; her mother then married Donald Davidson when Darbo was 11. She grew up in Atlanta, Georgia. She studied theater at Georgia Southern University in Statesboro, Georgia, graduating in 1970, and later attended the Atlanta School of Drama. She worked as a credit manager until 1984, when she began a professional acting career.

== Career ==
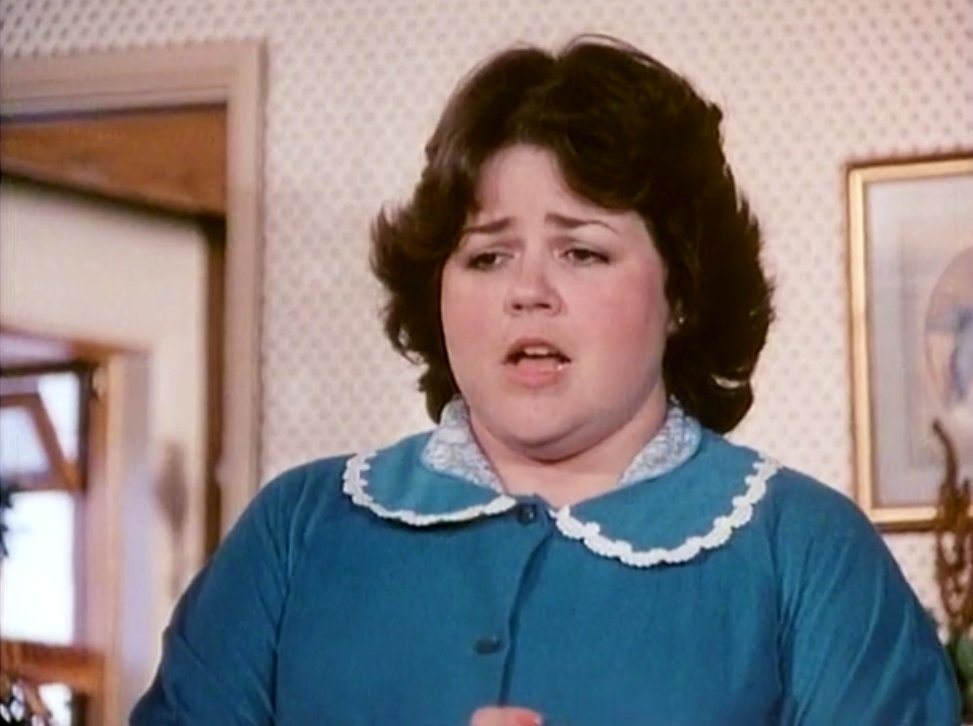
Darbo in a 1983 episode of The Optimist

Darbo began her career with guest-starring roles in the television shows including The Optimist, Bay City Blues, Riptide, Diff'rent Strokes, Growing Pains, St. Elsewhere, Punky Brewster and Mama's Family. She made her big screen debut, appearing in the comedy film The Night Before and the romantic comedy It Takes Two. The following year, Darbo appeared in the comedy films Troop Beverly Hills and The 'Burbs. In 1990, she appeared in a five feature films and guest-starred on Roseanne as a Roseanne lookalike/Dan's crush. By 1991, Darbo was contracted to the ABC network. In 1991, the Los Angeles Times reported that Darbo was undertaking a personal campaign to seek nomination for an Academy Award for Best Supporting Actress for her role in the comedy-drama film Daddy's Dyin': Who's Got the Will?, written by Del Shores.

From 1991 to 1992, Darbo was a regular cast member in the ABC sitcom Step by Step playing the role of Penny Baker, the sister of Suzanne Somers. In 1992, she appeared in the comedy-drama film Leaving Normal playing the character named 66. Later that year she appeared in the horror-comedy The Vagrant directed by Chris Walas. In 1993, she played Pam Magnus, a banking employee killed by John Malkovich's character in the Clint Eastwood action thriller film In the Line of Fire. In 1994, she had a supporting role in the comedy-drama film Corrina, Corrina. On television, Darbo guest-starred on Seinfeld (Darbo was a guest star in two episodes; "The Revenge" (1991) and "The Sniffing Accountant" (1993)), Lois & Clark: The New Adventures of Superman and Married... with Children. In 1994, Darbo starred as Roseanne Barr in an NBC biographical television film, Roseanne and Tom: Behind the Scenes. After her first leading role, Darbo returned to playing supporting parts on both film and television. In 1997, she appeared in the action film Speed 2: Cruise Control and the mystery thriller film Midnight in the Garden of Good and Evil working again with Clint Eastwood. In 1998, she starred as Miss Spencer in the biographical television film Ruby Bridges.

In 1998, Darbo was cast as Nancy Wesley on the NBC daytime soap opera, Days of Our Lives. In May 1998. The serial's casting director, Fran Bascom told Carol Bidwell of Los Angeles Daily News that their producer, Tom Langan wanted "a real woman, not one of these super-skinny actresses" to join the cast. Bascom said that she immediately thought of accredited actress Darbo. Langan approved Darbo's hiring and decided that she did not need to audition for the role. In 1999, Darbo received Soap Opera Digest Award for Outstanding Female Newcomer. In 2000, she received Daytime Emmy Award nomination for Outstanding Supporting Actress in a Drama Series. She left the series in 2005. Darbo returned to the role in 2013, 2016, 2017 and as of 2022 appears on the recurring basic.

Darbo appeared in the horror films Madhouse (2004) and Hatchet (2006). She played Mrs. Claus in the Christmas adventure film The Search for Santa Paws (2010). Later, in 2010, she also guest starred in Showtime's Dexter. In 2009 and 2012, Darbo guest-starred on Desperate Housewives. Between 2010 and 2012, she portrayed the recurring role of Dr Freed in the teen drama web series Miss Behave. She also guest-starred on The Middle, Devious Maids, The Big Bang Theory and 9-1-1: Lone Star. In 2012, Darbo played Grams in the adventure-comedy film, Mickey Matson and the Copperhead Conspiracy.

In 2016, Darbo won a Primetime Emmy Award for Outstanding Actress in a Short Form Comedy or Drama Series for her work in the series Acting Dead. She is the first winner of this category. From February 2017 to March 2018, Darbo starred as Shirley Spectra, the sister of Sally Spectra (Darlene Conley) on the CBS soap opera, The Bold and the Beautiful. She briefly returned in November 2018.

In 2017, Darbo appeared in the comedy-drama film, The Hero. In 2018, Darbo played Rosie in the Christian drama film God Bless The Broken Road. In 2023, she appeared in the Christmas comedy film Ladies of the '80s: A Divas Christmas. In 2024, Patrika Darbo has announced that she would be returning to Days Of Our Lives to reprise her role of Nancy Miller.

== Personal life ==
Darbo married director Rolf Peter Darbo in 1973.

== Filmography ==
=== Film ===
Year	Title	Role	Notes
1988	The Night Before	Bimbo	
1988	It Takes Two	Dee Dee	
1989	Troop Beverly Hills	Marvista	
1989	The 'Burbs	Suzette Weingartner	
1990	Daddy's Dyin': Who's Got the Will?	Marlene Turnover	
1990	Spaced Invaders	Mrs Vanderspool	
1990	Gremlins 2: The New Batch	Yogurt Customer	
1990	Ghost Dad	Nurse	
1990	The Willies	Mrs. Walters	
1991	Dutch	Greasy Spoon Waitress	
1992	Leaving Normal	66	
1992	The Vagrant	Doattie	
1993	In the Line of Fire	Pam Magnus	
1994	Corrina, Corrina	Wilma	
1995	Babe	Sheep	Voice
1996	Fast Money	Teebou	
1996	House Arrest	Cafeteria Cashier	
1997	Speed 2: Cruise Control	Ruby Fisher	
1997	Midnight in the Garden of Good and Evil	Sara Warren	
1999	Durango Kids	Mrs. Grey	
2004	Madhouse	Betty	
2005	Mr. & Mrs. Smith	50's Woman	
2005	Carpool Guy	Patty	
2006	Hatchet	Shannon Permatteo	
2007	Moving McAllister	Debbie	
2007	Charlie Wilson's War	Auctioneer	
2010	The Search for Santa Paws	Mrs. Claus	
2011	Rango	Delilah and Maybelle	Voices
2011	Life at the Resort	Penny	
2012	Mickey Matson and the Copperhead Conspiracy	Grams	
2014	My Trip Back to the Dark Side	Nosey Nelly	
2014	Pirate's Code: The Adventures of Mickey Matson	Grams	
2016	The Remake	Eileen OConnor	
2016	Boonville Redemption	Thelma	
2017	The Hero	Diane	
2018	Spinning Man	Kelly	
2018	God Bless the Broken Road	Rosie	
2019	Emmett	Dot	
2022	Kimi	Southern Woman	Voice
2023	Loulou	Sister Beatrice	Also producer

=== Television ===
Year	Title	Role	Notes
1983	The Optimist	The Mother	Episode: "Kid's Stuff"
1983	Bay City Blues	Cheryl Sanders	Episode: "Zircons Are Forever"
1984	Riptide	Mildred Stubowitz	Episode: “Pilot”
1985	Diff'rent Strokes	Mother	Episode: “Arnold Saves the Squirrel”
1987-1990	Growing Pains	Various Characters	5 episodes
1988	St. Elsewhere	Kathy Goderegius	Episode: “Final Cut”
1988	Punky Brewster	Nancy	Episode: “Wimped Out”
1989	Mama's Family	Florence	Episode: “Reading The Riot Act”
1990	Roseanne	Marge Dolman	Episode: "Dream Lover"
1991	Seinfeld	Glenda	Episode: "The Revenge"
1991–1992	Step by Step	Penny Baker	22 episodes
1993	Lois & Clark: The New Adventures of Superman	Helene Morris	Episode: "I'm Looking Through You"
1993	Married... with Children	Ethel	Episode: "Take My Wife, Please"
1994	Roseanne and Tom: Behind the Scenes	Roseanne Arnold	Television film
1998	Ruby Bridges	Miss Spencer	Television movie
1998–2005; 2013, 2016–2017; 2022–2024	Days of Our Lives	Nancy Wesley	458 episodes
2002	Gilmore Girls	Waitress	1 episode
2005	Rodney	Irene	Episode: "Charity Ball"
2009, 2012	Desperate Housewives	Jean	Episodes: "Mama Spent the Money When She Had None" and "Finishing the Hat"
2010–2012	Miss Behave	Dr Freed	5 episodes
2011	The Middle	Ms. Jacobs	Episode: "Back to Summer"
2015	The Big Bang Theory	Grace	Episode: "The Perspiration Implementation"
2016	Lab Rats: Elite Force	Mrs. Ramsey	Episode: "Power Play"
2017–2018	The Bold and the Beautiful	Shirley Spectra	74 episodes
2019–2020	Days of our Lives' Last Blast Reunion	Nancy Wesley	3 episodes Television miniseries
2020	9-1-1: Lone Star	Ellen	Episode: "Yee-Haw"
2021	The Young and the Restless	Shirley Spectra	5 episodes (April 6, 2021; May 14, 2021; May 26, 2021; May 31, 2021; June 4, 2021)
2023	Ladies of the '80s: A Divas Christmas	Julie	Television film

== Awards and nominations ==
Year	Award	Work	Result	Ref
1999	Soap Opera Digest Award for Outstanding Female Newcomer	Days of Our Lives	Won	
2000	Daytime Emmy Award for Outstanding Supporting Actress in a Drama Series	Days of Our Lives	Nominated	
2016	Primetime Emmy Award for Outstanding Actress in a Short Form Comedy or Drama Series	Acting Dead	Won	
2020	Daytime Emmy Award for Outstanding Performance by a Supporting Actress in a Digital Drama Series	Studio City	Nominated	
