= Nadia Bjorlin =

American actress, singer, and model

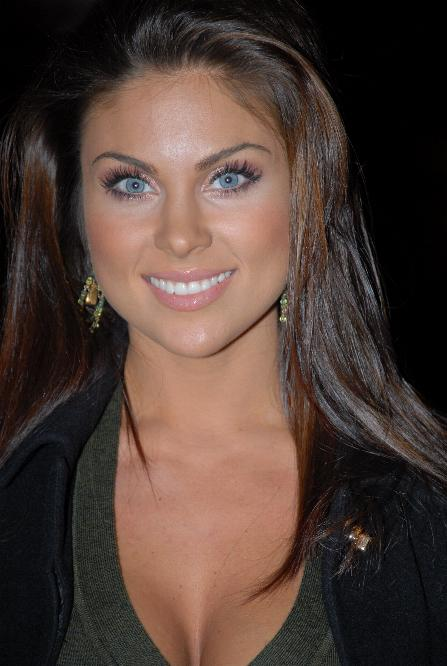
- Bjorlin in 2007
- Born: August 2, 1980 (age 46); Newport, Rhode Island, U.S.
- Occupations: Actress; model; singer
- Years active: 1999–present
- Spouse: Grant Turnbull (m. 2015)
- Children: 2
- Website: Official website

Nadia Bjorlin (born August 2, 1980) is an American actress, model and singer.

== Early life ==
Bjorlin was born on August 2, 1980, in Newport, Rhode Island. She is the second eldest child of Swedish composer and conductor Ulf Björlin and Fary Björlin (née Dadashi), an Iranian interior designer.

Bjorlin is fluent in English, Swedish, and Persian and is also schooled in French, Italian, and Russian.

Bjorlin's family moved to her father's native country of Sweden while she was still an infant. She has described her childhood as "wonderful" with "loving parents and siblings to lean on", although Bjorlin recalls being "oblivious" to racial tensions going on in Sweden. Although she never attended school there, a few of her siblings did and she remembers them talking about how they "experienced some torment" from classmates due to being half-Iranian. Being born after the Revolution of Iran, Bjorlin says she "grew up in a time where Iranians were looked down upon in places of the world".

Bjorlin's family moved back and forth between the States and Sweden before she was seven years old. They moved a few times because of her father's work, living in Stockholm, Los Angeles and Palm Beach Florida. For her education, she attended the Interlochen Center for the Arts and the Boston University Tanglewood Institute, where she was honored for her excellence in theatre, voice, music and dance. Along with her brothers Ulf and Jean Paul, Bjorlin attended the Palm Beach County School of the Arts (now Dreyfoos School of the Arts) for her first 2 years of high school. During her time there, Bjorlin sang with the Palm Beach Opera and in 1996, she competed in a large international vocal competition in Verona, Italy, where she was part of the choir who won the gold medal. While she was a junior in high school her family moved, this time to New York City. Bjorlin was able to attend the Professional Children's School, where she studied alongside other famous actors and actresses, including Julia Stiles, Gaby Hoffmann, and Macaulay Culkin. In May 1999, Bjorlin won first place in the Metro Lyric Opera Competition, taking place in NYC. When she graduated from high school, she decided to shift her focus from singing to acting.

== Career ==
Bjorlin's first major role was in April 1999 as Chloe Lane on the soap opera Days of Our Lives. In late 1999, she appeared as a go-go dancer in the music video for Ricky Martin's song Shake Your Bon-Bon.

Bjorlin left Days in June 2003 to concentrate on her singing career but returned later in December 2003. In September 2005, Bjorlin left Days of our Lives again and joined the cast of the UPN series Sex, Love & Secrets. The show was canceled by the network, but Bjorlin continued to make guest appearances on television series such as Jake in Progress and Out of Practice.

Bjorlin appeared in the 2007 independent feature film If I Had Known I Was a Genius, starring Markus Redmond, Whoopi Goldberg, Sharon Stone, and Tara Reid. The film was screened at the 2007 Sundance Film Festival.

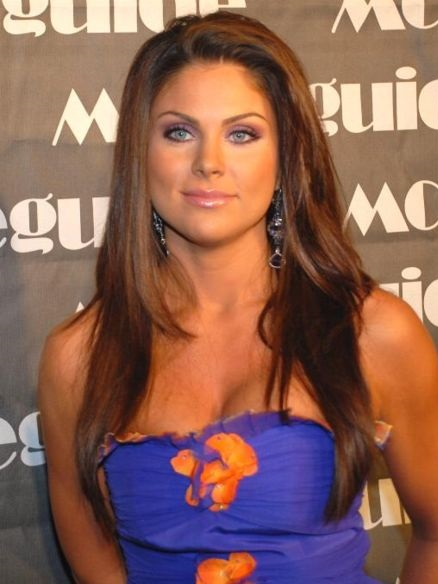
Bjorlin in 2008

Bjorlin was also cast as the female lead of the Chicago Pictures' feature film, Redline. Produced by her then fiancé, Daniel Sadek, who used his soon to fail subprime lending firm as his source of funding, the intent was to help Bjorlin break out of the soap opera scene. Released in April 2007, review aggregator website Rotten Tomatoes shows the film with a rare approval rating of 0% – meaning no favorable reviews whatsoever. Bjorlin returned to Days of Our Lives in November 2007.

Since 2009, Bjorlin has starred as lesbian author Lara Miller in the web series Venice: The Series.

In 2010, Bjorlin had a small role in NCIS as a suburban housewife wearing a bikini during a door-to-door canvassing by one of the NCIS investigators. That same year she guest starred on the CBS sitcom Two and a Half Men as Evelyn Harper's (Holland Taylor) lesbian lover, Jill.

In 2011, Bjorlin was one of the stars of the reality television series Dirty Soap which gave viewers a behind-the-scenes view of Nadia's departure from Days of Our Lives, and afterward, including a bit of insight into the tenuous relationship between Nadia's live-in boyfriend and her mother who doesn't like him because she believes that he doesn't treat her well enough.

Bjorlin returned to her role on Days of Our Lives as Chloe for a two-episode stint on August 3, and 4, 2013, to commemorate the 50th anniversary of the daytime serial.

Bjorlin guest starred on 2 Broke Girls as the owner of a cat found by the girls in an episode aired on October 7, 2013.

== Personal life ==
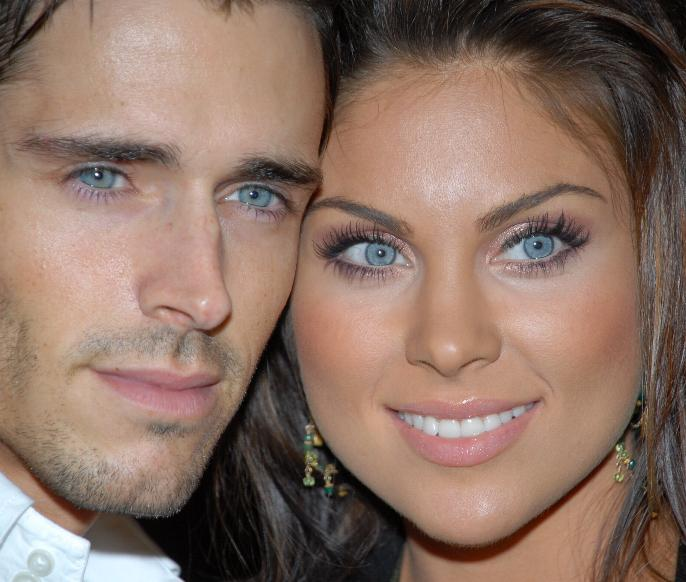
Bjorlin and Brandon Beemer in December 2007

Bjorlin dated Los Angeles radio personality Frank Kramer around 2000 or 2001; Kramer would often refer to her on his show as "Tuesday". She also dated Bruce Willis around 2001–2002. Bjorlin was once engaged to subprime lending tycoon Daniel Sadek, who produced her film Redline. Bjorlin had been in a relationship with her Days of Our Lives co-star Brandon Beemer for seven years until 2013.

Bjorlin became engaged to boyfriend Grant Turnbull, a property developer and home builder, in August 2014. Bjorlin married Turnbull on May 15, 2015, in Palm Springs. The couple have two sons, Torin Mathias, and Viggo Sebastian.

Bjorlin is good friends with her former Days of Our Lives co-star Farah Fath.

Bjorlin's father Ulf Björlin died in 1993 at age 60 due to Leukemia. Since then, Bjorlin has been involved in several charities and fundraisers to help raise awareness and money for research on this type of cancer. She has even formed her own team; Nadia's Cancer Crusaders to help find a cure for this disease. On June 15, 2013, Bjorlin and her then-boyfriend Brandon Beemer participated in and hosted the Leukemia & Lymphoma Society's annual "Light the Night" walk at the Skirball Cultural Center in Los Angeles, California, with the goal of raising $500,000 for Leukemia research and to help people fight the disease. On October 5, 2013, Bjorlin again participated in the "Light the Night" at Sunset Gower Studios in Hollywood.

In 2017, Bjorlin's sister Kamilla, also an actress, was investigated by the U.S. Securities and Exchange Commission for heading up a pump and dump scheme.

Apart from singing and acting, Bjorlin is also a musician and plays the flute, harp, guitar, and piano.

== Filmography ==
Film
Year	Title	Role
2002	The Marriage Undone	Tracie
2007	If I Had Known I Was a Genius	Faith
2007	Redline	Natasha Martin
2008	Jack Rio	Sonia Hunter
2012	Divorce Invitation	Alex Roverson
2020	Alone	Interviewer
2020	Faith Based	Katie
2025	A Murder Between Friends	Kat

Television
Year	Title	Role	Notes
1999–2023	Days of Our Lives	Chloe Lane	Regular role (1999–2003, 2007–11, 2013, 2016–23); Recurring role (2003–05); Guest role (2013, 2015–16, 2020)
2004	Complete Savages	Woman no. 2	Episode: "Almost Men in Uniform"
2005	Jake in Progress	Pretty Woman	Episode: "Sign Language"
2005	Sex, Love & Secrets	Meg	2 episodes
2006	Out of Practice	Alana	Episode: "Model Behavior"
2010	NCIS	Brittany	Episode: "Dead Air"
2010	Two and a Half Men	Jill	Episode: "Springtime on a Stick"
2012	CSI: Crime Scene Investigation	Crystal Hasselbeck	Episode: "Malice in Wonderland"
2013	Anger Management	Dr. Miller	Episode: "Charlie's New Sex Study Partner"
2013	2 Broke Girls	Pam	Episode: "And the Kitty Kitty Spank Spank"
2015	Satisfaction	Amara	Episode: "... Through Travel"
2016	I Know Where Lizzie Is	Tracy	TV film

Web series
Year	Title	Role	Notes
2009–present	Venice: The Series	Lara Miller	Main cast
2019–2020	Days of Our Lives: Last Blast Reunion	Chloe Lane	Main Cast

== Awards and nominations ==
Year	Award	Work	Category	Result
2011	Indie Series Awards	Venice: The Series	Best Supporting Actress-Drama	Nominated
2020	Soap Hub Awards	Days of Our Lives	Favorite Days of Our Lives Actress	Nominated
2021	Soap Hub Awards	Days of Our Lives	Favorite Days of Our Lives Actress	Nominated

== See also ==
- Iranian Americans
