= Sex, Love & Secrets =

American soap opera television series

- Promotional poster
- Genre: Soap opera
- Created by: Michael Gans; Richard Register
- Starring: Denise Richards; Eric Balfour; James Stevenson; Lauren German; Lucas Bryant; Omar Benson Miller; Tamara Taylor; Virginia Hamilton
- Composer: David Schwartz
- Country of origin: United States
- Original language: English
- No. of seasons: 1
- No. of episodes: 10 (6 unaired)

Production
- Production location: Los Angeles
- Camera setup: Multi-camera
- Production companies: The Jonathan Axelrod and Kelly Edwards Company; Paramount Network Television

Original release
- Network: UPN (now The CW)
- Release: September 27 – October 18, 2005

Sex, Love & Secrets is an American soap opera, created by Michael Gans and Richard Register, which originally aired on UPN (now The CW) from September 27 to October 18, 2005. With an ensemble cast led by Denise Richards, James Stevenson, Lauren German, Eric Balfour, Tamara Taylor, Lucas Bryant, and Omar Benson Miller, the series focuses on rich young adults living in Silver Lake, Los Angeles and their secrets involving sex and love. With the prominent use of voice-over narrations, the show took a documentary approach to framing the characters and their storylines. The series was developed as a vehicle and television debut for Richards, and had the working titles Wildlife and Sex, Lies, and Secrets. The episodes were filmed in Los Angeles.

Sex, Love & Secrets was canceled after one season due to low viewership; six of its ten episodes were not aired on UPN. Universal HD broadcast the unaired episodes in 2008. It has not been released on home video or made available on streaming services. Critical response to Sex, Love & Secrets was mixed; some praised it as a guilty pleasure, though others felt the storylines and characters were unoriginal. Critics had mixed reviews for the show's content and style in comparison to other programs, such as Desperate Housewives, Melrose Place, and The O.C..

== Premise ==
Described as a "Generation Y soap opera" by critic John Kenneth Muir, Sex, Love & Secrets revolves around affluent young adults living in Silver Lake, Los Angeles and their secrets regarding love and sex. The Advocate's Richard Andreoli identified the group as "close friends", though the official website states that they act more like a family. One of the show's taglines was "the only thing that can come between them...is the truth". According to The Futon Critic's Brian Ford Sullivan, the show uses "National Geographic-esque footage" to pivot the characters and their storylines as "a study of human behavior" on lying and secrets.

The series has voice-over narrations, and its lines include: "Be it Santa Claus, Twinkies, infidelity or murder, all humans keep secrets." The narrator, voiced by Virginia Hamilton, talks about the characters and their storylines through "clinical terms". McFarland wrote that she speaks in "ominous tones", while other commentators found the voiceover similar to that of a Discovery Channel program. Some critics compared the narrator to Mary Alice Young from Desperate Housewives, while Melanie McFarland of the Seattle Post-Intelligencer likened her to Marty Stouffer's role on Wild America.

== Characters ==
Publicist Jolene (Denise Richards) has a tense relationship with rock musician Hank (James Stevenson), who is planning to marry journalist Rose (Lauren German). As the lead singer of the band Modern Apes, Hank performs "mocking [and] self-congratulatory" versions of Barry Manilow's music. According to Tatiana Morales of CBS News, people compared Jolene to Amanda Woodward from Melrose Place. Muir characterized Jolene as a maneater, and Phil Gallo of Variety viewed her as "a devilish character with a dark soul". On the other hand, Shandy Casteel of PopMatters described Rose as the girl next door. David Bianculli of the New York Daily News cited her as the show's lead character. In the pilot episode, Rose receives the ashes of her ex-boyfriend Billy (Dylan Bruno), but it is revealed he is alive when he re-enters the characters' lives. Jolene believes that Rose had ruined her relationship with Billy, and responds by plotting to take Hank as "a means to nasty retaliation". As part of the show's comedy, Rose imagines people singing pop music to her.

Hair stylist Charlie (Eric Balfour) has sex with Gabrielle (Katie Cassidy), his close friend Coop's (Omar Miller) girlfriend. Charlie looks to Warren Beatty's character from the 1975 film Shampoo as an inspiration for his life. He is portrayed as a "sexual dynamo", though he chooses to maintain a platonic relationship with Meg (Nadia Bjorlin). Meg was a recurring character on the series. The group frequently seeks advice from gynaecologist Nina (Tamara Taylor), characterized as a workaholic without a sex or social life. The hipster Milo (Lucas Bryant) becomes Nina's new roommate after she meets him through an online advertisement. Shandy Casteel wrote that Nina was a "vixen-waiting-to-flower" and felt Milo fulfilled the "creepy-geek-as-potential-killer cliché". The group is typically shown at a bar. Executive producers Michael Gans and Richard Register said that storylines involving LGBT characters were planned.

== Production ==
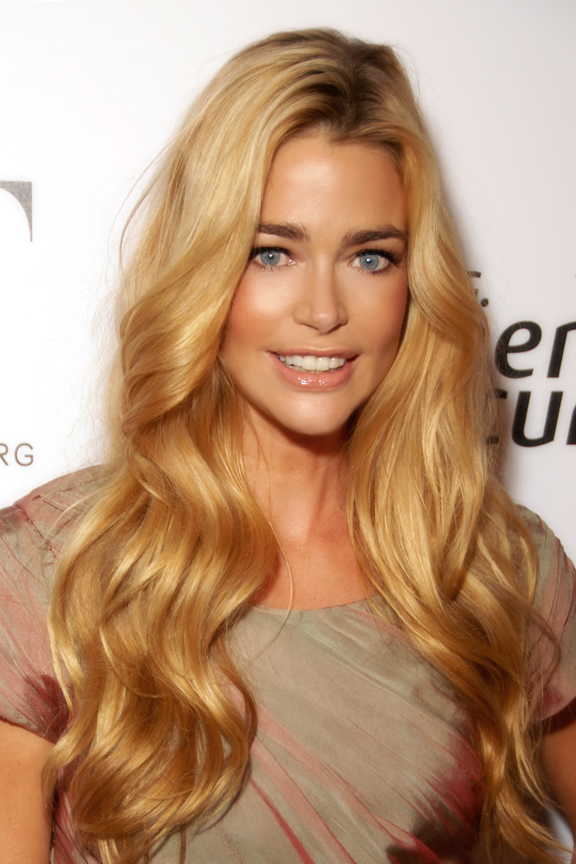
Sex, Love & Secrets was created as a vehicle for Denise Richards' television debut.

Sex, Love & Secrets was first announced as part of a September 7, 2004 press report, and developed under the working titles Wildlife and Sex, Lies, and Secrets. Brian Ford Sullivan wrote that the Wildlife title matched the documentary-style of the series, and Amy Amatangelo of The Gazette felt the Sex, Lies, and Secrets title was changed to avoid confusion with the 1989 film Sex, Lies, and Videotape. When talking about the second title change, executive producer Jonathan Axelrod said: "I've always felt we had more love than lies in the show."

Axelrod/Edwards Company and Paramount Network Television handled production. Jonathan Axelrod, Kelly Edwards, and Daniel Cerone worked as the show's executive producers, while its co-executive producers were Michael Gans and Richard Register. Along with being the series' creators, Gans and Register served as its primary writers. David Schwartz handled the music, and Caty Maxey and Brandy Alexander worked as the production designers. The casting process was overseen by Robin Lippin.

Jolene was Richard's first role in a television series, and Richard Andreoli referred to Sex, Love & Secrets as her star vehicle. Richards was drawn to the character and script, explaining: "It was something I thought was so different and the character was different. It was definitely appealing to be shooting something at home." Richards was pregnant during the filming of the pilot episode. When discussing balancing the filming schedule and motherhood, she said: "My children are my first priority, but it’s nice to have a balance between work and home. This is an ensemble show, so I’m not working every day." Richards considered creating a nursery on the set. Brian Ford Sullivan wrote that Richards plays a smaller role than expected in the show despite her listing as the main actor.

The episodes were shot in Los Angeles; David Straiton, Allison Liddi-Brown, and Rachel Talalay were a few of the primary directors. Shandy Casteel wrote that the series made frequent use of "rapid camera zooms, faded-out flashbacks, and quick cuts" and other types of "production flourishes". Phil Gallo described the direction as having "an intimate and racy feel" focused on colorful settings.

== Episodes ==
No.	Title	Directed by	Written by	Original release date	US viewers (millions)
1	"Secrets"	David Straiton	Michael Gans & Richard Register	September 27, 2005	1.4
2	"Ambush"	David Straiton	Michael Gans & Richard Register	October 4, 2005	0.912
3	"Danger"	Allison Liddi-Brown	Daniel Cerone	October 11, 2005	N/A
4	"Molting"	Michael Fields	Alysa Sun & Elle Triedman	October 18, 2005	N/A
5	"Territorial Defense"	Bethany Rooney	Jennifer Cecil	Unaired	N/A
6	"Fear"	Michael Fields	Michael Gans & Richard Register	Unaired	N/A
7	"Abandonment"	Nick Marck	Michael Platt, Barry Safchik	Unaired	N/A
8	"Protection"	Rachel Talalay	Jessica Ball	Unaired	N/A
9	"Camouflage"	Rachel Talalay	Jessica Ball	Unaired	N/A
10	"Symbiosis"	Rachel Talalay	Jessica Ball	Unaired	N/A

== Broadcast history ==
Sex, Love & Secrets was broadcast initially on Tuesday nights at 9 pm EST on United Paramount Network (UPN). The episodes aired between September 27, 2005, and October 18, 2005. It was one of three new shows the network ordered for the 2005–06 season. The show's official website hosted preview videos and an interactive map of the Silver Lake community. Muir wrote that UPN intended to market the series to fans of Beverly Hills, 90210 and Melrose Place. Melanie McFarland considered Sex, Love & Secrets part of the network's plans to add more prime-time soap operas to its scheduling. The pilot received "mixed reviews and weak viewership", having been watched by an average of 1.4 million people.

Due to its poor reception and ratings, UPN canceled Sex, Love & Secrets after one episode aired. It had the lowest rating of any network television show that aired in the 2005–06 season. The network clarified that it would broadcast the remaining episodes that had been filmed, and might renew the show if ratings improved. UPN did not air six of the eight episodes. It has never been released on DVD or Blu-ray, or on any online-streaming service. The series was the second-lowest rated network television of the season, above only Get This Party Started. According to Muir, it fared poorly in every demographic. When talking about the cancellation, Balfour joked: "I LIKE doing shows that fail." Gary Susman and Michael Slezak of Entertainment Weekly wrote that the removal of Sex, Love & Secrets cut short Richards' television career.

In 2008, Universal HD acquired the series, airing it alongside fellow UPN series South Beach in a "Sexy Summer Sundays" block. The run included premieres of the six episodes that had not been aired by UPN.

== Critical reception ==
Based on 16 reviews, Sex, Love & Secrets received a score from Metacritic of 41/100, indicating "mixed or average reviews". Phil Gallo praised the show as having "the potential to be a real guilty pleasure", and cited Jolene as its highlight. Gallo described Richards as conveying "the most dramatic presence" in the scenes, and wrote: "without her, the show would wither". Rob Owen also commended the series as "a little sleazy and a heck of a lot of guilty pleasure fun". A contributor for Zimbio responded positively to Lauren German's performance, saying she "hit her stride by landing the lead role" in shows such as Sex, Love & Secrets. Brian Ford Sullivan praised Richard's performance as the only positive aspect of the series as she brings out its campy qualities. Reviewing the series, Doug Elfman of the Chicago Sun-Times wrote: "It's skank-errific, if flawed." Despite being critical of Sex, Love & Secrets, Aaron Barnhart of The Kansas City Star felt that it was not the worst example of a prime-time soap opera.

Sex, Love & Secrets also garnered negative reactions from television critics. Shandy Casteel panned the series, writing that it relied on "stock characters in stock situations". Anita Gates criticized the narration as "vapid commentary [that] sets the tone for this vapid soap about vapid young single heterosexual friends". Matthew Gilbert of The Boston Globe wrote that the characters acted out "every negative stereotype about LA". USA Today's Robert Bianco did not believe that Richards and Balfour's performances could carry the series. Tim Goodman of the San Francisco Chronicle summarized the pilot episode saying: "It's awful. Vote no." A reviewer from Out criticized the show's tone, and wrote it was "too much mellow and not enough drama".

Critics had mixed reviews for Sex, Love & Secrets, when compared to other television programs. Rob Owen identified it as a good replacement for Melrose Place fans, while Casteel described the series as an unsuccessful attempt to recreate it. Matthew Gilbert felt that its serious tone clashed with its intentions to become a guilty pleasure in the same vein as Melrose Place. Instead, The Wall Street Journal's Nancy DeWolf Smith likened the show's storylines and tone to Desperate Housewives. Robert Bianco interpreted Sex, Love & Secrets as a shallow version of The O.C.. Kay McFadden of The Seattle Times wrote that the show lacked "the self-aware wit" of The O.C. and the "over-the-top fun" of Melrose Place.
